= List of African Union member states by political system =

African Union (AU) member states have various forms of government. The Constitutive Act of the African Union makes no provision for what type of government a member state may or must have, but Article 30 states:

Governments which shall come to power through unconstitutional means shall not be allowed to participate in the activities of the Union.

This clause has only been applied to Mauritania after its 2005 coup d'état, to Madagascar as a result of the 2009 Malagasy political crisis and to Togo during its political crisis in April 2005.

Several political systems of governance are represented in the AU, including stable, competitive democracies (Botswana, Cape Verde), systems dominated by single parties, and even a failed state that exists in a de jure capacity (Somalia) and a government in exile (Western Sahara's Sahrawi Arab Democratic Republic.)

== Monarchism and republicanism ==
monarchy republic

At present, three sovereign monarchies are members of the African Union: Eswatini (ruled by King Mswati III, with Ntombi), Lesotho (ruled by King Letsie III), and Morocco (ruled by King Mohammed VI of Morocco). Lesotho is a constitutional monarchy, in which the king or queen serves a largely ceremonial function; he no longer possesses any executive authority and is proscribed from actively participating in political initiatives. According to the constitution, the leader of the majority party in the assembly automatically becomes prime minister; the monarch is hereditary, but, under the terms of the constitution which came into effect after the March 1993 election, the monarch is a "living symbol of national unity" with no executive or legislative powers; under traditional law the college of chiefs has the power to determine who is next in the line of succession, who shall serve as regent in the event that the successor is not of mature age, and may even depose the monarch. Eswatini (Swaziland) is an absolute monarchy, currently in the process of democratization. According to current Swazi law and custom, the monarch holds supreme executive, legislative, and judicial powers. The king ("Ngwenyama") is a hereditary leader, receiving assistance from a council of ministers and a national legislature. The senior queen ("Ndlovukati") is in charge of national rituals, and acts as regent if her counterpart Ngwenyama dies and the heir has not performed royal adulthood rituals or is indisposed. If the king's mother is no longer living, one of the king's wives may act as Ndlovukati. The king has constitutional protection from arrest and trial.

In several other African states there are subnational monarchs, but only a select few are vested with constitutional and\or legal powers, and therefore the majority of them are little more than traditional notables in practice. The Ashanti Confederacy in Ghana is led by Asantehene (King) Otumfuo Nana Osei Tutu II; the succession is decided by a series of councils of local nobles and other royal family members. KwaZulu-Natal (or Zululand) is led by the king of the Zulu Nation, currently Misuzulu Zulu. Although he does not hold any direct political power, he is provided a stipend by the government of South Africa, and holds considerable sway over more traditionalist Zulu people in the KwaZulu-Natal Province. Both the Asantehene and the Zulu monarch are part of complex networks of other kings and chiefs that constitutionally serve as traditional leaders of their respective countries.

Due to constitutional reform in Uganda in 1993, several traditional monarchies have been politically reconstituted by the government of Yoweri Museveni. These are:

- Ankole: Omugabe Ntare VI
- Buganda: Kabaka Muwenda Mutebi II and Nnabagereka Sylvia
- Bunyoro: Omukama Iguru
- Busoga: Kyabazinga Henry Wako Muloki
- Toro: Omukama Rukidi IV

Elsewhere, in Botswana, the kgosis (or chieftains) of the various tribes are constitutionally empowered to serve as advisors within the national legislature as members of the Ntlo ya Dikgosi. Meanwhile, in Nigeria, the various traditional polities that currently exist are politically defined by way of the ceding of definite authority from the provincial governments, which in turn receive their powers to do so from a series of chieftaincy laws that have been legislatively created. Beyond this, residual powers are also derived by the Nigerian traditional rulers from both pre-existing customary laws and the remnants of the indirect rule policy of the colonial era.

Historically, there have been several monarchies throughout the African continent. Since decolonization, many have been abolished in favor of republics. The following African monarchies have existed in the twentieth century:

- Kingdom of Burundi (abolished 1966)
- Central African Empire (abolished 1979)
- Congo Free State (annexed by Belgium, 1908)
- Kingdom of Egypt (abolished 1953)
- Empire of Ethiopia (abolished 1975)
- Kingdom of Libya (abolished 1969)
- Kingdom of Rwanda (abolished 1961)
- Kingdom of Tunisia (abolished 1957)
- Sultanate of Zanzibar (abolished 1964, currently a constituent of the United Republic of Tanzania)

Several African colonies were under the sovereignty of the King or Queen of the United Kingdom. Upon independence, several states became Dominions or Commonwealth realms, sharing their head of state with the United Kingdom. All have subsequently abolished the monarchy:

- The Gambia (abolished 1970)
- Ghana (abolished 1960)
- Kenya (abolished 1964)
- Malawi (abolished 1966)
- Mauritius (abolished 1992)
- Nigeria (abolished 1963)
- Rhodesia (not recognized; abolished 1970)
- Sierra Leone (abolished 1971)
- Union of South Africa (abolished 1961)
- Tanganyika (abolished 1962)
- Uganda (abolished 1963)

In spite of this, several African states are affiliated with the Commonwealth of Nations:

- Botswana
- Cameroon
- Eswatini (Swaziland)
- The Gambia
- Ghana
- Kenya
- Lesotho
- Malawi
- Mauritius
- Mozambique
- Namibia
- Nigeria
- Seychelles
- Sierra Leone
- South Africa
- Tanzania
- Uganda
- Zambia

== Form of government ==
presidential republics, full presidential system presidential republics, executive presidency linked to a parliament presidential republics, semi-presidential system parliamentary republics parliamentary constitutional monarchies in which the monarch does not personally exercise power absolute monarchies One-party states non-AU state Somalia and the Sahrawi Arab Democratic Republic are colored according to their de jure form of government. The former is a failed state, the latter is mostly under military occupation by Morocco, although the SADR does administer some territory.

non-electoral democracy electoral democracy non-AU state Freedom House index of electoral democracies in AU member states, from Freedom in the World 2006.

6–6.9 5–5.9 4–4.9 3–3.9 2–2.9 1–1.9 not ranked non-AU state The Corruption Perceptions Index is published by Transparency International and provides data on perceived corruption. Every African state has a problem with corruption according to this survey.

There are several types of government systems in African politics:

- in an absolute monarchy, the head of state and head of government is a monarch with unlimited legal authority,
- in a constitutional monarchy, the monarch is a ceremonial figurehead who has few political competences,
- in a presidential system, the president is the head of state and head of government,
- in a semi-presidential system, the president and the prime minister share a number of competences,
- in a parliamentary system, the president is a ceremonial figurehead who has few political competences
- in a one-party state, there may be theoretical or legal protection for opposition parties, but there is no legitimate chance of a candidate outside the ruling party winning an election; often there are constitutional provisions protecting one-party dominance. While no AU state is constitutionally defined as such, the following are effectively one-party states:
  - Eritrea (People's Front for Democracy and Justice)
  - Western Sahara's (Polisario Front)

Even in other states with elections, actual opposition may not exist. The following have been or are considered dominant-party systems:
- Angola (Popular Movement for the Liberation of Angola - Party of Labour)
- Botswana (Botswana Democratic Party)
- Cameroon (Cameroon People's Democratic Movement)
- Chad (Patriotic Salvation Movement)
- Republic of the Congo (Congolese Labour Party)
- Djibouti (People's Rally for Progress)
- Equatorial Guinea (Democratic Party of Equatorial Guinea)
- Ethiopia (Ethiopian People's Revolutionary Democratic Front)
- Gabon (Gabonese Democratic Party)
- The Gambia (Alliance for Patriotic Reorientation and Construction)
- Mozambique (Mozambican Liberation Front)
- Namibia (South-West Africa People's Organisation)
- Rwanda (Rwandese Patriotic Front)
- Seychelles (Seychelles People's Progressive Front)
- South Africa (African National Congress)
- Sudan (National Congress Party)
- Tanzania (Chama Cha Mapinduzi)
- Zimbabwe (Zimbabwe African National Union – Patriotic Front)

- in a military dictatorship, high-ranking military officials run the state with authoritarian rule.

The politics of Africa have been blighted by severe problems with corruption and nepotism, coups d'état, and civil war. Corruption is a severe problem in much of the continent, with the vast majority of African states ranking below a five out of ten in Transparency International's Corruption Perceptions Index. Five of the ten most corrupt governments are AU member states:

151. Angola (2.0)
152. Côte d'Ivoire (1.9)
152. Equatorial Guinea (1.9)
152. Nigeria (1.9)
158. Chad (1.7)

The following AU states are in ongoing wars, or have recently ceased hostilities:

- Côte d'Ivoire: Ivorian Civil War, 2002–2011
- Democratic Republic of the Congo: Ituri Conflict, since 1999, Second Congo War, 1998–2002
- Senegal: Casamance Conflict, since 1988
- Somalia: Somali Civil War, since 1991 certain regions are controlled by different warlords; autonomous internal states emerged (Jubaland, Puntland, Southwestern Somalia, Galmudug); Somaliland declared independence in 1991 but is not internationally recognized; since 2004, there is a new transitional parliamentary republican government.
- Sudan: Chadian-Sudanese conflict, 2005–2006, part of the larger Darfur conflict in Darfur, Second Sudanese Civil War, 1983–2005, in Southern Sudan
- Western Sahara: 2020-present Western Saharan clashes, a continuation of the Western Sahara conflict against Morocco's military occupation.
- Libya: 2011 Libyan civil war and Second Libyan Civil War (2014–2020)
- Mali: Northern Mali conflict, 2012–2015
- Central African Republic: Central African Republic Bush War, 2004–2007 and Central African Republic conflict (2012–present)

== Degree of self-governance ==
Forty-five of the African Union's member states are unitary states, which means that most of the competences lie with the central government and only minor or local issues are within the authority of regional governments. However, four states are federations (Comoros, Ethiopia, Nigeria, and Sudan) of states or regions with equal competences, Somalia's Transitional Federal Parliament is also a federation; Madagascar has devolved certain powers to its six provinces; and the United Republic of Tanzania is a federacy of Tanganyika and Zanzibar, the latter of which elects its own president for internal affairs. Former federations and confederations in Africa from the twentieth century include:

- French West Africa (1904–1958)
- French Equatorial Africa (1910–1960)
- Federation of Rhodesia and Nyasaland (1953–1963)
- Mali Federation (1959–1960)
- Federal Republic of Cameroon (1961–1972)
- Uganda (1962–1967)
- Sénégambia Confederation (1982–1989)

== Legislatures ==
A further distinction is the number of chambers in the national legislature; either with one or two houses. There is no clear trend towards either model as of 2006, and there's also no real common factor which determines whether a country's legislature is unicameral or bicameral, except for the fact that federations and countries with strong regional differences or regional identities are normally bicameral to reflect the regions' interests in national bills.

The function and form of the houses vary widely; some are directly elected, others indirectly or appointed, some have legal provisions for minority representation, based either on ethnicity, religious affiliation, or gender. In Cameroon and Malawi, there are legally two houses, but only one is functional.

There are presently 34 unicameral legislatures and 19 bicameral legislatures in among AU member states.

== Listed by form of government ==
State	Government	Head of state	Head of government
Algeria	semi-presidential unitary republic	President of Algeria	Prime Minister of Algeria
Angola	presidential unitary republic	President of Angola	
Benin	presidential unitary republic	President of Benin	
Botswana	parliamentary unitary republic	President of Botswana	
Burkina Faso	presidential unitary republic	President of Burkina Faso	Prime Minister of Burkina Faso
Burundi	presidential unitary republic	President of Burundi	
Cameroon	presidential unitary republic	President of Cameroon	
Cape Verde	parliamentary unitary republic	President of Cape Verde	Prime Minister of Cape Verde
Central African Republic	presidential unitary republic	President of the Central African Republic	Prime Minister of the Central African Republic
Chad	presidential unitary republic	President of Chad	Prime Minister of Chad
Comoros	presidential federal republic	President of Comoros	
Democratic Republic of the Congo	semi-presidential unitary republic	President of the Democratic Republic of the Congo	Prime Minister of the Democratic Republic of the Congo
Republic of the Congo	presidential unitary republic	President of the Republic of the Congo	
Ivory Coast	presidential unitary republic	President of Ivory Coast	Prime Minister of Ivory Coast
Djibouti	presidential unitary republic	President of Djibouti	Prime Minister of Djibouti
Egypt	semi-presidential unitary republic	President of Egypt	Prime Minister of Egypt
Equatorial Guinea	presidential unitary republic	President of Equatorial Guinea	Prime Minister of Equatorial Guinea
Eritrea	presidential unitary republic	President of Eritrea	
Eswatini (Swaziland)	unitary absolute monarchy	King of Swaziland	
Ethiopia	semi-presidential federal republic	President of Ethiopia	Prime Minister of Ethiopia
Gabon	presidential unitary republic	President of Gabon	Prime Minister of Gabon
Gambia	presidential unitary republic	President of the Gambia	
Ghana	presidential unitary republic	President of Ghana	
Guinea	presidential unitary republic	President of Guinea	Prime Minister of Guinea
Guinea-Bissau	semi-presidential unitary republic	President of Guinea-Bissau	Prime Minister of Guinea-Bissau
Kenya	presidential unitary republic	President of Kenya	
Lesotho	parliamentary unitary constitutional monarchy	King of Lesotho	Prime Minister of Lesotho
Liberia	presidential unitary republic	President of Liberia	
Libya	parliamentary republic	President of the House of Representatives	Prime Minister of Libya
Madagascar	semi-presidential devolved republic	President of Madagascar	Prime Minister of Madagascar
Malawi	presidential unitary republic	President of Malawi	
Mali	presidential unitary republic	President of Mali	Prime Minister of Mali
Mauritania	semi-presidential republic	President of Mauritania	Prime Minister of Mauritania
Mauritius	semi-presidential unitary republic	President of Mauritius	Prime Minister of Mauritius
Morocco	parliamentary unitary constitutional monarchy	King of Morocco	Prime Minister of Morocco
Mozambique	presidential unitary republic	President of Mozambique	Prime Minister of Mozambique
Namibia	presidential unitary republic	President of Namibia	Prime Minister of Namibia
Niger	semi-presidential unitary republic	President of Niger	Prime Minister of Niger
Nigeria	presidential unitary federation	President of Nigeria	
Rwanda	presidential unitary republic	President of Rwanda	Prime Minister of Rwanda
São Tomé and Príncipe	semi-presidential unitary republic	President of São Tomé and Príncipe	Prime Minister of São Tomé and Príncipe
Senegal	presidential unitary republic	President of Senegal	Prime Minister of Senegal
Seychelles	presidential unitary republic	President of Seychelles	
Sierra Leone	presidential unitary republic	President of Sierra Leone	
Somalia	semi-presidential federal republic	President of Somalia	Prime Minister of Somalia
South Africa	semi-presidential unitary republic	President of South Africa	
South Sudan	presidential federal republic	President of South Sudan	
Sudan	presidential federal republic	President of Sudan	
Tanzania	presidential federacy republic	President of Tanzania	Prime Minister of Tanzania
Togo	presidential unitary republic	President of Togo	Prime Minister of Togo
Tunisia	presidential unitary republic	President of Tunisia	Prime Minister of Tunisia
Uganda	presidential unitary republic	President of Uganda	Prime Minister of Uganda
Sahrawi Republic	semi-presidential unitary republic	President of the Sahrawi Arab Democratic Republic	Prime Minister of the Sahrawi Arab Democratic Republic
Zambia	presidential unitary republic	President of Zambia	
Zimbabwe	presidential unitary republic	President of Zimbabwe	

== Listed by type of legislature ==
State	Unicameral/ bicameral	Overall name of legislature		Method of election
State	Unicameral/ bicameral	Lower house (members)	Upper house (members)	Method of election
Algeria	bicameral	Parliament		Members of the People's National Assembly are directly elected every five years. The Council of the Nation has two-thirds of its members elected by regional and municipal authorities; one-third are appointed by the president to six-year terms with one-half of the seats up for election or reappointment every 3 years.
Algeria	bicameral	People's National Assembly (380)	Council of the Nation (144)	Members of the People's National Assembly are directly elected every five years. The Council of the Nation has two-thirds of its members elected by regional and municipal authorities; one-third are appointed by the president to six-year terms with one-half of the seats up for election or reappointment every 3 years.
Angola	unicameral	National Assembly (Assembleia Nacional) (220)		Members are elected for a four-year term, 130 by proportional representation and 90 in provincial districts.
Benin	unicameral	National Assembly (83)		Members are elected every four years by party-list proportional representation.
Botswana	bicameral	Parliament		Members of the National Assembly are elected to five-year terms by plurality vote for 57 members, four posts are co-opted, and two are ex officio (the president and attorney-general.) The Ntlo ya Dikgosi represent the eight principal subgroups of the Batswana people represented by one member, with hereditary membership; four members are appointed by sub-chiefs in the districts of North-East, Ghanzi, Kgalagadi, and North-West; three members are elected by the aforementioned twelve.
Botswana	bicameral	Ntlo ya Dikgosi (15)	National Assembly (63)	Members of the National Assembly are elected to five-year terms by plurality vote for 57 members, four posts are co-opted, and two are ex officio (the president and attorney-general.) The Ntlo ya Dikgosi represent the eight principal subgroups of the Batswana people represented by one member, with hereditary membership; four members are appointed by sub-chiefs in the districts of North-East, Ghanzi, Kgalagadi, and North-West; three members are elected by the aforementioned twelve.
Burkina Faso	unicameral	National Assembly (Assemblée Nationale) (111)		Members are elected to five-year terms by proportional representation, 21 from one national constituency and 90 from 13 regional constituencies, with two to 10 per region, using the party-list proportional representation system.
Burundi	bicameral	Parliament		Members of the National Assembly are elected for five-year terms in 17 multi-member constituencies by the D'Hondt method of proportional representation with a 2% barrier; 100 are directly elected and between 18 and 21 are co-opted. Constitutionally, 60% of members be from the Hutu ethnic group, while the remaining 40% come from the Tutsi ethnic group. Members of the Senate are elected for five-year terms by electoral colleges of communal councilors. Two senators, one Hutu and one Tutsi, are chosen by electoral colleges of communal councilors in each of the country's 17 provinces. Voting takes place using a three-round system. In the first two rounds, a candidate must receive a super-majority (two-thirds, or 67% of the vote) to be elected. If no candidate is elected in these rounds, a third round is organized for the two leading candidates, of which the candidate receiving the majority of votes is elected. Former heads of state automatically become senators. In both houses, three co-opted members represent the Twa ethnic group and women must occupy at least 30% of the seats; extra seats can be added to ensure that ethnic and gender quotas are met.
Burundi	bicameral	National Assembly (Assemblée nationale) (118–121)	Senate (Sénat) (37–54)	
Cameroon	bicameral	N/A		Members of the National Assembly are elected for five-year terms in 49 single- and multi-seat constituencies. The Constitution of Cameroon established of a 100-member senate as part of a bicameral legislature, with one-third of senators to be appointed by the President of Cameroon, and the remaining two-thirds to be chosen by indirect election. The government has yet to establish the Senate.
Cameroon	bicameral	National Assembly (Assemblée Nationale) (180)	Senate (Sénat) (100)	Members of the National Assembly are elected for five-year terms in 49 single- and multi-seat constituencies. The Constitution of Cameroon established of a 100-member senate as part of a bicameral legislature, with one-third of senators to be appointed by the President of Cameroon, and the remaining two-thirds to be chosen by indirect election. The government has yet to establish the Senate.
Cape Verde	unicameral	National Assembly (Asembleia Nacional) (72)		Members are elected to five-year terms by proportional representation, in 16 multi-member constituencies by the D'Hondt method of proportional representation.
Central African Republic	unicameral	National Assembly (Assemblée Nationale) (105)		Members are elected for a five-year term using two-round run-off voting.
Chad	unicameral	National Assembly (155)		Members are elected by for four-year terms in 25 single-member constituencies and 34 multi-member constituencies.
Comoros	unicameral	Assembly of the Union of the Comoros (33)		Members are elected to five-year terms; 18 directly in single member constituencies using two-round run-off voting, 15 from local assemblies on each of the three islands of Anjouan, Mohéli, and Grande Comore.
Democratic Republic of the Congo	bicameral	Parliament		Members of the National Assembly are elected by direct suffrage, senators are elected by the legislatures of the 26 provinces.
Democratic Republic of the Congo	bicameral	National Assembly (500)	Senate (120)	Members of the National Assembly are elected by direct suffrage, senators are elected by the legislatures of the 26 provinces.
Republic of the Congo	bicameral	Parliament Parlement		Members of the National Assembly are elected to five-year terms in single-seat constituencies. Members of the Senate are elected to six-year terms by the district, local, and regional councils.
Republic of the Congo	bicameral	National Assembly Assemblée Nationale (153)	Senate Sénat (66)	Members of the National Assembly are elected to five-year terms in single-seat constituencies. Members of the Senate are elected to six-year terms by the district, local, and regional councils.
Ivory Coast	unicameral	National Assembly Assemblée Nationale (225)		Members are elected for five-year terms in single-seat constituencies.
Djibouti	unicameral	National Assembly Assemblée Nationale (65)		Members are elected to five-year terms in multi-seat constituencies (between four and 37 each); legally, 33 are Issa and 32 are Afar.
Egypt	unicameral	House of Representatives مجلس النواب Maglis Al-Nowwab (450)		The House sits for a five-year term but can be dissolved earlier by the president. All seats are voted on in each election. The House of Representatives members are elected by absolute majority of legitimate votes cast.
Equatorial Guinea	unicameral	Chamber of People's Representatives (Cámara de Representantes del Pueblo)(100)		Members are elected for five-year terms by party-list proportional representation in multi-member constituencies.
Eritrea	unicameral	National Assembly (Hagerawi Baito)		The National Assembly has 104 members; 60 appointed and 44 representing the members of the Central Committee of the People's Front for Democracy and Justice.
Ethiopia	bicameral	Federal Parliamentary Assembly (Zgromadzenie Narodowe)		Members of the House of Peoples' Representatives are elected to five-year terms in single-seat constituencies; 22 of these seats are reserved for minority nationalities and peoples. Members of the House of Federation are elected by State Councils that may either have direct elections or chose their member of the House. Constitutionally, "[E]ach Nation, Nationality and People shall be represented in the House of the Federation by at least one member. Each Nation or Nationality shall be represented by one additional representative for each one million of its population."
Ethiopia	bicameral	House of Peoples' Representatives (የሕዝብ ተወካዮች ምክር ቤት (Yehizbtewekayoch Mekir Bet))(547)	House of Federation (የፌዴሬሽን ምክር ቤት (Yefedereshn Mekir Bet))(112)	
Gabon	bicameral	Parliament (Parlement)		Members of the National Assembly are elected for five-year terms in single-seat constituencies, with nine members appointed by the President of Gabon. Members of the Senate are elected for six-year terms in single-seat constituencies by local and departmental councillors.
Gabon	bicameral	National Assembly (Assemblée Nationale) (120)	Senate (Sénat)(91)	Members of the National Assembly are elected for five-year terms in single-seat constituencies, with nine members appointed by the President of Gabon. Members of the Senate are elected for six-year terms in single-seat constituencies by local and departmental councillors.
Gambia	unicameral	National Assembly (53)		Members are elected to five-year terms in single-member constituencies with plurality voting; 48 are directly elected while the remaining five are appointed by the President of the Gambia.
Ghana	unicameral	Parliament (231)		Members are elected to four-year terms – except in times of war, when their mandate can extend to five years – from single-seat constituencies by simple majority vote.
Guinea	unicameral	National Assembly (Assemblée Nationale)(114)		Members are elected to five-year terms, 38 in single-seat constituencies with plurality voting, and 76 by proportional representation using national party-lists.
Guinea-Bissau	unicameral	National People's Assembly (Assembleia Nacional Popular)(102)		Members are elected for five-year terms in multi-member constituencies, with 100 members elected through a system of party-list proportional representation and two seats reserved for Guinea-Bissau citizens living overseas, but they were not filled in the most recent election.
Kenya	unicameral	National Assembly or Bunge (224)		Members are elected for five-year terms; 210 in single-seat constituencies, 12 nominated by political parties on a proportional representation basis, and 2 ex officio appointments, the Attorney-General and the Speaker.
Lesotho	bicameral	Parliament		Members of the National Assembly are elected for five-year terms; 80 in single-seat constituencies, with plurality voting, 40 through proportional representation and national party-lists. In the Senate, 22 members are hereditary principal chiefs and 11 are nominated by the King of Lesotho, all for five-year terms.
Lesotho	bicameral	National Assembly (120)	Senate (33)	Members of the National Assembly are elected for five-year terms; 80 in single-seat constituencies, with plurality voting, 40 through proportional representation and national party-lists. In the Senate, 22 members are hereditary principal chiefs and 11 are nominated by the King of Lesotho, all for five-year terms.
Liberia	bicameral	Legislature		Members of the House are elected for six-year terms in single-seat constituencies distributed among Liberia's fifteen counties based on its total number of registered voters. Each county is guaranteed by law to have at least two seats. Members of the Senate ar elected for nine-year terms in single-seat constituencies with two senators for each of Liberia's counties.
Liberia	bicameral	House of Representatives (64)	Senate (30)	Members of the House are elected for six-year terms in single-seat constituencies distributed among Liberia's fifteen counties based on its total number of registered voters. Each county is guaranteed by law to have at least two seats. Members of the Senate ar elected for nine-year terms in single-seat constituencies with two senators for each of Liberia's counties.
Libya	unicameral	House of Representatives (200)		Members of the House of Representatives are elected in a parallel voting; 40 seats through first-past-the-post in single-member constituencies, 80 seats through single non-transferable vote in 29 multi-member constituencies, and 80 seats through proportional representation
Madagascar	bicameral	Parliament		Members of the National Assembly are elected to four-year terms in a mix of single- and two-member constituencies. Members of the Senate are elected to six-year terms, with 10 members for each province chosen by provincial electors and 30 members are appointed.
Madagascar	bicameral	National Assembly (Antenimieram-Pirenena/Assemblée Nationale)(160)	Senate (Sénat)(90)	Members of the National Assembly are elected to four-year terms in a mix of single- and two-member constituencies. Members of the Senate are elected to six-year terms, with 10 members for each province chosen by provincial electors and 30 members are appointed.
Malawi	bicameral	N/A		Members of the National Assembly are elected for five-year terms in single- and multiple-seat constituencies; 147 are directly elected with two-round run-off votes, the other 13 represent the Malawian community abroad on a separate ticket. The Constitution of Malawi established of an 80-member senate as part of a bicameral legislature, with representation for traditional leaders and the different geographical districts, as well as various special interest groups, such as women, youth, and the disabled. The government has yet to establish the Senate.
Malawi	bicameral	National Assembly (194)	Senate (80)	
Mali	unicameral	National Assembly (Assemblée Nationale)(160)		Members are elected to five-year terms, 147 members elected in single-seat constituencies with party-list proportional representation and 13 members elected by Malians abroad.
Mauritania	bicameral	Parliament (Barlamane/Parlement)		Members of the National Assembly are elected to five-year terms in single-seat constituencies. Members of the Senate are elected to six-year terms by municipal councillors with one-third renewed every two years and three members elected by Mauritanians abroad.
Mauritania	bicameral	National Assembly (Al Jamiya al-Wataniyah/Assemblée Nationale) (81)	Senate (Majlis al-Shuyukh/Sénat) (56)	Members of the National Assembly are elected to five-year terms in single-seat constituencies. Members of the Senate are elected to six-year terms by municipal councillors with one-third renewed every two years and three members elected by Mauritanians abroad.
Mauritius	unicameral	National Assembly (70)		Members are elected for four-year terms in single-seat constituencies; 62 are directly elected eight are appointed by the Supreme Court to ensure that ethnic and religious minorities are equitably represented.
Morocco	bicameral	Parliament		The House of Representatives or the lower house. 395 members elected directly for a five-year term. The House of Councillors is elected indirectly for a six-year term by two sets of electoral colleges.
Morocco	bicameral	House of Representatives (395)	House of Councillors (270)	The House of Representatives or the lower house. 395 members elected directly for a five-year term. The House of Councillors is elected indirectly for a six-year term by two sets of electoral colleges.
Mozambique	unicameral	Assembly of the Republic (Assembleia da República)(250)		Members are elected to five-year terms by proportional representation, with a 5% barrier.
Namibia	bicameral	Parliament		Members of the National Assembly are elected to five-year terms, 72 by proportional representation, and six appointed by the President of Namibia. Members of the National Council are elected to six-year terms in double-seat constituencies (regions).
Namibia	bicameral	National Assembly (78)	National Council (26)	Members of the National Assembly are elected to five-year terms, 72 by proportional representation, and six appointed by the President of Namibia. Members of the National Council are elected to six-year terms in double-seat constituencies (regions).
Niger	unicameral	National Assembly (Assemblée Nationale)(113)		Members are elected for five-year terms by party-list proportional representation, with a 5% barrier; 105 elected in multi-seat constituencies and eight in single-seat national minority constituencies.
Nigeria	bicameral	National Assembly		Members of the House of Representatives are elected to four-year terms in single-member constituencies using the simple majority system. Members of the Senate are elected to four-year terms in three-member constituencies (one for each of Nigeria's states), except the federal district of Abuja, which has one representative. The House was created to provide proportional representation based on population in Nigeria's states; the Senate represents the states themselves.
Nigeria	bicameral	House of Representatives (360)	Senate (109)	Members of the House of Representatives are elected to four-year terms in single-member constituencies using the simple majority system. Members of the Senate are elected to four-year terms in three-member constituencies (one for each of Nigeria's states), except the federal district of Abuja, which has one representative. The House was created to provide proportional representation based on population in Nigeria's states; the Senate represents the states themselves.
Rwanda	bicameral	Parliament (Inteko Ishinga Amategeko/Parlement)		Members of the Chamber of Deputies are elected to five-year terms; 53 in direct elections by proportional representation, with a 5% barrier, 24 female members are elected by provincial councils, two are appointed by the National Youth Council, and one by the Federation of the Associations of the Disabled. Members of the Senate are elected or appointed for eight-year terms; 12 are elected by provincial and sectoral councils; eight are appointed by the President of Rwanda to ensure the representation of historically marginalized communities, four are appointed by the Forum of Political Formations, and two are elected by the staff of the universities. Additionally, former presidents can request to be members of the Senate.
Rwanda	bicameral	Chamber of Deputies (Umutwe w'Abadepite/Chambre des Députés) (80)	Senate (Umutwe wa Sena/Sénat) (26)	
São Tomé and Príncipe	unicameral	National Assembly (Assembleia Nacional)(55)		Members are elected for four-year terms in seven multi-member constituencies by party-list proportional representation.
Senegal	unicameral	National Assembly (Assemblée Nationale)(120)		Members are elected to five-year terms in multi-seat constituencies.
Seychelles	unicameral	National Assembly (Assemblée Nationale)(34)		Members are elected to five-year terms; 25 in single-member constituencies with plurality voting; nine through a system of proportional representation.
Sierra Leone	unicameral	Parliament or House of Representatives (124)		Members are elected to five-year terms; 112 through proportional representation in 14 multi-seat constituencies with a constituency threshold of 12.5%, and 12 are paramount chiefs who are indirectly elected.
Somalia	unicameral	Transitional Federal Parliament (275)		Somalia has not had a functioning government since the beginning of the Somali Civil War in 1991. Members of the parliament were divided between Somalia's four major clans, with 61 seats each, while an alliance of minority clans was awarded 31 seats.
South Africa	bicameral	Parliament		Members of the National Assembly are elected to five-year terms through proportional representation, half of whom are chosen from nationwide party lists, the other from party lists for each province. Members of the National Council of Provinces are appointed in groups of ten by provincial legislatures for five-year terms.
South Africa	bicameral	National Assembly (400)	National Council of Provinces (90)	Members of the National Assembly are elected to five-year terms through proportional representation, half of whom are chosen from nationwide party lists, the other from party lists for each province. Members of the National Council of Provinces are appointed in groups of ten by provincial legislatures for five-year terms.
South Sudan	bicameral	National Legislature		A member of the National Legislative Assembly cannot also be a member of the Council of States (and vice versa). The term of the National Legislature shall be four years from July 9, 2011. The Constitution is a transitional Constitution and the terms relating to future general elections are not contained in it. However, there are provisions included for by-elections should vaccancies arise during the first four-year period.
South Sudan	bicameral	Council of States (50)	National Legislative Assembly (170)	A member of the National Legislative Assembly cannot also be a member of the Council of States (and vice versa). The term of the National Legislature shall be four years from July 9, 2011. The Constitution is a transitional Constitution and the terms relating to future general elections are not contained in it. However, there are provisions included for by-elections should vaccancies arise during the first four-year period.
Sudan	bicameral	National Legislature		Members of the National Legislature are elected to six-year terms. Members of the National Assembly are appointed by the government; members of the Council of States are elected by the state legislatures.
Sudan	bicameral	National Assembly (Majlis Watani)(450)	Council of States (Majlis Welayat)(50)	Members of the National Legislature are elected to six-year terms. Members of the National Assembly are appointed by the government; members of the Council of States are elected by the state legislatures.
Eswatini	bicameral	Parliament (Libandla)		Members of the House of Assembly are elected to five-year terms in single-member constituencies corresponding to the tinkhundlas (tribal communities): 14 are located in the Hhohho, 11 in Lubombo, 16 in Manzini, and 14 in Shiselweni. Candidates are first nominated at the tinkhundla level and face a primary election, with a run-off for the top three finishers, where the candidate who receives the most votes is declared elected. The King of Swaziland appoints 10 members to the House. Members of the Senate are elected to five-year terms; 20 members are appointed by the King, 10 are elected by the House of Assembly.
Eswatini	bicameral	House of Assembly (55)	National Council (30)	
Tanzania	unicameral	National Assembly or Bunge (324)		Members are elected to five-year terms; 236 elected in single-seat constituencies (181 from Tanganyika, 50 from Zanzibar); 75 (20%) are women nominated by the President of Tanzania by party; 10 are appointed by the president; the remaining two are ex officio members. Zanzibar has its own House of Representatives to make laws especially for Zanzibar. The House of Representatives of Zanzibar has 81 members who serve five-year terms, 50 elected in single-member constituencies using plurality voting; 10 appointed by the President of Zanzibar; five are reserved for government-appointed regional commissioners; 15 seats are reserved for women and are filled on a party basis; the final seat is reserved for the Attorney-General.
Togo	unicameral	National Assembly (Assemblée Nationale) (81)		Members are elected to five-year terms in single-member constituencies in using a two-round run-off system.
Tunisia	unicameral	Assembly of the Representatives of the People (Majlis Nawwāb ash-Sha‘b) (217)		Semi-proportional representation based on multi-member constituency party-lists
Uganda	unicameral	National Assembly (319)		Members of the National Assembly members are elected to five-year terms; 215 in single-member constituencies; 78 from special interest groups, including 69 District Women Representatives, 10 army representatives, five youth representatives, five representatives for the disabled, and five from trade unions; 13 are ex officio members.
Sahrawi Republic	unicameral	Sahrawi National Council (101)		According to the Constitution of the Sahrawi Arab Democratic Republic, the Sahrawi National Council is uniquely identified with the Polisario Front as long as the SADR is a government in exile. Delegates are elected at the General Popular Congresses by delegates from the refugee camps of Tindouf, Algeria, supplemented by representatives of the Sahrawi People's Liberation Army and the constitutionally defined popular organizations (representing youth, women, and labor).
Zambia	unicameral	National Assembly (159)		Members are elected to five-year terms; 150 in single-member constituencies using simple plurality, eight are appointed by the President of Zambia, and one is an ex officio member.
Zimbabwe	bicameral	Parliament		Members of the House of Assembly are elected to five-year terms; 120 in single-member constituencies using the simple majority, 12 are appointed by the President of Zimbabwe, eight are provincial governors who hold reserved seats; 10 are held by traditional chiefs who are chosen by their peers. In the Senate, 50 members (five from each province) are directly elected in single-member constituencies by simple majority, six are appointed by the president, and additional members and the remaining 10 seats are held by traditional chiefs who are chosen in separate elections.
Zimbabwe	bicameral	House of Assembly (150)	Senate (66)	

== See also ==
- Enlargement of the African Union
