= Chairperson of the African Union =

AU's ceremonial head

- Flag of the African Union

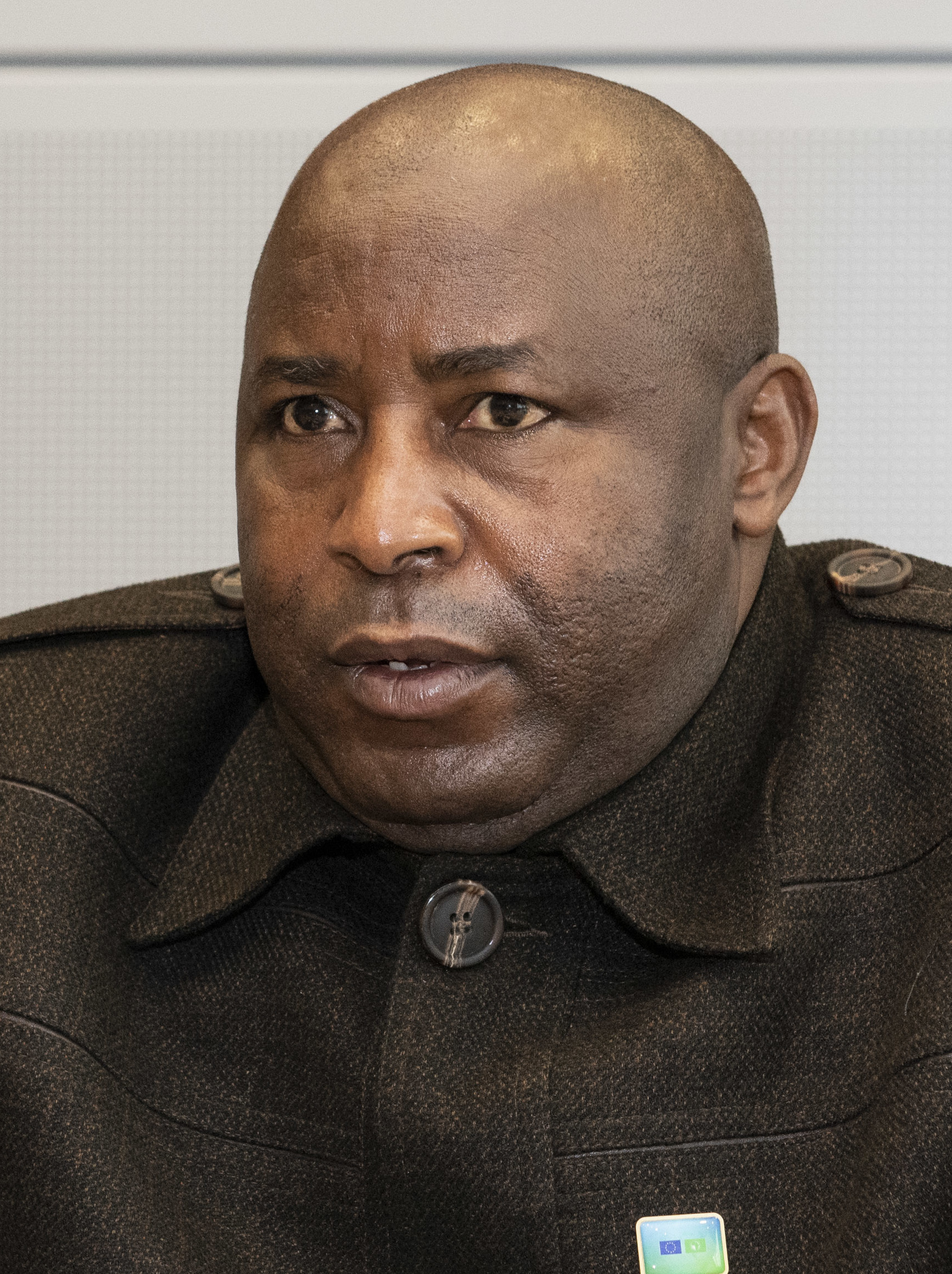
- Incumbent; Évariste Ndayishimiye since 14 February 2026
- Style: Excellency
- Abbreviation: CPAU
- Appointer: the Assembly
- Term length: One year
- Constituting instrument: Constitutive Act of the AU (article 6)
- Precursor: Chairperson of the OAU
- Formation: 9 July 2002
- First holder: Thabo Mbeki
- Deputy: Bureau
- Website: au.int/en/cpau

The Chairperson of the African Union is the ceremonial head of the African Union (AU) elected by the Assembly of Heads of State and Government for a one-year term. It rotates among the continent's five regions.

A candidate must be selected by consensus or at least two-thirds majority vote by member states. The chairperson is expected to complete the term without interruption; hence countries with impending elections may be ineligible.

The current Chairperson is Burundian President Évariste Ndayishimiye.

== History ==
In 2002, South African President Thabo Mbeki served as the inaugural chairman of the union. The post rotates annually amongst the five geographic regions of Africa; and over the years it has assumed the following order: East, North, Southern, Central and West Africa.

In January 2007, the assembly elected Ghanaian President John Kufuor over Sudan's President Omar al-Bashir due to the ongoing conflict in Darfur. Amnesty International said it would undermine African Union's credibility and Chad threatened to withdraw its membership. Western governments also lobbied against Sudan and suggested Tanzania as a compromise candidate from the East African region. By consensus, Ghana was elected instead as it was celebrating its 50th independence anniversary that year.

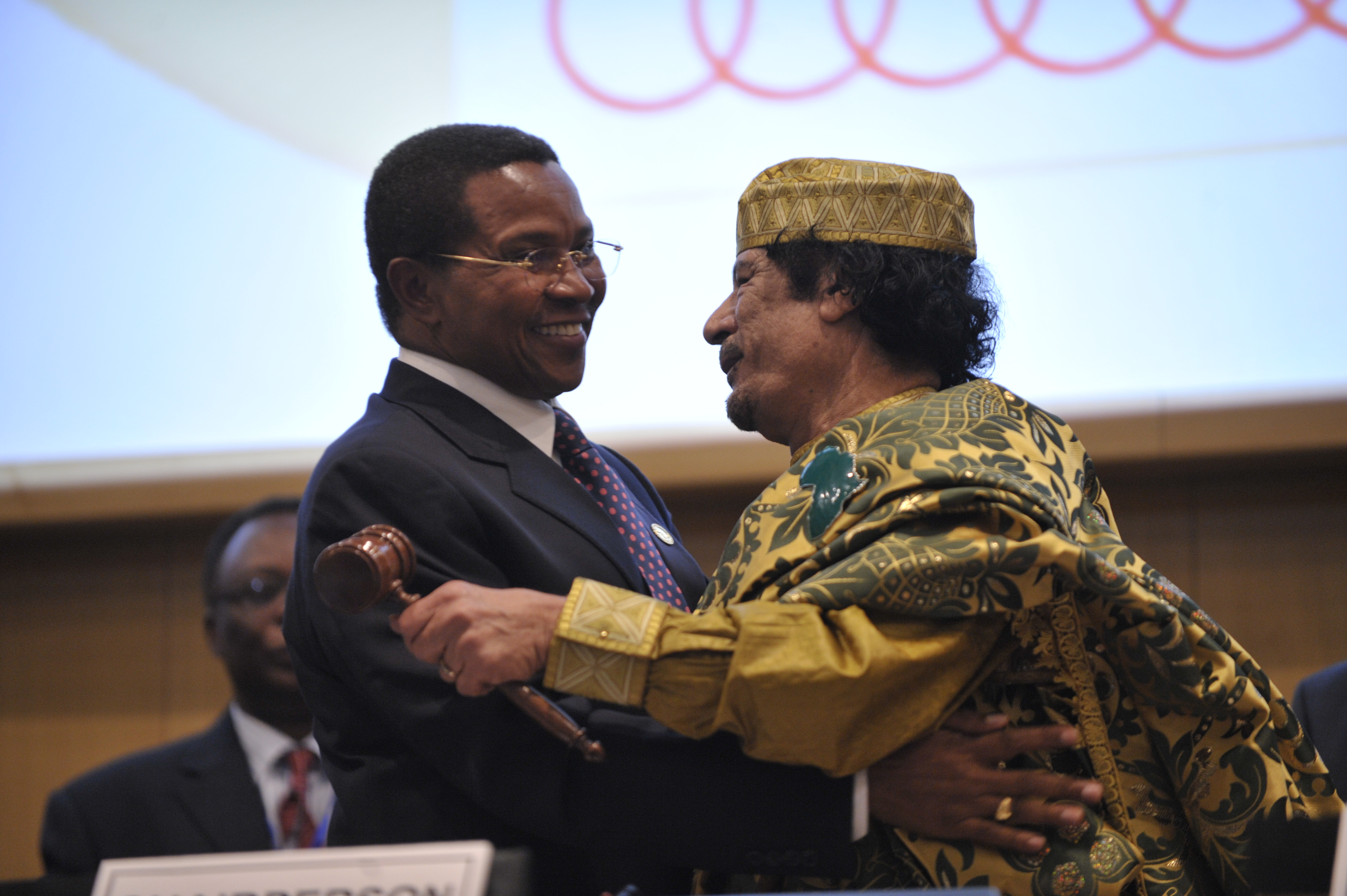
Gaddafi holding the ceremonial baton after taking over as Chair from Tanzania's Jakaya Kikwete.

In January 2010, Libyan Leader Muammar Gaddafi unsuccessfully tried to extend his tenure by an additional year, saying more time was needed in order to implement his vision for a United States of Africa - of which he was a strong proponent. Libya was at the time one of the largest financial supporters of the AU. Malawi was chosen instead.

The election of Equatoguinean President Teodoro Obiang Nguema Mbasogo in January 2011 was criticized by human rights activists as it undermined the AU's commitment to democracy.

Congolese Republic President Denis Sassou Nguesso and Zimbabwean President Robert Mugabe have both led the AU and its predecessor, the Organisation of African Unity during the terms 1986–88 and 2006–07, and 1997–98 and 2015–16 respectively.

In 2023, both Kenya and Comoros were vying for the position. Comorian President Azali Assoumani thanked Kenyan President William Ruto for his country's withdrawal. In 2024, Both Algeria and Morocco were interested in the position in 2024. Mauritania was elected instead.

For 2025, Botswana had sought an interest; however Angola was selected.

== Role ==
The incumbent chairs the biannual summit meetings of the assembly and represents the continent in various international fora such as G7, TICAD, FOCAC and G20 summits.

They also assist in resolving crises on the continent as an elder statesman. It has been suggested that liaison offices be established to prevent friction between the incumbent and the Commission Chairperson at the headquarters in Addis Ababa.

=== Elder statesman ===
In 2008, following Kenya's post-election crisis, AU Chairman Jakaya Kikwete was instrumental in facilitating the opposing sides to agree to a Government of National Unity. Kikwete also backed the invasion of Anjouan by sending an AU Force to assist the Comoros federal government to remove renegade leader Mohamed Bacar.

== List of chairpersons ==
No.	Portrait	Name	Term of office		Country	Region	Ref.
No.	Portrait	Name	Took office	Left office	Country	Region	Ref.
1		Thabo Mbeki	9 July 2002	10 July 2003	South Africa	Southern Africa	
2		Joaquim Chissano	10 July 2003	11 July 2004	Mozambique	Southern Africa	
3		Olusegun Obasanjo	11 July 2004	24 January 2006	Nigeria	West Africa	
4		Denis Sassou Nguesso	24 January 2006	24 January 2007	Republic of Congo	Central Africa	
5		John Kufuor	30 January 2007	31 January 2008	Ghana	West Africa	
6		Jakaya Kikwete	31 January 2008	2 February 2009	Tanzania	East Africa	
7		Muammar Gaddafi	2 February 2009	31 January 2010	Libya	North Africa	
8		Bingu wa Mutharika	31 January 2010	31 January 2011	Malawi	Southern Africa	
9		Teodoro Obiang Nguema Mbasogo	31 January 2011	29 January 2012	Equatorial Guinea	Central Africa	
10		Yayi Boni	29 January 2012	27 January 2013	Benin	West Africa	
11		Hailemariam Desalegn	27 January 2013	30 January 2014	Ethiopia	East Africa	
12		Mohamed Ould Abdel Aziz	30 January 2014	30 January 2015	Mauritania	North Africa	
13		Robert Mugabe	30 January 2015	30 January 2016	Zimbabwe	Southern Africa	
14		Idriss Déby	30 January 2016	30 January 2017	Chad	Central Africa	
15		Alpha Condé	30 January 2017	28 January 2018	Guinea	West Africa	
16		Paul Kagame	28 January 2018	10 February 2019	Rwanda	East Africa	
17		Abdel Fattah el-Sisi	10 February 2019	9 February 2020	Egypt	North Africa	
18		Cyril Ramaphosa	9 February 2020	6 February 2021	South Africa	Southern Africa	
19		Félix Tshisekedi	6 February 2021	5 February 2022	Democratic Republic of Congo	Central Africa	
20		Macky Sall	5 February 2022	18 February 2023	Senegal	West Africa	
21		Azali Assoumani	18 February 2023	17 February 2024	Comoros	East Africa	
22		Mohamed Ould Ghazouani	17 February 2024	15 February 2025	Mauritania	North Africa	
23		João Lourenço	15 February 2025	14 February 2026	Angola	Southern Africa	
24		Évariste Ndayishimiye	14 February 2026	Incumbent	Burundi	East Africa	

=== Bureau ===
The Chairperson is assisted by a bureau of three vice chairpersons including a rapporteur.

Portrait	Incumbent	Country	Region	Title
	John Mahama	Ghana	West Africa	First Vice Chairperson
	Samia Suluhu Hassan	Tanzania	Eastern Africa	Second Vice Chairperson
	TBC	TBC	North Africa	Third Vice Chairperson
	João Lourenço	Angola	South Africa	Rapporteur
