= Member states of the African Union =

Member states of the AU in dark green, suspended states in light green

The member states of the African Union are the 55 sovereign states that have ratified or acceded to the Constitutive Act of the African Union to become member states to the African Union (AU). The AU was the successor to the Organisation of African Unity (OAU), and AU membership was open to all OAU member states.

From an original membership of 36 states when the OAU was established on 25 May 1963, there have been nineteen successive enlargements—the largest occurring on 18 July 1975 when four states joined. Morocco is the newest member state, having joined on 31 January 2017. Morocco was a founding member of the OAU but withdrew in 1984 following the organization's acceptance of the Sahrawi Arab Democratic Republic as a member state, which claims the sovereignty of the disputed territory of Western Sahara with Morocco.

The AU spans the entirety of the African continent, with the exception of the Spanish North Africa semi-enclaves of Ceuta, Melilla, and Vélez de la Gomera. Island states are also members of the AU, but not the offshore islands that belong to the transcontinental countries of France, Italy, Portugal, Spain, United Kingdom and Yemen. The 55 member states are grouped into five regions.

The African Union is composed of fifty-two republics and three monarchies. The total population of the AU is in excess of 1.5 billion.

== Current members ==
Currently suspended

State	Accession	Population	Area (km^{2})	Capital	Language(s)	Notes
Algeria	1963-05-25	43,088,000	2,381,741	Algiers	Arabic; Berber	
Angola	1979-02-11	30,053,000	1,246,700	Luanda	Portuguese	
Benin	1963-05-25	11,722,000	112,622	Porto-Novo	French	Known as Dahomey until 1975.
Botswana	1966-10-31	2,378,000	600,370	Gaborone	English; Setswana	
Burkina Faso	1963-05-25	20,000,000	274,000	Ouagadougou	French	Known as Upper Volta until 1984. Suspended in September 2015 after a brief military coup. Suspended again in January 2022 after another military coup.
Burundi	1963-05-25	11,529,000	27,830	Gitega	English; French; Kirundi	
Cameroon	1963-05-25	25,506,000	475,442	Yaoundé	English; French	
Cabo Verde	1975-07-18	551,000	4,033	Praia	Portuguese	
Central African Republic	1963-05-25	5,181,000	622,984	Bangui	French; Sango	Suspended from March 2013 to April 2016 during the Central African Republic Civil War
Chad	1963-05-25	12,802,000	1,284,000	N'Djamena	Arabic; French	
Comoros	1975-07-18	872,000	2,235	Moroni	Arabic; Comorian; French	
Democratic Republic of the Congo	1963-05-25	91,931,000	2,344,858	Kinshasa	French	Known as Zaire from 1971 to 1997.
Republic of the Congo	1963-05-25	4,500,000	342,000	Brazzaville	French	
Djibouti	1977-06-27	1,078,000	23,200	Djibouti	Arabic; French	
Egypt	1963-05-25	99,211,000	1,002,450	Cairo	Arabic	Suspended from July 2013 until June 2014 following the 2013 Egyptian coup d'état
Equatorial Guinea	1968-10-12	887,000	28,051	Malabo	French; Portuguese; Spanish	
Eritrea	1993-05-24	6,159,000	117,600	Asmara	Arabic; Tigrinya	
Eswatini	1968-09-24	1,177,000	17,364	Lobamba (royal and legislative); Mbabane (administrative)	English; Swati	Known as Swaziland from 1968 to 2018.
Ethiopia	1963-05-25	96,633,458	1,104,300	Addis Ababa	Afar; Amharic; Oromo; Somali; Tigrinya	
Gabon	1963-05-25	2,080,000	267,745	Libreville	French	Suspended from 31 August 2023 to 30 April 2025 following a military coup.
Gambia	1965-10-01	2,238,000	10,380	Banjul	English	
Ghana	1963-05-25	29,742,000	238,535	Accra	English	
Guinea	1963-05-25	13,627,000	245,857	Conakry	French	Suspended from December 2008 to January 2011 after the 2008 Guinean coup d'état. Suspended again from September 2021 to January 2026 after another coup.
Guinea-Bissau	1973-11-19	1,776,000	36,544	Bissau	Portuguese	Suspended from April 2012 until June 2014 following the 2012 Guinea-Bissau coup d'état. Suspended again on 29 November 2025 following another coup d'état.
Côte d'Ivoire	1963-05-25	26,275,000	322,460	Yamoussoukro	French	Suspended after the 2010–2011 Ivorian crisis.
Kenya	1963-12-13	50,000,000	580,367	Nairobi	English; Swahili	
Lesotho	1966-10-31	2,048,000	30,355	Maseru	English; Sesotho	
Liberia	1963-05-25	5,000,000	111,369	Monrovia	English	
Libya	1963-05-25	6,578,000	1,759,541	Tripoli	Arabic	
Madagascar	1963-05-25	27,055,000	587,041	Antananarivo	French; Malagasy	Suspended from December 2001 – 10 July 2003 and from 20 March 2009 – 27 January 2014 after a political crisis. Suspended again in 2025 due to a military coup.
Malawi	1964-07-13	20,289,000	118,484	Lilongwe	Chichewa; English	
Mali	1963-05-25	20,161,000	1,240,192	Bamako	Bambara; Bobo; Bozo; Dogon, Toro So; Fula; Hassaniya Arabic; Kassonke; Maninke; Minyanka; Senufo, Senara; Songhay, Koyraboro Senni; Soninke; Tamasheq	Suspended from 23 March 2012 until October 2013 after a military coup. Suspended again from 19 August to 8 October 2020 due to a military coup. Currently suspended since 1 June 2021 after another coup.
Mauritania	1963-05-25	3,516,806	1,030,700	Nouakchott	Arabic	Suspended 4 August 2005 after a military coup. Presidential elections were held in March 2007. Suspended 6 August 2008 after a military coup.
Mauritius	1968-08-01	1,279,000	2,040	Port Louis	English; French	
Morocco	1963-05-25	35,587,000	446,550	Rabat	Arabic; Berber	Originally joined the AU's predecessor, the OAU, in 1963. However, withdrew in 12 November 1984 when a majority of member states supported the admission of the Sahrawi Arab Democratic Republic, as an OAU member. AU membership approved on 31 January 2017.
Mozambique	1975-07-18	31,157,000	801,590	Maputo	Portuguese	
Namibia	1990-06-01	2,408,000	825,418	Windhoek	English	
Niger	1963-05-25	20,000,000	1,267,000	Niamey	French	Suspended from 19 February 2010 until 16 March 2011 after a military coup and until the subsequent transition to a civilian administration. Suspended again on 22 August 2023 following another military coup.
Nigeria	1963-05-25	199,206,000	923,768	Abuja	English	
Rwanda	1963-05-25	12,432,000	26,798	Kigali	English; French; Kinyarwanda	
Sahrawi Arab Democratic Republic	1982-02-22	612,000	266,000	El Aaiun (de jure claimed); Tifariti (de facto temporary)	Arabic; Spanish	
São Tomé and Príncipe	1975-07-18	222,000	964	São Tomé	Portuguese	
Senegal	1963-05-25	16,793,000	196,723	Dakar	French	
Seychelles	1976-06-29	96,000	451	Victoria	English; French; Seychellois Creole	
Sierra Leone	1963-05-25	7,737,000	71,740	Freetown	English	
Somalia	1963-05-25	11,998,222	637,661	Mogadishu	Arabic; Somali	
South Africa	1994-06-06	58,333,000	1,221,037	Pretoria (executive); Bloemfontein (judicial); Cape Town (legislative)	Afrikaans; English; Southern Ndebele; Northern Sotho; Southern Sotho; Swazi; Tsonga; Tswana; Venda; Xhosa; Zulu	
South Sudan	2011-08-15	13,400,000	619,745	Juba	English	
Sudan	1963-05-25	43,222,000	1,886,068	Khartoum	Arabic; English	Suspended 6 June 2019 due to violence committed by the military following a coup d'état as part of the 2018–19 Sudanese protests. Suspension was lifted three months later on 6 September 2019. Suspended again on 25 October 2021 following another coup d'état.
Tanzania	1963-05-25	52,067,000	945,203	Dodoma	English; Swahili; (Zanzibar: Arabic)	Formed by a merger on 26 April 1964 of Tanganyika and Zanzibar, which had both become members on 25 May 1963.
Togo	1963-05-25	8,205,000	56,785	Lomé	French	Suspended 25 February 2005 after concerns over unconstitutional presidential appointment. Presidential elections were held 4 May 2005.
Tunisia	1963-05-25	11,800,000	163,610	Tunis	Arabic	
Uganda	1963-05-25	40,007,000	241,038	Kampala	English; Swahili	
Zambia	1964-12-16	18,321,000	752,618	Lusaka	English	
Zimbabwe	1980-06-01	15,658,000	390,757	Harare	English; Ndebele; Shona	

== Former members ==
Former African Union State	Years of membership	Population	Area (km^{2})	Capital	Language(s)	Notes
Tanganyika	1963–1964	49,000,000	942,433	Dar es Salaam	Swahili; English	Tanganyika and Zanzibar merged on 26 April 1964 to form the United Republic of Tanganyika and Zanzibar, which was renamed Tanzania on 1 November 1964
Zanzibar	1963–1964	1,303,569	2,461	Zanzibar City	Swahili; English	Tanganyika and Zanzibar merged on 26 April 1964 to form the United Republic of Tanganyika and Zanzibar, which was renamed Tanzania on 1 November 1964

== Accession ==
South Africa joined on 6 June 1994 after the end of the apartheid and the April 1994 general election.

South Sudan, which seceded from Sudan on 9 July 2011, joined the AU on 27 July 2011.

The AU's most recent member state is Morocco, having joined on 31 January 2017. Morocco withdrew from the OAU in 1984 following the organization's acceptance of the Sahrawi Arab Democratic Republic as a member state. Morocco rules over most of the territory, but sovereignty is disputed.

== See also ==
- List of African Union member states by political system
