= Charity Hanene Nchimunya =

African Union official (born 1971)

Executive Secretary of the African Union Advisory Board against Corruption
- Incumbent
- Assumed office 14 January 2016
- Preceded by: Adolphe Lawson

Personal details
- Born: Charity Hanene Nchimunya; 9 March 1971 (age 55) Zambia
- Spouse: Habadu Chrispin Nchimunya
- Children: 5
- Education: Copperbelt University, BBA; University of Sussex, MA
- Profession: Governance and Anti-corruption expert

Charity Hanene Nchimunya (born 9 March 1971 in Ndola) is a Zambian governance and anti-corruption expert who was appointed to the African Union Advisory Board against Corruption (AUABC) since 2016. The AUABC is one of the Organs of the African Union.

== Early life and education ==
Charity was born on 9 March 1971 in Ndola, a town on the Copperbelt Province of Zambia. She is the first of nine siblings, who did her primary and secondary education in the same city at the then Kanini Primary School and Fatima Girls Secondary School respectively. Charity holds a Bachelor of Business Administration (BBA) from the Copperbelt University and master's degree in governance and development from the Institute of Development Studies (IDS), at the University of Sussex under a joint scholarship by the then Canon Collins for Southern Africa and the prestigious Chevening Scholarship under what was known then as the Foreign and Commonwealth Office (FCO).

She also holds a post-graduate certificate in corruption studies from the school of professional and continuing education at the University of Hong Kong (HKU-SPACE).

== Career ==
Charity is the first female executive secretary to be appointed to the African Union Advisory Board against Corruption, an organ of the African Union. Prior to this, she held various senior leadership positions with the ZCCM Investments Holdings formerly (Zambia Consolidated Copper Mines) and Zambian Anti-Corruption Commission. Charity also worked for the GIZ zambian office as an advisor. Charity has spearheaded ratification of the African Union Convention on Preventing and Combating Corruption of forty-eight (48) State Parties in Africa. Among the most recent instrument targets compating the Illicit Financial Flows (IFFs)

== Personal life ==
Charity is married to Habadu Chrispin Nchimunya with five children. She is a devoted Seventh-day Adventist Christian, a Master Guide and a board member of the Arusha International Seventh-day Adventist Church. She is also an avid player of amateur lawn tennis and loves farming.

Diplomatic posts
Preceded by Adolphe Lawson	List of Executive Secretaries of the African Union Advisory Board against Corruption; 14 January 2016–present	Incumbent
