= Monarchies in Africa =

A map of Africa showing the continent's political systems: three monarchies (in red) and republics (in blue).

Monarchy was the prevalent form of government in the history of Africa, where self-governing states, territories, or nations existed in which supreme power resided with an individual who was recognized as the head of state. Many such states exist today. All are similar in that the sovereign inherits their office and typically keeps it until their death or until their abdication.

However, only three are currently sovereign, while the remaining are sub-national monarchies. Two of the former are constitutional monarchies (Lesotho and Morocco), in which the sovereign is bound by laws and customs in the exercise of their powers, and one is an absolute monarchy (Eswatini), in which the sovereign rules without bounds. The sub-national monarchies are not sovereign and exist within larger political associations, such as the Ashanti of Ghana, Bini of Nigeria, and the Xhosa and Zulu of South Africa. In addition to these, there are also three dependencies of two European monarchies—Saint Helena, Ascension and Tristan da Cunha of the United Kingdom and the Canary Islands and Ceuta and Melilla of Spain.

== History ==
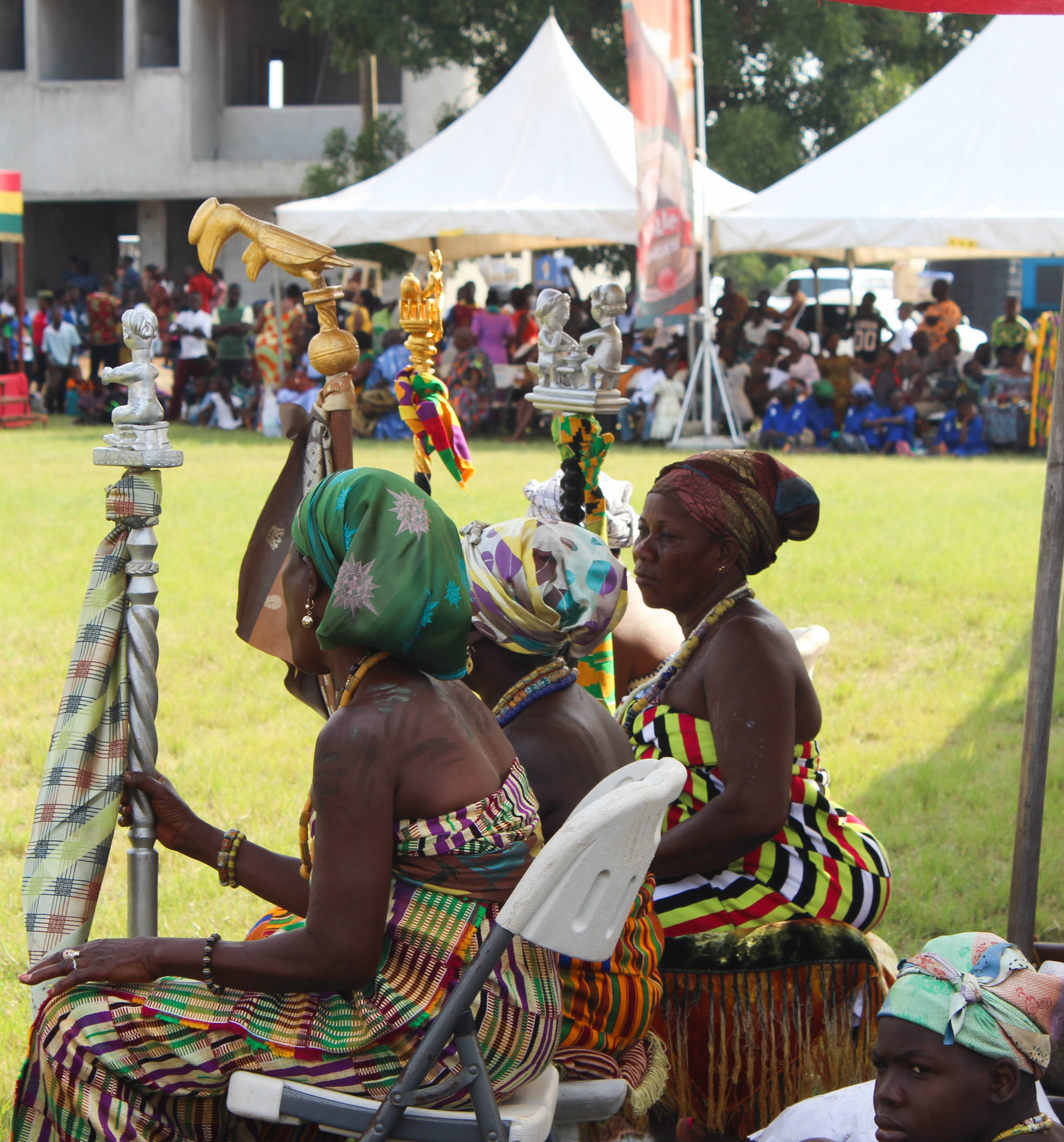
Queen mothers at a ceremony in Ghana.

Due to trans-Saharan trade, the early settlements of West Africa and the largely nomadic communities in North Africa had the capacity to support formal establishments and form states. Increased trade along the Nile Valley facilitated similar developments in East Africa. In response to this, authoritative leaderships developed to facilitate stable growth and interactions. An example is the emergence of the Sao civilisation as early as the 6th century BCE between the Bilma Oasis and Lake Chad.

Other monarchies were established with foreign intervention. One such intervention was by Rome in North Africa. The Kingdom of Numidia (in what is present-day Algeria) came to be established around 200 BC with Masinissa as the first king. He was one of the many kings who headed large indigenous communities in the North African coastal belt that engaged the trans-Saharan trade route for subsistence. With the tacit strategic support of Rome, Masinissa took control of all the nomadic communities and was crowned king.

== Current monarchies ==
State	Type	Succession	Dynasty	Title	Monarch	Reigning since	First in line
Kingdom of Morocco	Constitutional	Hereditary	Alaouite	King (ملك)	Mohammed VI	23 July 1999	Heir apparent: Moulay Hassan, Crown Prince of Morocco (first born son)
Kingdom of Eswatini	Absolute	Hereditary and elective	Dlamini	King (Ngwenyama)	Mswati III	25 April 1986	None; king cannot appoint his successor.
Kingdom of Lesotho	Constitutional	Hereditary and elective	Moshesh	King (Morena)	Letsie III	7 February 1996	Heir apparent: Prince Lerotholi Seeiso (only son)

=== Sovereign states ===
==== Lesotho ====

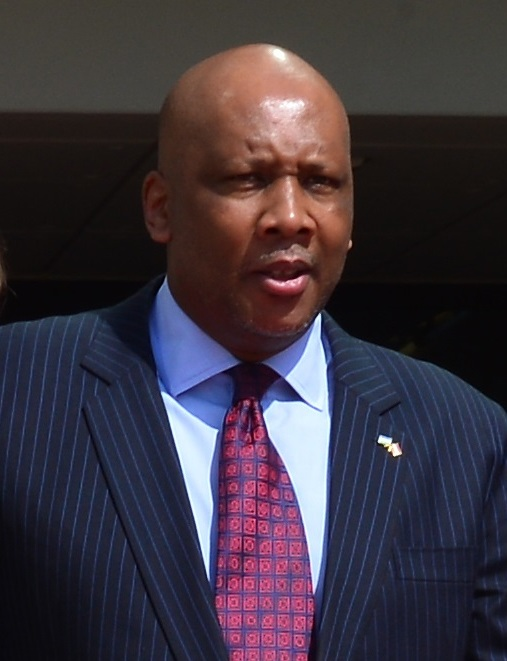
King Letsie III of Lesotho

Lesotho, an enclave of South Africa, is a constitutional elective monarchy. The current monarchy was established in 1824 when Moshoeshoe I, a tribal chieftain, united warring tribes into the Basotho kingdom. After his death in 1870, the kingdom was placed under the nominal control of the neighboring British Cape Colony; but, the native tribes engaged in a revolt, and full British control was not established until 1884 under the name Basutoland. While under British control, the monarchy continued under the title of Paramount Chief with a moderate degree of autonomy, particularly in the rural areas.

Formal independence was granted in 1966, and a constitutional monarchy was established. However, the democratically elected government was overthrown in 1970 by the Prime Minister in a self-coup. The monarchy was sidelined from then on, including a military government between 1986 and 1993, when democracy was restored. The current monarch, King Letsie III, ascended to the throne in 1996.

Under the current constitution, passed in 1993, the King is a constitutional monarch and the head of state, with power being exercised by the Parliament. While in practice hereditary, the King is officially appointed by the College of Chiefs using traditional practices. The College of Chiefs also appoints a regent if one is needed. The Prime Minister also has the power to declare the kingship vacant if the King either violates his oath of office or is deemed unfit to rule.

==== Morocco ====

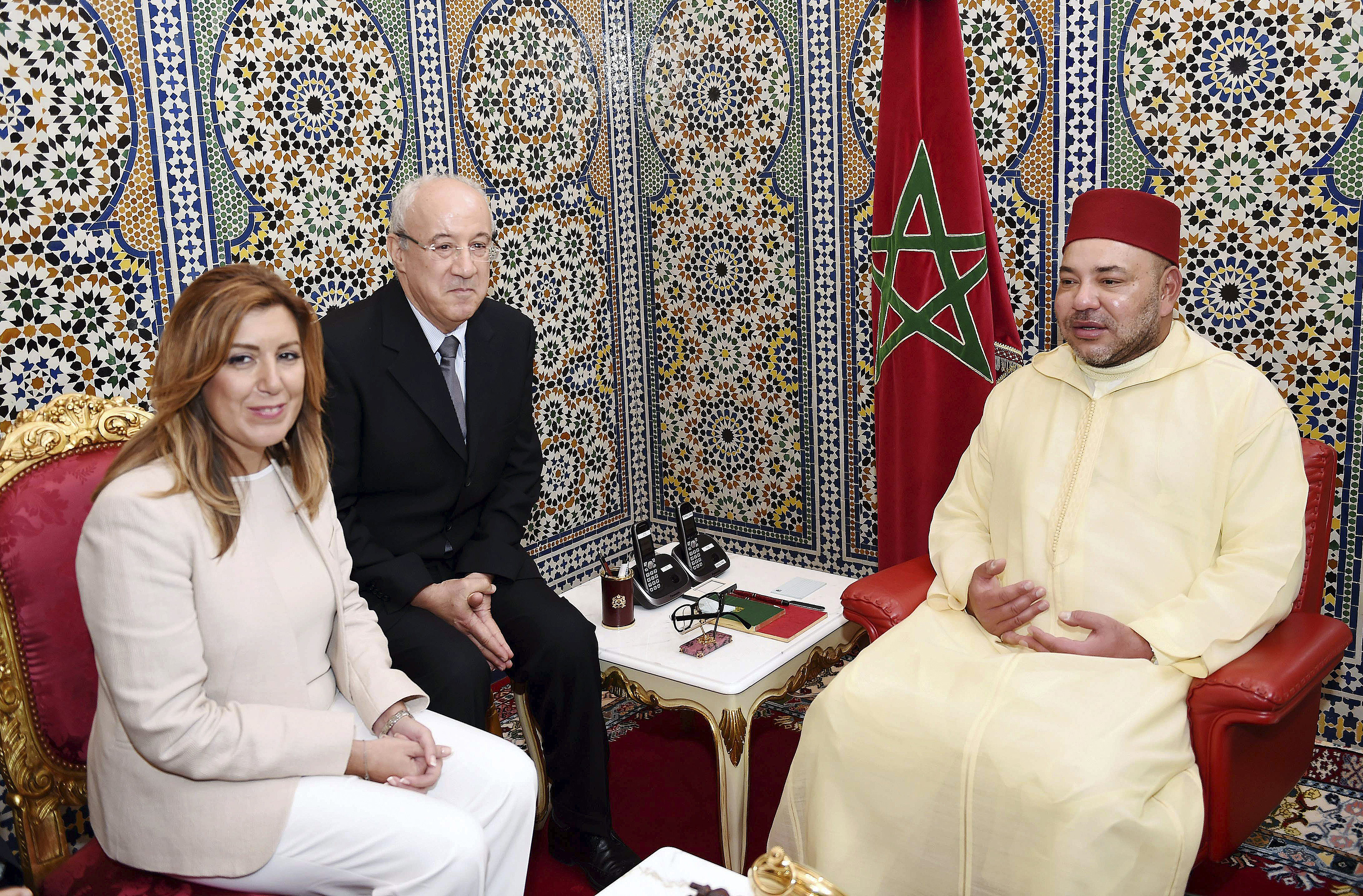
King Mohammed VI of Morocco (on the right)

Morocco, located in the northwestern corner of Africa, has a long and established history dating back to antiquity. Originally Carthaginian, the territory was controlled by the Roman Empire, the Vandals, and the Byzantine Empire before falling under Arab control in the seventh century. During that time, the inhabitants of Morocco were known as Moors. After the Reconquista in 1492, the Moroccan state underwent a long period of decline before falling under dual French and Spanish control in 1912. Independence was achieved in 1956, with Sultan Mohammed ben Youssef taking the title of King Mohammed V. The present King, Mohammed VI, ascended to the throne in 1999.

Under the current constitution passed in 2011, Morocco is a constitutional monarchy, though the King maintains a fair amount of power. He is the chair of the Superior Council of the Ulema, charged with maintaining Moroccan Islam, as well as Morocco's Supreme Court. The King is also an active member of the cabinet of Morocco, having the power to dismiss ministers as well as set the government agenda. He also chairs the Security Council, which oversees the military.

==== Eswatini (formerly Swaziland) ====

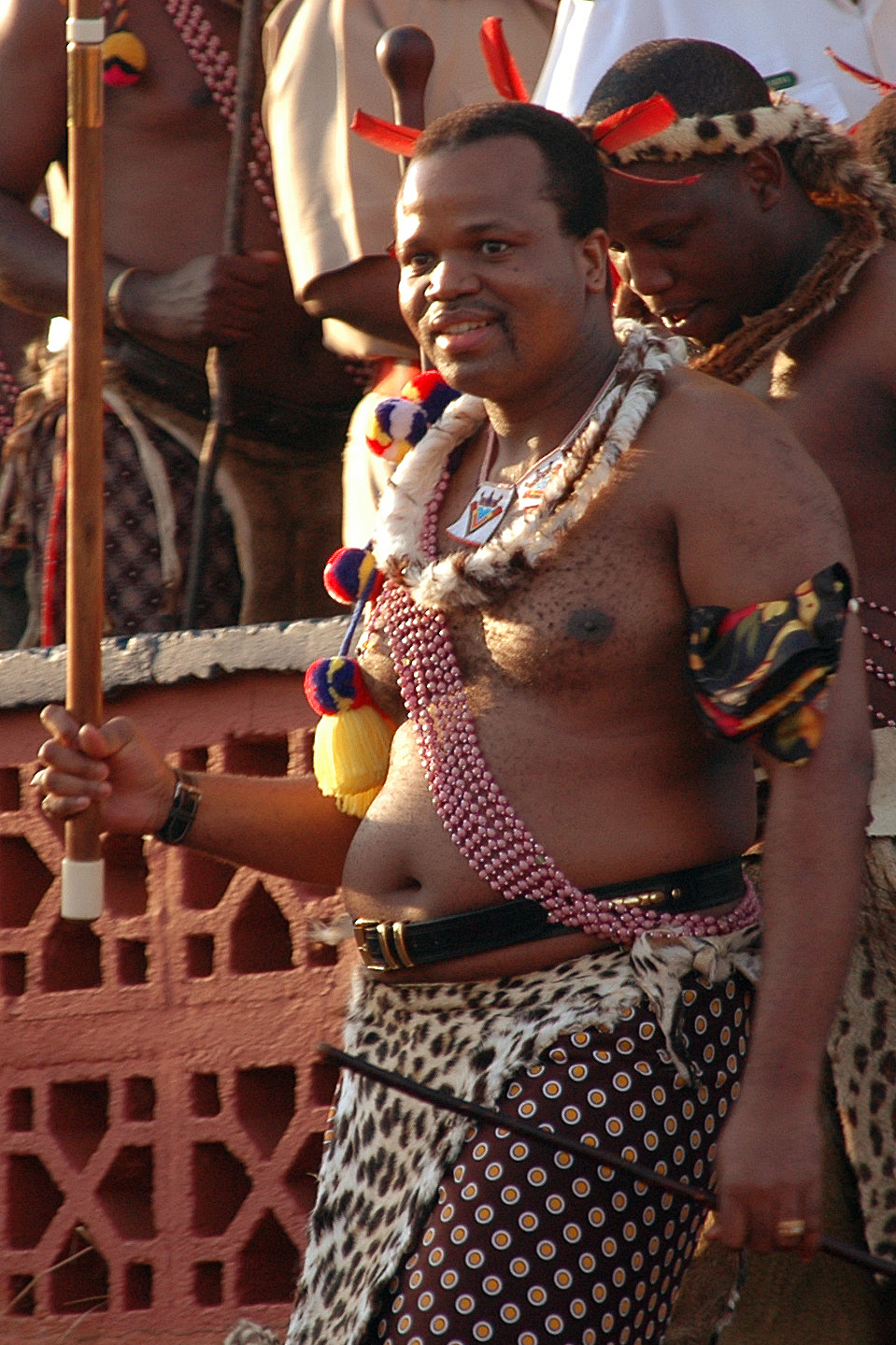
King Mswati III of Eswatini

Eswatini, in the southeastern corner of Africa, originated, like Lesotho, as a confederation of African tribes. However, it pre-dates Lesotho by approximately seventy-five years to the mid-eighteenth century. During that time period, Chief Ngwane III of the Swazi people moved his tribe to their present location and united with other African tribes. Beginning in the 1830s, British traders and the Boers (Dutch settlers) interacted with the Swazi tribe. Eventually, the illiterate Swazi unknowingly signed treaties which ceded their land to the Boer Republics, who assumed control in 1894. In 1902, after the Boer War, the British assumed control of Swaziland. It was not until 1967 that the Swazi regained control of internal affairs, and independence was gained the following year.

For most of the colonial period, the Swazi were ruled by Sobhuza II, who became king upon independence. In 1973, Sobhuza abolished the democratic constitution put in place at the time of independence and declared himself absolute ruler. Upon his death in 1982, Sobhuza had reigned for eighty-two years, the longest verified reign of any monarch. The present ruler, King Mswati III, ascended to the throne in 1986. A new constitution established in 1998 allowed for some degree of democratic rule; but, in practice, Eswatini remains an absolute monarchy, and the ability of citizens to participate in the political process is limited.

=== Dependencies of other sovereign states ===
==== Canary Islands ====

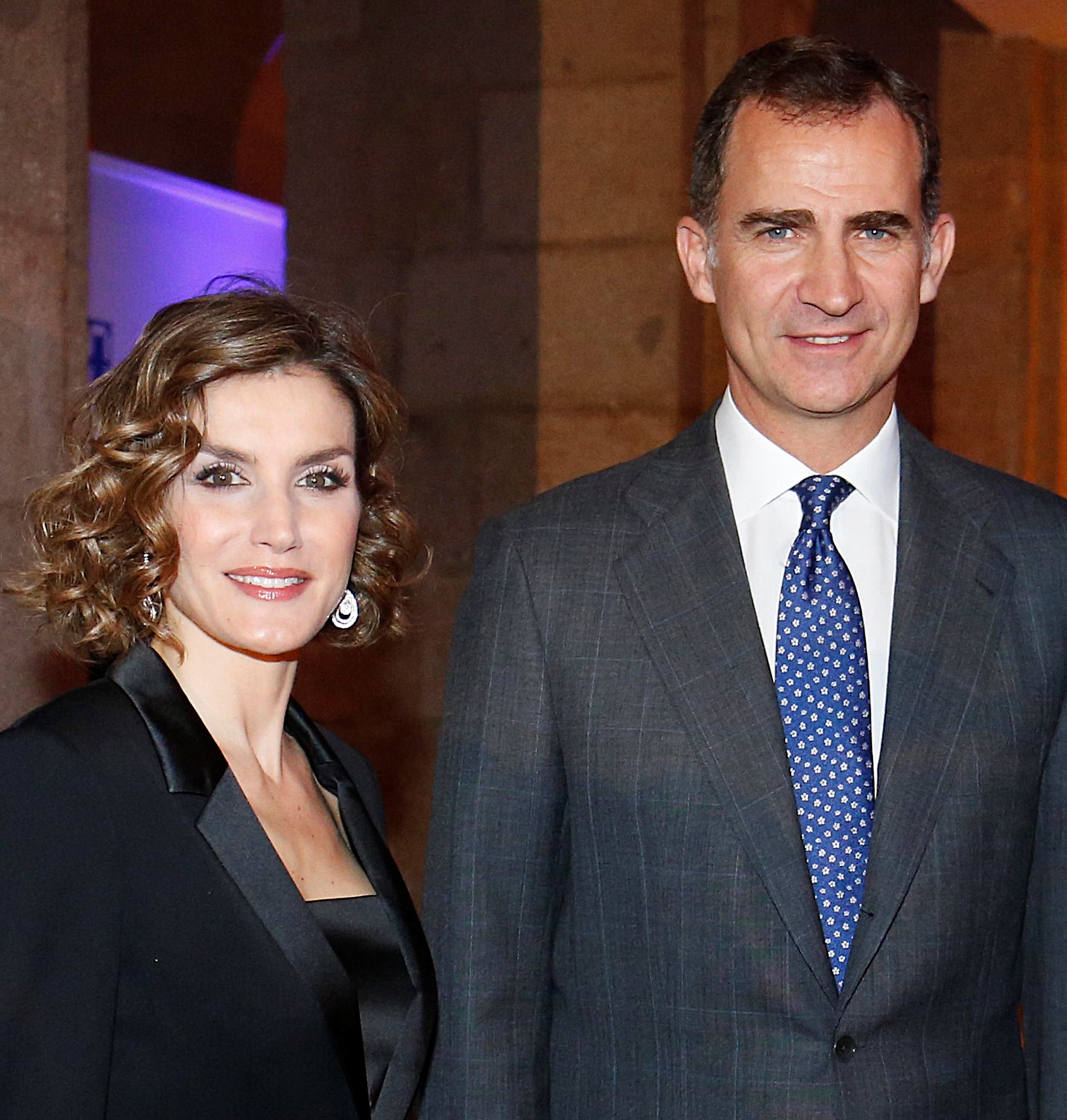
King Felipe VI of Spain and Queen Letizia

The Canary Islands are an archipelago of thirteen islands located off the coast of Morocco. The islands were originally inhabited by the Guanche people, but were colonized by Crown of Castile. During the fifteenth century, they were controlled by Prince Henry the Navigator of Portugal, but Spain regained control in 1479. Spain completed its conquest of the islands in 1496 and used them as a port of western exploration. Due to their importance to Spanish trade, they were frequently attacked by pirates and privateers such as Sir Francis Drake in 1595. The islands were granted autonomy in 1982.

As an autonomous community of Spain, the Canaries have a substantial degree of autonomy. The community government is organized as a parliamentary system with a President elected from amongst the members of Parliament. The community government has autonomy concerning a wide range of competencies, including over natural resources and tourism as well as a unique fiscal system. It shares power concerning agriculture and trade with the central government in Spain, and has the responsibility to oversee the implementation of actions taken by the central government in the competencies which the community government does not have autonomy. Each island also has a substantial degree of autonomy from the community government to control its own local affairs.

==== Ceuta and Melilla ====

Ceuta and Melilla are two cities on the northwestern coast of Africa bordering Morocco. Both were founded by the Carthaginians and later fell under successive Roman, Vandal, and Byzantine control before being conquered by the Arabs in the eighth century. Ceuta, in particular, served as the base for the Moorish conquest of Spain during that time period. In 1415, Ceuta was conquered by the Portuguese, with Melilla falling to the Spanish in 1497. When the kingdoms of Spain and Portugal united in 1580, Ceuta also came under Spanish control and has remained Spanish ever since. During the Spanish-Moroccan War, both cities gained additional territory to expand to the present boundaries. Autonomy was granted to both cities in 1995. Today, Morocco still claims that the two cities are part of Moroccan territory, which has created tension between the neighboring countries.

Both cities' governments are parliamentary in nature, with an additional mayor-council system acting as the executive power. The cities have a wide degree of autonomy, with responsibility vested in the central government only in areas concerning communication and trade affairs. They both have fiscal autonomy which allows them to tax residents in order to fund many of the city services such as police.

==== Saint Helena, Ascension and Tristan da Cunha ====

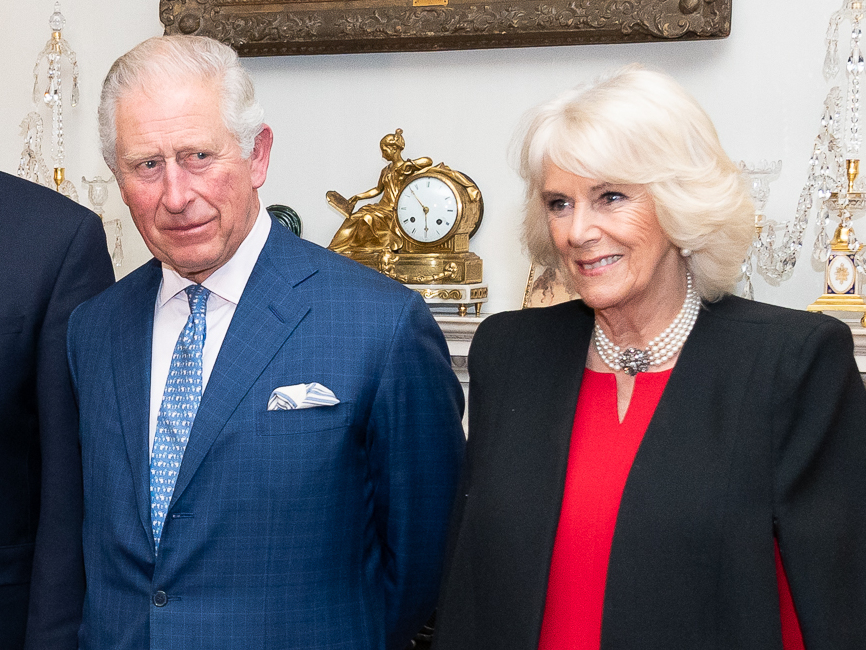
King Charles III of the United Kingdom and Queen Camilla

Saint Helena, Ascension and Tristan da Cunha is a British Overseas Territory in the Atlantic Ocean. Saint Helena was first discovered by a series of Portuguese explorers between 1602 and 1604. They built a number of structures upon it and began to use it as a way station, which was never considered a permanent settlement.

During the interregnum in England, the Honourable East India Company received a charter to govern the island from Oliver Cromwell. For close to two hundred years afterwards, Company rule was maintained by the British, only ending in the early 1800s when sovereignty passed directly to the British. Ascension island was added to the territory in the 1920s, and Tristan da Cunha was likewise added in the following decade. Presently, the territory is ruled by Charles III, King of Saint Helena, who is represented locally by a governor.

=== Sub-national monarchies ===
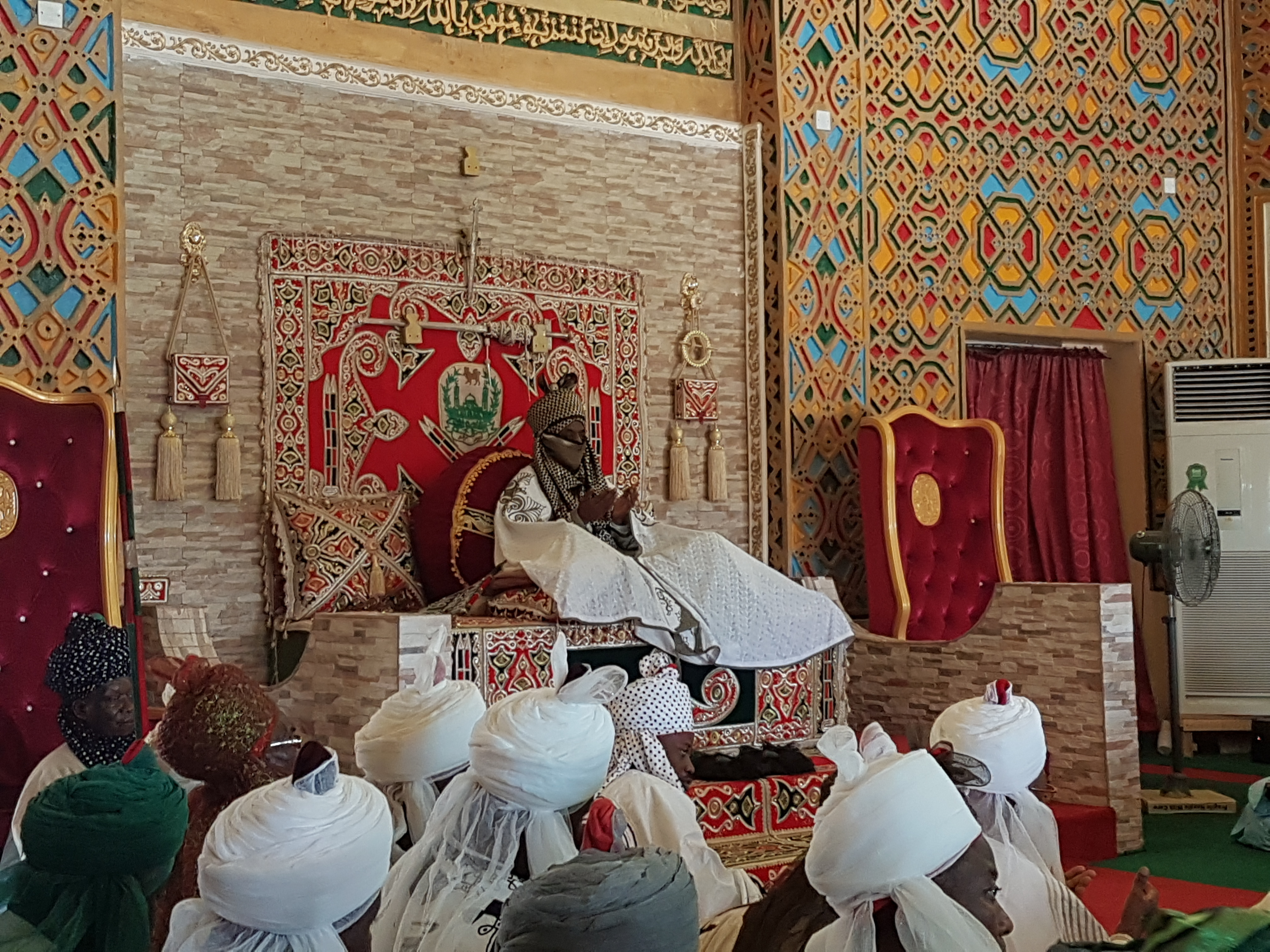
The 14th Emir of Kano, Nigeria, Muhammadu Sanusi II, on his throne before the Durbar, September 2016

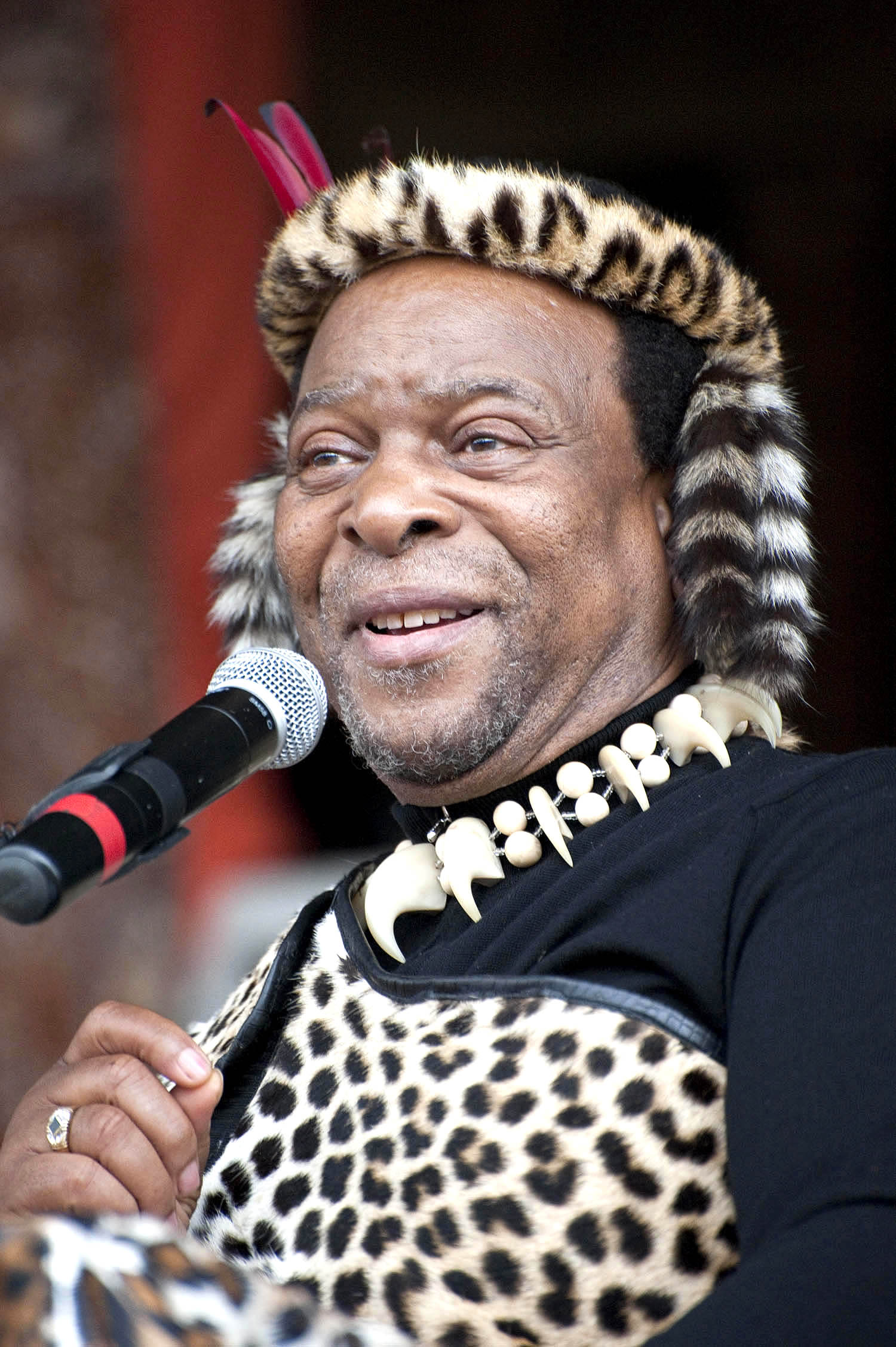
Goodwill Zwelithini, Zulu King (1968-2021), at a tribal event in South Africa

In addition to independent African monarchical states, a series of sub-national polities exist as constituencies of a number of the 52 remaining sovereign states of Africa. Traditional authority is vested in the monarchs of these constituencies by virtue of customary law as a general rule, although some of them also enjoy either a constitutional or a statutory recognition of their titles in the states that host them. Such figures as the Nigerian traditional rulers and the Zulu King of South Africa typify the class.

== Former monarchies ==
=== Pre-colonial Africa ===
- Iron Age empires of North Africa
- Ancient Egyptian civilization
- Medieval (8th to 13th century) Islamic empires (caliphates) in North Africa
- the medieval Sahelian kingdoms
- Ethiopian Empire (abolished 1975)
- empires of the "transitional period" of the 15th to 19th centuries.
  - Islamic sultanates of the Sudan and the great Somali Empire (Golden Empire)
  - kingdoms of West Africa succeeding the Sahelian kingdoms
  - kingdoms of Central and Southern Africa such as the Kongo Kingdom and the Mutapa Empire.
- The Merina Kingdom of Madagascar.
- Kingdom of Rwanda (abolished 1961)
- Kingdom of Burundi (abolished 1966)

=== 20th century ===
- Ankole (Uganda) (abolished 1967)
- Central African Empire (abolished 1979)
- Congo Free State (annexed by Belgium 1908)
- Kingdom of Egypt (abolished 1953)
- Kingdom of Libya (abolished 1969)
- Kingdom of Tunisia (abolished 1957)
- Sultanate of Zanzibar (abolished 1964)

Former Commonwealth realms
Country	Head of State	Representative	Abolished
The Gambia	Elizabeth II	Governor-General Sir Farimang Mamadi Singateh	abolished 1970
Ghana	Elizabeth II	Governor-General The Earl of Listowel	abolished 1960
Kenya	Elizabeth II	Governor-General Malcolm MacDonald	abolished 1964
Malawi	Elizabeth II	Governor-General Sir Glyn Smallwood Jones	abolished 1966
Mauritius	Elizabeth II	Governor-General Sir Veerasamy Ringadoo	abolished 1992
Nigeria	Elizabeth II	Governor-General Nnamdi Azikiwe	abolished 1963
Rhodesia	Elizabeth II	Officer Administering the Government Clifford Dupont	not recognised; abolished by Rhodesia in 1970
Sierra Leone	Elizabeth II	Governor-General Christopher Okoro Cole	abolished 1971
Union of South Africa	Elizabeth II	Governor-General Charles Robberts Swart	abolished 1961
Tanganyika	Elizabeth II	Governor-General Sir Richard Turnbull	abolished 1962
Uganda	Elizabeth II	Governor-General Sir Walter Coutts	abolished 1963

== See also ==
- Afro-Bolivian monarchy
- List of political parties in Africa by country
- Politics of Africa
