= Assembly of the African Union =

Decision-making body within the African Union

The Assembly of the African Union, which is formally known as the African Union Assembly of Heads of State and Government (AU-AHSG), is one of several decision-making bodies within the African Union. The other bodies are the Pan-African Parliament; the Executive Council, consisting of foreign ministers of the AU members states; and the African Union Commission. The Assembly of the African Union consists of the 55 heads of state and government of the member countries. The Assembly meets once a year.

The Chairperson of the Assembly presides the annual African Union Summit as well as the Pan-African Parliament during the election and swearing in of the President of the Pan-African Parliament.

== History ==
The Assembly came into existence on 25 May 1963, as part of the ratification of Organization of African Unity (OAU). Initially the Assembly consisted of 32 independent members, the heads of state of the African states that had achieved independence by 1963. Until 2001, the governing constitution of the Assembly was the OAU Charter. The Assembly is now subject to the Union Act that created the African Union.

== Functions ==
The Assembly has nine basic functions:

1. Set policies of the Union.
2. Decide on what action to take after consideration of reports and recommendations from the other organs of the Union.
3. Consider membership requests into the Union.
4. Create bodies for the Union.
5. Monitor the implementation of policies and decisions of the Union as well ensure compliance by all Member States.
6. Create a budget of the Union.
7. Provide direction to the Executive Council on conflicts, war and other emergency situations and the restoration of peace.
8. Select judges for and withdraw judges of the Court of Justice.
9. Appoint the Chairman of the Commission, Commissioners of the Commission, all respective deputies and determine how long they will serve and what duties they will perform.

== Decisions ==
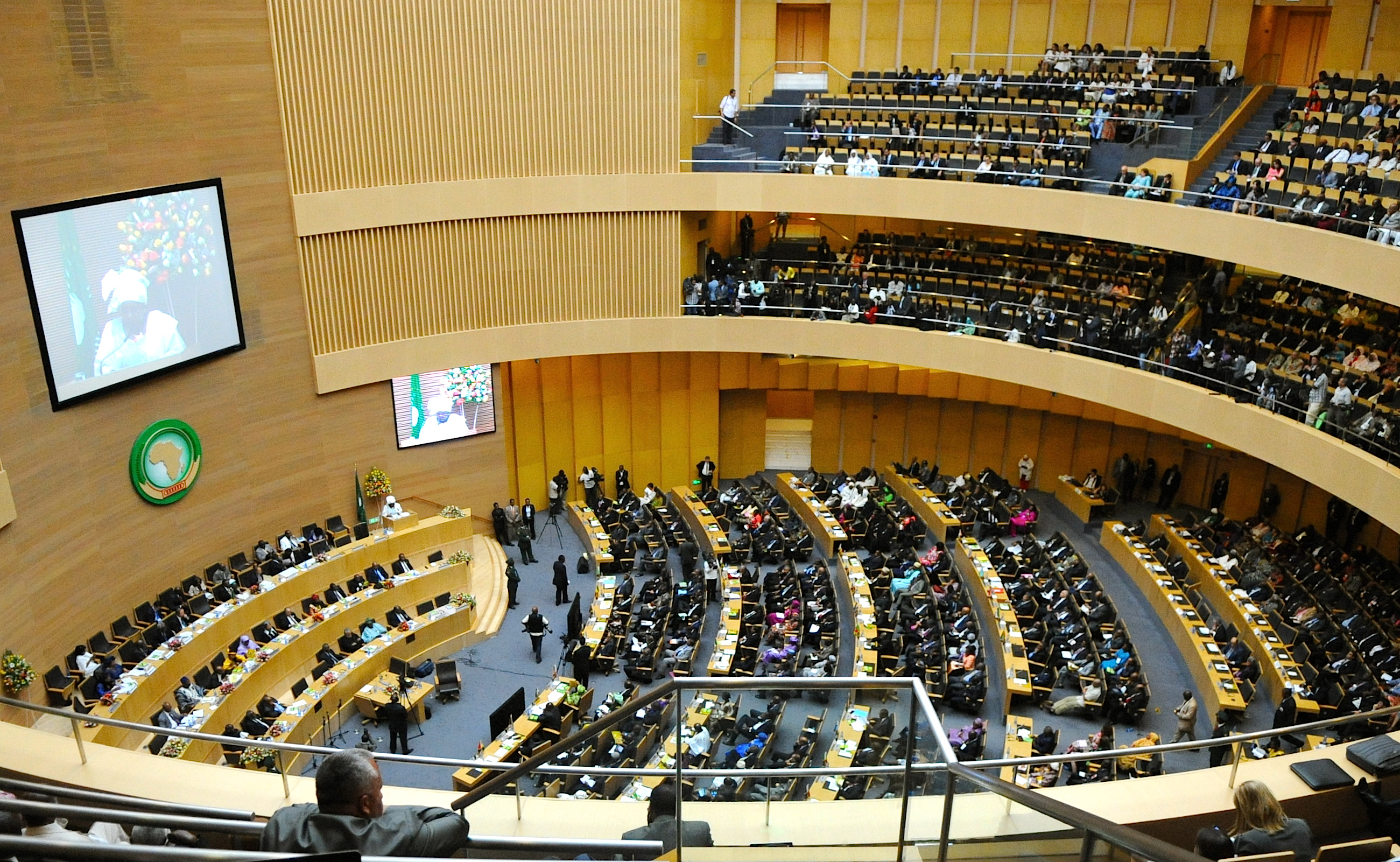
50th anniversary African Union Summit in Addis Ababa, Ethiopia, 25 May 2013

The Assembly shall take its decisions by consensus or, failing which, by a two-thirds majority of the Member States of the Union. However, procedural matters, including the question of whether a matter is one of procedure or not, shall be decided by a simple majority.

Two-thirds of the total membership of the Union shall form a quorum at any meeting of the Assembly.

The Assembly may delegate any of its powers and functions to any organ of the Union.

== Members ==
The AU Assembly of the Heads of State and Government consists of the 55 heads of state and government of the member countries. The Assembly meets once a year at the AU Summit. The current Chairman of the Assembly is President Moussa Faki of Chad.

The current members of the AU-AHSG are:

Member State	Representative	Title	Member since	Photo
Algeria	Abdelmadjid Tebboune	President	19 December 2019	
Angola	João Lourenço	President	26 September 2017	
Benin	Patrice Talon	President	6 April 2016	
Botswana	Duma Boko	President	1 November 2024	
Burkina Faso	Vacant	Membership suspended	31 January 2022	
Burundi	Évariste Ndayishimiye	President	18 June 2020	
Cabo Verde	José Maria Neves	President	9 November 2021	
Cameroon	Paul Biya	President	6 November 1982	
Central African Republic	Faustin-Archange Touadéra	President	30 February 2016	
Chad	Mahamat Déby Itno	President	20 April 2021	
Comoros	Azali Assoumani	President	26 May 2016	
Democratic Republic of the Congo	Félix Tshisekedi	President	24 January 2019	
Republic of the Congo	Denis Sassou Nguesso	President	25 August 1997	
Côte d'Ivoire	Alassane Ouattara	President	4 December 2010	
Djibouti	Ismail Omar Guelleh	President	8 May 1999	
Egypt	Abdel Fattah el-Sisi	President	8 June 2014	
Equatorial Guinea	Teodoro Obiang Nguema Mbasogo	President	3 August 1979	
Eritrea	Isaias Afwerki	President	24 May 1993	
Eswatini	Mswati III	King	25 April 1986	
Ethiopia	Abiy Ahmed	Prime Minister	2 April 2018	
Gabon	Brice Oligui Nguema	President	30 April 2025	
The Gambia	Adama Barrow	President	19 January 2017	
Ghana	John Mahama	President	7 January 2025	
Guinea	Vacant	Membership suspended	10 September 2021	
Guinea-Bissau	Umaro Sissoco Embaló	President	27 February 2020	
Kenya	William Ruto	President	13 September 2022	
Lesotho	Sam Matekane	Prime Minister	28 October 2022	
Liberia	Joseph Boakai	President	22 January 2024	
Libya	Mohamed al-Menfi	Chairman of the Presidential Council	15 March 2021	
Madagascar	Vacant	Membership suspended	15 October 2025	
Malawi	Peter Mutharika	President	4 October 2025	
Mali	Vacant	Membership suspended	2 June 2021	
Mauritania	Mohamed Ould Ghazouani	President	1 August 2019	
Mauritius	Navin Ramgoolam	Prime Minister	13 November 2024	
Morocco	Mohammed VI	King	31 January 2017	
Mozambique	Daniel Chapo	President	15 January 2025	
Namibia	Netumbo Nandi-Ndaitwah	President	21 March 2025	
Niger	Vacant	Membership suspended	26 July 2023	
Nigeria	Bola Tinubu	President	29 May 2023	
Rwanda	Paul Kagame	President	24 March 2000	
Sahrawi Republic	Brahim Ghali	President	12 July 2016	
São Tomé and Príncipe	Carlos Vila Nova	President	2 October 2021	
Senegal	Bassirou Diomaye Faye	President	2 April 2024	
Seychelles	Wavel Ramkalawan	President	26 October 2020	
Sierra Leone	Julius Maada Bio	President	4 April 2018	
Somalia	Hassan Sheikh Mohamud	President	23 May 2022	
South Africa	Cyril Ramaphosa	President	15 February 2018	
South Sudan	Salva Kiir	President	9 July 2011	
Sudan	Vacant	Membership suspended	26 October 2021	
Tanzania	Samia Suluhu Hassan	President	19 March 2021	
Togo	Faure Gnassingbé	President	4 May 2005	
Tunisia	Kais Saied	President	23 October 2019	
Uganda	Yoweri Museveni	President	26 January 1986	
Zambia	Hakainde Hichilema	President	21 August 2021	
Zimbabwe	Emmerson Mnangagwa	President	24 November 2017	

== See also ==
- European Council, the European Union equivalent.
