= Regions of the African Union =

Regions of the African Union: Northern Western Southern Eastern Central

The member states of the African Union (AU) are divided into five geographical regions.

When a principal organ of the United Nations allocates a certain number of seats to the African Group, such as on the UN Security Council or the United Nations Economic and Social Council (ECOSOC), the African Union distributes these seats based on these geographical regions (however, even though Morocco was not a member of the African Union between 1984 and 2017, it was still eligible to be picked). States must apply to the Executive Council's Committee on Candidatures by March of the election year in order to become a candidate. The Committee allocates seats roughly by proportion (for example, the Western Africa subregion usually gets the largest number of seats).

== List ==
List of AU member states by alphabetical order:

=== Northern ===
Member state	Capital	Population	Area (km^{2})
Algeria	Algiers	43,088,000	2,381,740
Egypt	Cairo	99,211,000	1,001,451
Libya	Tripoli	6,578,000	1,759,540
Mauritania	Nouakchott	3,516,806	1,030,700
Morocco	Rabat	35,587,000	446,550
Sahrawi Arab Democratic Republic		267,405	266,000
Tunisia	Tunis	11,800,000	163,610
Total		200,048,211	7,049,591

=== Southern ===
Member state	Capital(s)	Population	Area (km^{2})
Angola	Luanda	30,053,000	1,246,700
Botswana	Gaborone	2,378,000	581,726
Eswatini	Mbabane	1,177,000	17,364
Lesotho	Maseru	2,048,000	30,355
Malawi	Lilongwe	20,289,000	118,484
Mozambique	Maputo	31,157,000	801,590
Namibia	Windhoek	2,408,000	824,116
South Africa	Pretoria; Cape Town; Bloemfontein	58,333,000	1,221,037
Zambia	Lusaka	18,321,000	752,618
Zimbabwe	Harare	15,658,000	390,757
Total		181,822,000	5,984,747

=== Eastern ===
Member state	Capital	Population	Area (km^{2})
Comoros	Moroni	872,000	2,235
Djibouti	Djibouti	1,078,000	23,200
Eritrea	Asmara	6,159,000	117,600
Ethiopia	Addis Ababa	96,633,458	1,104,300
Kenya	Nairobi	50,000,000	580,367
Madagascar	Antananarivo	27,055,000	587,041
Mauritius	Port Louis	1,279,000	2,040
Rwanda	Kigali	12,432,000	26,798
Seychelles	Victoria	96,000	451
Somalia	Mogadishu	11,998,222	637,661
South Sudan	Juba	13,400,000	619,745
Sudan	Khartoum	43,222,000	1,886,068
Tanzania	Dodoma	52,067,000	945,087
Uganda	Kampala	40,007,000	236,040
Total		356,298,680	6,768,633

=== Western ===
Member state	Capital	Population	Area (km^{2})
Benin	Porto-Novo	11,722,000	112,622
Burkina Faso	Ouagadougou	20,000,000	274,000
Cabo Verde	Praia	551,000	4,033
Côte d'Ivoire	Yamoussoukro	26,275,000	322,462
Gambia	Banjul	2,238,000	10,380
Ghana	Accra	29,742,000	238,534
Guinea-Bissau	Bissau	1,776,000	36,125
Guinea	Conakry	13,627,000	245,857
Liberia	Monrovia	5,000,000	111,369
Mali	Bamako	20,161,000	1,240,192
Niger	Niamey	20,000,000	1,267,000
Nigeria	Abuja	199,206,000	923,768
Senegal	Dakar	16,793,000	196,723
Sierra Leone	Freetown	7,737,000	71,740
Togo	Lomé	8,205,000	56,785
Total		383,033,000	5,111,590

=== Central ===
Member state	Capital	Population	Area (km^{2})
Burundi	Gitega	11,529,000	27,834
Cameroon	Yaounde	25,506,000	475,442
Central African Republic	Bangui	5,181,000	622,984
Chad	N'Djamena	12,802,000	1,284,000
Congo Republic	Brazzaville	4,500,000	342,000
DR Congo	Kinshasa	91,931,000	2,345,409
Equatorial Guinea	Ciudad de la Paz	887,000	28,051
Gabon	Libreville	2,080,000	267,667
São Tomé and Príncipe	São Tomé	222,000	964
Total		154,638,000	5,394,351

=== Sixth region of Africa (Diaspora) ===
In the Constitutive Act of the African Union, under the proposed amendment to Article 3(q) of the Act (Objectives), the following is stated regarding the African diaspora: “invite and encourage the full participation of the African Diaspora as an important part of our continent, in building the African Union.” Additionally, the African Union provides definition for its concept of the African diaspora as the following: “The African Diaspora consists of peoples of native or partial African origin living outside the continent, irrespective of their citizenship and nationality and who are willing to contribute to the development of the continent and the building of the African Union.”

In 2016, the African Union denied membership to Haiti due to membership admission, as per Article 29.1 of the Constitutive Act of the African Union, being limited to any “African State.”

In the African Union Handbook (2021), persons who have been appointed to represent the African diaspora at the Assembly of the African Union have been granted the status of observer. More specifically, the African Union Handbook (2021) states:

In January 2008, the Executive Council suggested that the African diaspora be treated as Africa’s sixth region and its participation in the AU’s organs and activities be strengthened (EX.CL/Dec.406(XII)). The Assembly has recognised the diaspora as a substantive entity contributing to the economic and social development of the continent and has invited its representatives as observers to Assembly sessions (see Assembly/AU/Res.1(XVIII) of January 2012).

The African Union has also established regional institutions, such as the Western Hemisphere African Diaspora Network, and international institutions, such as the Economic, Social and Cultural Council, to facilitate African diaspora relations.

Additionally, the African Union works together with AfricaRecruit, the Caribbean Community and Common Market, the Commonwealth Business Council, the International Organization for Migration, and the World Bank to facilitate African diaspora relations, regionally and internationally. Furthermore, individual countries (e.g., Ghana, Ethiopia, Nigeria, South Africa) in Africa have also undertaken national efforts to facilitate African diaspora relations, internationally.

== Changes ==
When the Organisation of African Unity (the African Union's predecessor) was originally created in 1963, Southern Africa was not yet independent and member states were grouped into four regions. As states in Southern Africa gained independence and became members, they joined the Eastern Africa group (including Zambia, Botswana, and Lesotho; but excluding Angola which joined the Central Africa group).

A decision in 1976, implemented by 1979, created the Southern Africa group. The six southern members which had joined Eastern Africa re-grouped, but Angola remained part of Central Africa.

A document from 1975 puts Rwanda in the Eastern Africa group, while a document from 1976 puts Rwanda in the Central Africa group.

Sometime between 1979 and 1980, Sudan changed from the Northern Africa group to the Eastern Africa group. (Note: In 1972-1973, Sudan sat in the Northern Africa seat on the United Nations Security Council. A document from 1975 puts Sudan in the Northern Africa group. In an apparent contradiction, a document from 1976 mentions Sudan changing from the Eastern Africa group to the Northern Africa group. Documents from 1977, 1978, and 1979 put Sudan in the Northern Africa group. A document from 1980 puts Sudan in the Eastern Africa group.)

In 1995, Angola changed from the Central Africa group to the Southern Africa group.

Sometime between 2000 and 2003, Rwanda changed from the Central Africa group back to the Eastern Africa group. (Note: A document from 1999 puts Rwanda in the Central Africa group, while a document from 2004 puts Rwanda in the Eastern Africa group.)

In 2004, Mauritania changed from the Western Africa group to the Northern Africa group.

== See also ==
- List of regions of Africa
- United Nations geoscheme for Africa
