= Assembly of the Autonomous Island of Mohéli =

The Assembly of the Autonomous Island of Mohéli is the island's legislative body. The Assembly, formed following elections held on 2004, has a total of 10 members.

== Elections ==
=== 2004 ===
Supporters of the Island President, Mohamed Said Fazul, won 9 seats while one seat was won by a supporter of Union President Azali Assoumani.

== See also ==
- Assembly of the Union of the Comoros
- Assemblies of the Autonomous Islands of the Comoros
  - Assembly of the Autonomous Island of Anjouan
  - Assembly of the Autonomous Island of Grande Comore
