= Assembly of the Autonomous Island of Anjouan =

The Assembly of the Autonomous Island of Anjouan is the island's legislative body. It is composed of 25 deputies.

== Elections ==
=== 2004 ===
The Assembly, formed following elections held on 14 and 21 March 2004, has a total of 25 members. Supporters of the Island President, Mohamed Bacar, won 20 seats while supporters of Union President Azali Assoumani won 5.

== See also ==
- Assembly of the Union of the Comoros
- Assemblies of the Autonomous Islands of the Comoros
  - Assembly of the Autonomous Island of Grande Comore
  - Assembly of the Autonomous Island of Mohéli
