= Assemblies of the Autonomous Islands of the Comoros =

In March and April 2002, the three islands of the Comoros (Anjouan, Grande Comore, and Mohéli) held and approved new constitutions in referendums. The main points of the constitutions were to establish each island as an autonomous part of the Union of Comoros, along with provisions that created elected local assemblies and presidents.

- Assembly of the Autonomous Island of Anjouan – 25 members
- Assembly of the Autonomous Island of Mohéli – 10 members
- Assembly of the Autonomous Island of Grande Comore – 20 members

The island of Mayotte is administered by the French government.

== See also ==
- History of Comoros
- Assembly of the Union of the Comoros
