= Assembly of the Autonomous Island of Grande Comore =

The Assembly of the Autonomous Island of Grande Comore is the island's legislative body. It is formed by 20 members, elected by 20 different "circonscriptions électorales".

== Elections ==
=== 2004 ===
The Assembly, formed following elections held on 14 and 21 March 2004, had a total of 20 members. Supporters of the Island President, Abdou Soulé Elbak, won 14 seats while supporters of Union President Azali Assoumani won 6.

=== 2020 ===
The Assembly had a total of 24 seats. The Presidential Movement Alliance, a coalition including various supporters of President Azali Assoumani, won all seats. The opposition coalition boycotted the 2020 election.

=== 2025 ===
Parliamentary elections were held on 12 January 2025, with a second round on 16 February 2025. The Parliament of Comoros consists of two chambers: the Assembly of the Union and the Assembly of each island. The main opposition party, Juwa, boycotted the elections, claiming a lack of transparency in the electoral process.

== See also ==
- Assembly of the Union of the Comoros
- Assemblies of the Autonomous Islands of the Comoros
  - Assembly of the Autonomous Island of Anjouan
  - Assembly of the Autonomous Island of Mohéli
