= Enlargement of the African Union =

Accession of new countries to the AU

When the African Union (AU) was founded in 2002, it represented almost the entire African continent, inheriting the membership of the Organisation of African Unity (OAU), which was founded in 1963, as its successor. Currently, the AU has 55 member states. Growth in the OAU typically came from post-colonial independence; as decolonisation ended, the borders of the OAU had overlapped almost all of Africa.

== Membership ==
Article 29 of the Constitutive Act of the African Union (ratified July 11, 2000), states:

1. Any African State may, at any time after the entry into force of this Act, notify the Chairman of the Commission of its intention to accede to this Act and to be admitted as a member of the Union.
2. The Chairman of the Commission shall, upon receipt of such notification, transmit copies thereof to all Member States. Admission shall be decided by a simple majority of the Member States. The decision of each Member State shall be transmitted to the Chairman of the Commission who shall, upon receipt of the required number of votes, communicate the decision to the State concerned.

The following two articles discuss the suspension and cessation of membership:

Governments which shall come to power through unconstitutional means shall not be allowed to participate in the activities of the Union.

and

1. Any State which desires to renounce its membership shall forward a written notification to the Chairman of the Commission, who shall inform Member States thereof. At the end of one year from the date of such notification, if not withdrawn, the Act shall cease to apply with respect to the renouncing State, which shall thereby cease to belong to the Union.
2. During the period of one year referred to in paragraph 1 of this Article, any Member State wishing to withdraw from the Union shall comply with the provisions of this Act and shall be bound to discharge its obligations under this Act up to the date of its withdrawal.

The former of these two clauses has been used to suspend the participation of states in the AU a number of times. The only state to leave the OAU was Morocco, which withdrew in 1984 following the admission of the Sahrawi Arab Democratic Republic in 1982. It rejoined the AU in 2017.

== Current members ==
Between 1984 and 2017, Morocco was the only UN Member state in Africa which was not a member of the AU, following its withdrawal from the OAU in 1984. Many leaders of African nations supported the reintegration of Morocco to the AU. In July 2016, Morocco announced that it wished to rejoin the organisation. Morocco's membership was approved by the AU on 30 January 2017.

== Possible growth ==
It’s not something we decided, it’s a place that we earned after we fought for our independence 212 years ago... We paved the way for every other African nation to be free today, so historically speaking Haiti should have been in the AU already.—Haitian High Commissioner to South Africa Jacques Junior Baril, 2016.

In February 2012, the Caribbean Republic of Haiti signalled that it would seek to upgrade its observer status to associate member status. The AU had planned at its summit in June 2013 to upgrade Haiti's status from observer to associate. In a press release issued May 2016, the African Union Commission announced, "According to Article 29.1 of the AU's Constitutive Act, only African States can join the African Union." Therefore, "Haiti will not be admitted as a Member State of the African Union."

Although the AU includes one largely-unrecognised state, the Sahrawi Arab Democratic Republic, the prospects of the unrecognised African state of Somaliland being admitted to the organisation are slim. The AU continues to recognise the territorial integrity of Somalia and favours the Transitional Federal Government's claim that Somaliland is an autonomous region over the Somaliland government's assertion of full sovereignty. Nonetheless, Somaliland applied for AU membership in 2005, a request that has hereto gone unanswered.

After Azawad's unilateral declaration of independence from Mali in 2012, the AU issued a statement calling the pronouncement "null and of no value whatsoever."

The only parts of continental Africa or outlying islands not represented by the AU are dependencies and other small territories of France (Mayotte, Réunion, and the Scattered Islands in the Indian Ocean), Italy (Pantelleria and the Pelagian Islands), Portugal (Madeira Islands), Spain (Canary Islands, Ceuta, Melilla, and the plazas de soberanía), the United Kingdom (Saint Helena, Ascension and Tristan da Cunha, Chagos Archipelago), and Yemen (Socotra). Spain's Ceuta and Melilla are the only territories on continental Africa not represented by an AU member state.

Israeli Prime Minister Benjamin Netanyahu requested in 2017 to join the African Union as an observer, with the bid supported by Ghana.

== See also ==
- Enlargement of the European Union – Accession of new countries to the EU
- Foreign relations of the African Union
- List of African Union member states by political system
