= Organs of the African Union =

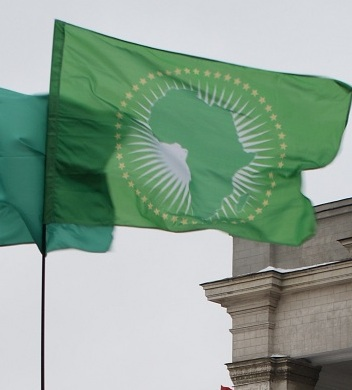
The AU Flag

The African Union is governed by organs per Article 5 of the Constitutive Act of the African Union.

== List ==
=== Assembly of the union ===
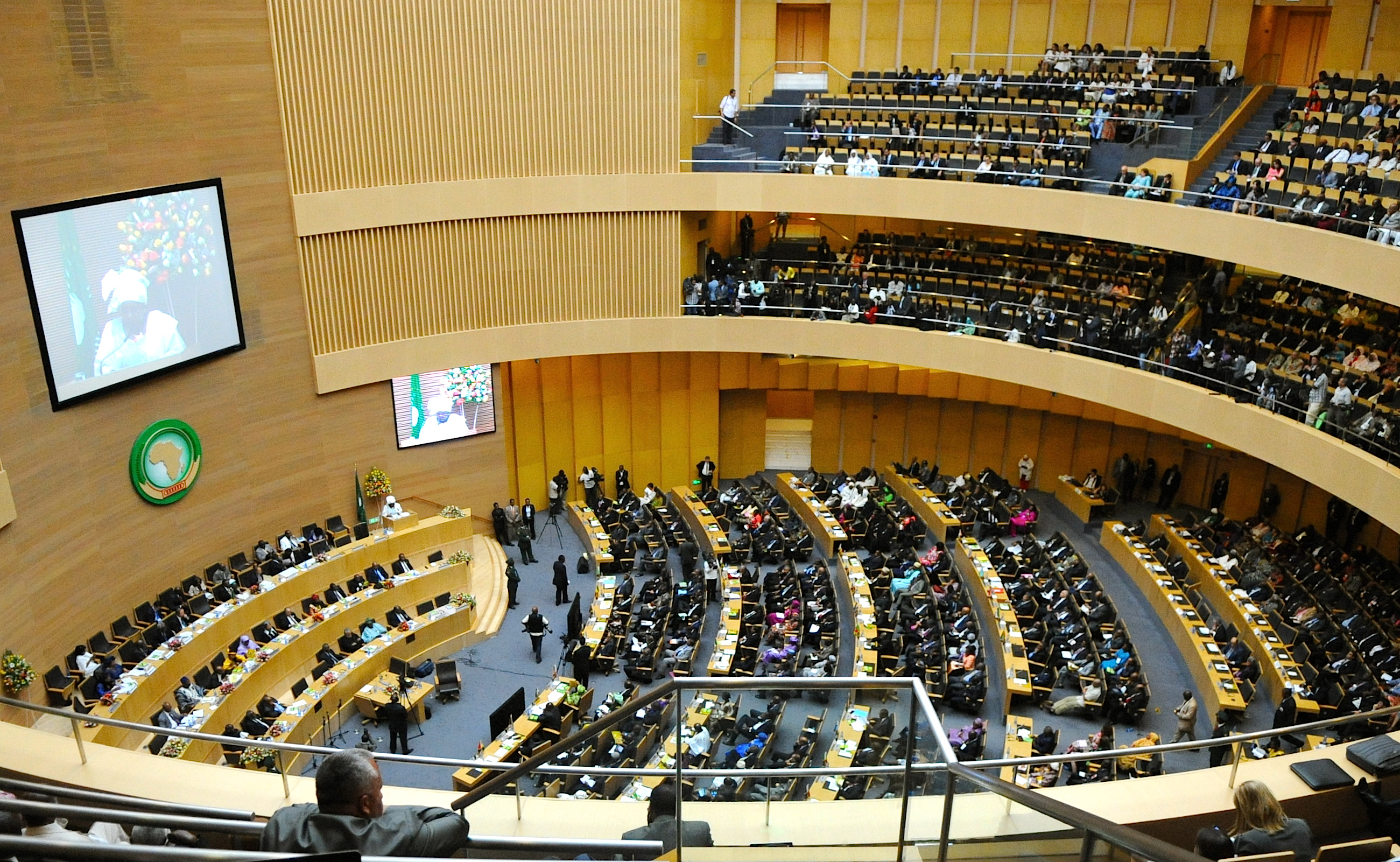
Assembly in session

=== Pan-African Parliament ===
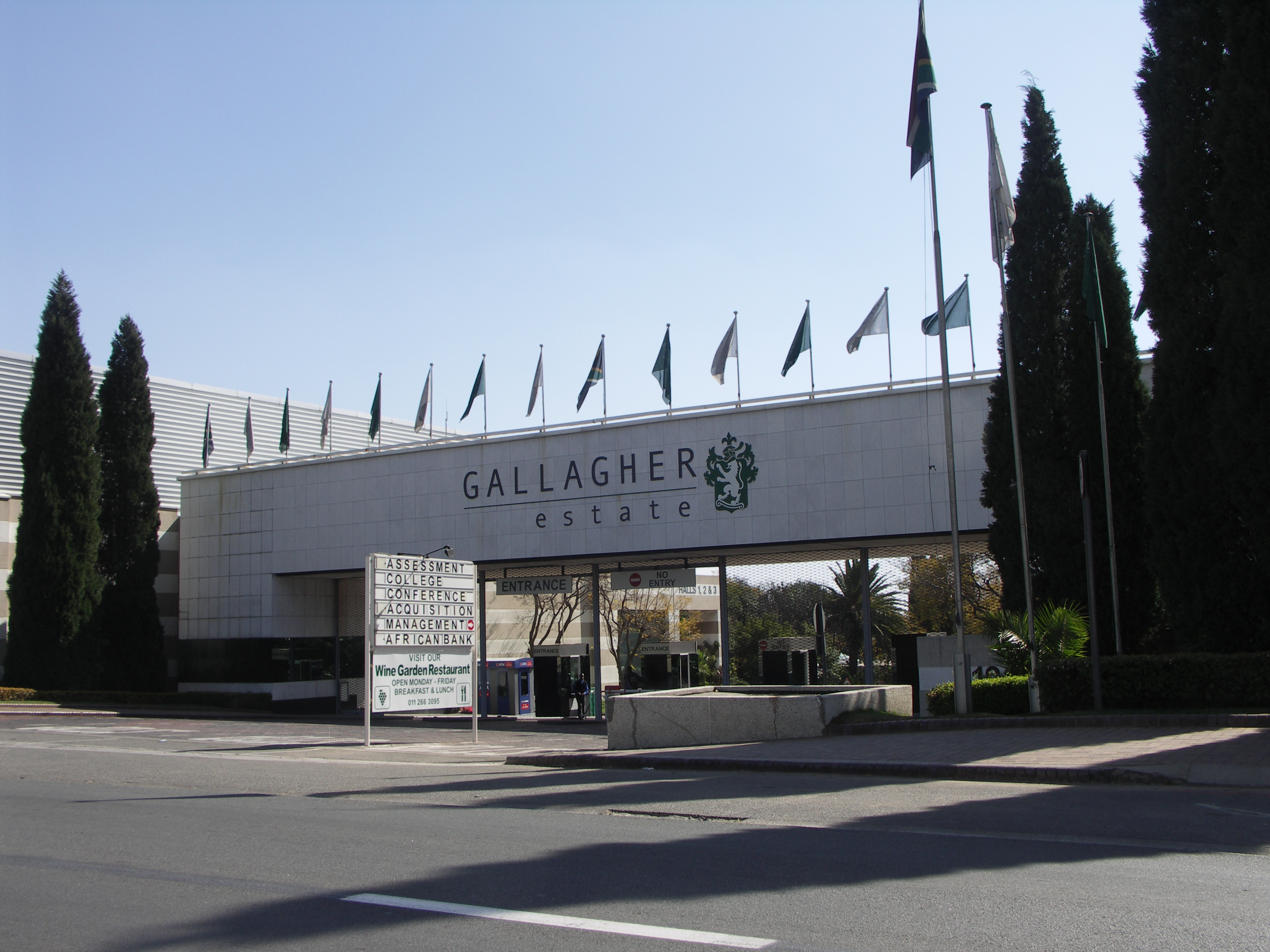
Gallagher Estate in Midrand, South Africa

=== Peace and Security Council ===
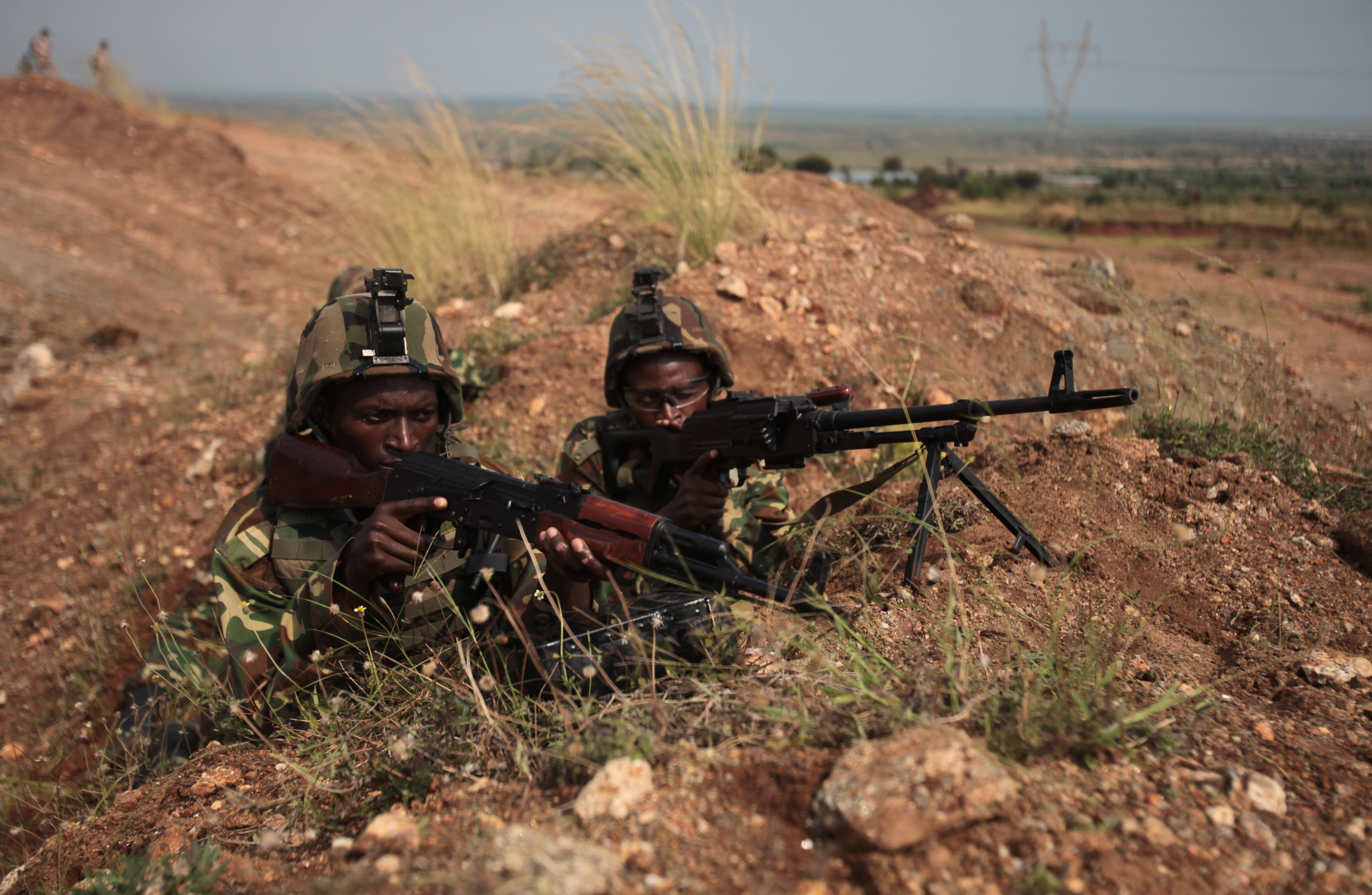
Burundian soldiers training prior to their deployment to serve in Somalia
