= African Union =

Continental union of African states

(in other official languages)
Arabic	الاتحاد الأفريقي
Spanish	Unión Africana
French	Union africaine
Portuguese	União Africana
Swahili	Umoja wa Afrika
- Flag Emblem
- Motto: "A United and Strong Africa"
- Anthem: "African Union Anthem"
- Member states Suspended states
- Political centres: Addis Ababa (Note: Seat of the African Union Commission); Johannesburg (Note: Seat of the Pan-African Parliament)
- Largest urban agglomerations: Cairo; Lagos
- Official languages: Arabic; English; French; Portuguese; Spanish; Swahili; other languages of Africa
- Demonym: African
- Type: Continental union
- Membership: 55 member states: Algeria; Angola; Benin; Botswana; Burundi; Cameroon; Cabo Verde; Central African Republic; Chad; Comoros; Democratic Republic of the Congo; Republic of the Congo; Djibouti; Egypt; Equatorial Guinea; Eritrea; Eswatini; Ethiopia; Gabon; Gambia; Ghana; Guinea; Côte d'Ivoire; Kenya; Lesotho; Liberia; Libya; Malawi; Mauritania; Mauritius; Morocco; Mozambique; Namibia; Nigeria; Rwanda; Sahrawi Arab Democratic Republic; São Tomé and Príncipe; Senegal; Seychelles; Sierra Leone; Somalia; South Africa; South Sudan; Tanzania; Togo; Tunisia; Uganda; Zambia; Zimbabwe; Suspended members: Burkina Faso; Guinea-Bissau; Madagascar; Mali; Niger; Sudan; 9 observer states: Haiti; Kazakhstan; Latvia; Mexico; Palestine; Serbia; Turkey; Ukraine; United Arab Emirates

Leaders
  - Chairperson: (Burundi) Évariste Ndayishimiye
  - Commission Chairperson: (Djibouti) Mahamoud Ali Youssouf
  - Parliamentary President: (Algeria) Fateh Boutbig
- Legislature: Pan-African Parliament

Establishment
  - OAU Charter: 25 May 1963
  - Abuja Treaty: 3 June 1991
  - Sirte Declaration: 9 September 1999
  - African Union founded: 9 July 2002
  - Admission of South Sudan: 9 July 2011
  - Admission of Morocco: 31 January 2017
  - African Continental Free Trade Area (AfCFTA): 1 January 2021

Area
  - Total: 29,922,059 km^{2} (11,552,972 sq mi) (2)

Population
  - 2025 estimate: ▲1,549,867,579
  - Density: 51.8/km^{2} (134.2/sq mi)
- GDP (PPP): 2026 estimate
  - Total: ▲$12.52 trillion (Note: Excluding Western Sahara due to lack of data)
  - Per capita: ▲$8,330
- GDP (nominal): 2026 estimate
  - Total: ▲$3.56 trillion
  - Per capita: ▲$2,370
- HDI (2020): 0.577 medium
- Internet TLD: .africa
- Website au.int

The African Union (AU) is a continental union of 55 member states located on the continent of Africa. The AU was announced in the Sirte Declaration in Sirte, Libya, on 9 September 1999, calling for the establishment of the African Union. The bloc was launched on 9 July 2002 in Durban, South Africa. The intention of the AU was to replace the Organisation of African Unity (OAU), established on 25 May 1963 in Addis Ababa by 32 signatory governments; the OAU was disbanded on 9 July 2002. The most important decisions of the AU are made by the Assembly of the African Union, a semi-annual meeting of the heads of state and government of its member states. The African economy is regionally integrated through this union.

The AU's secretariat, the African Union Commission, is based in Addis Ababa. The largest city in the AU is Lagos, Nigeria, while the largest urban agglomeration is Cairo, in Egypt. The African Union has more than 1.5 billion people and an area of around 30 million km^{2} (12 million sq mi) and includes world landmarks such as the Sahara and the Nile. The primary working languages are Arabic, English, French, Portuguese, Spanish, and Swahili. Within the African Union, there are official bodies, such as the Peace and Security Council and the Pan-African Parliament. The AU is a member of the G20.

== Overview ==
The objectives of the African Union are:

1. To achieve greater unity, cohesion and solidarity among the African countries and African nations.
2. To defend the sovereignty, territorial integrity and independence of its Member States.
3. To accelerate the political and social-economic integration of the continent.
4. To promote and defend African common positions on issues of interest to the continent and its peoples.
5. To encourage international cooperation, taking due account of the Charter of the United Nations and the Universal Declaration of Human Rights.
6. To promote peace, security, and stability on the continent.
7. To promote democratic principles and institutions, popular participation and good governance.
8. To promote and protect human and peoples' rights in accordance with the African Charter on Human and Peoples' Rights and other relevant human rights instruments.
9. To establish the necessary conditions which enable the continent to play its rightful role in the global economy and in international negotiations.
10. To promote sustainable development at the economic, social and cultural levels as well as the integration of African economies.
11. To promote co-operation in all fields of human activity to raise the living standards of African people.
12. To coordinate and harmonise the policies between the existing and future Regional Economic Communities for the gradual attainment of the objectives of the Union.
13. To advance the development of the continent by promoting research in all fields, in particular in science and technology.
14. To work with relevant international partners in the eradication of preventable diseases and the promotion of good health on the continent.

The African Union is made up of both political and administrative bodies. The highest decision-making organ is the Assembly of the African Union, made up of all the heads of state or government of member states of the AU. The Assembly is chaired by Évariste Ndayishimiye, President of Burundi. The AU also has a representative body, the Pan-African Parliament, which consists of 265 members elected by the national legislatures of the AU member states. Its president is Fortune Z. Charumbira.

Other political institutions of the AU include:

- the Executive Council, made up of foreign ministers, which prepares decisions for the Assembly;
- the Permanent Representatives Committee, made up of the ambassadors to Addis Ababa of AU member states; and
- the Economic, Social, and Cultural Council (ECOSOCC), a civil society consultative body.

The AU Commission, the secretariat to the political structures, is chaired by Mahamoud Ali Youssouf of Djibouti.

Other AU structures are hosted by different member states:

- the African Commission on Human and Peoples' Rights is based in Banjul, the Gambia; and
- the New Partnership for Africa's Development (NEPAD) and APRM Secretariats and the Pan-African Parliament are in Midrand, South Africa.

The AU's first military intervention in a member state was the May 2003 deployment of a peacekeeping force of soldiers from South Africa, Ethiopia, and Mozambique to oversee the implementation of the various agreements in Burundi. AU troops were also deployed in Sudan for peacekeeping during the Darfur Conflict, before the mission was handed over to the United Nations on 1 January 2008 via UNAMID. The AU has a peacekeeping mission in Somalia, consisting of troops from Uganda and Burundi.

The AU has adopted a number of important new documents establishing norms at the continental level, to supplement those already in force when it was created. These include the African Union Convention on Preventing and Combating Corruption (2003), the African Charter on Democracy, Elections and Governance (2007), the New Partnership for Africa's Development (NEPAD) and its associated Declaration on Democracy, Political, Economic and Corporate Governance.

== History ==
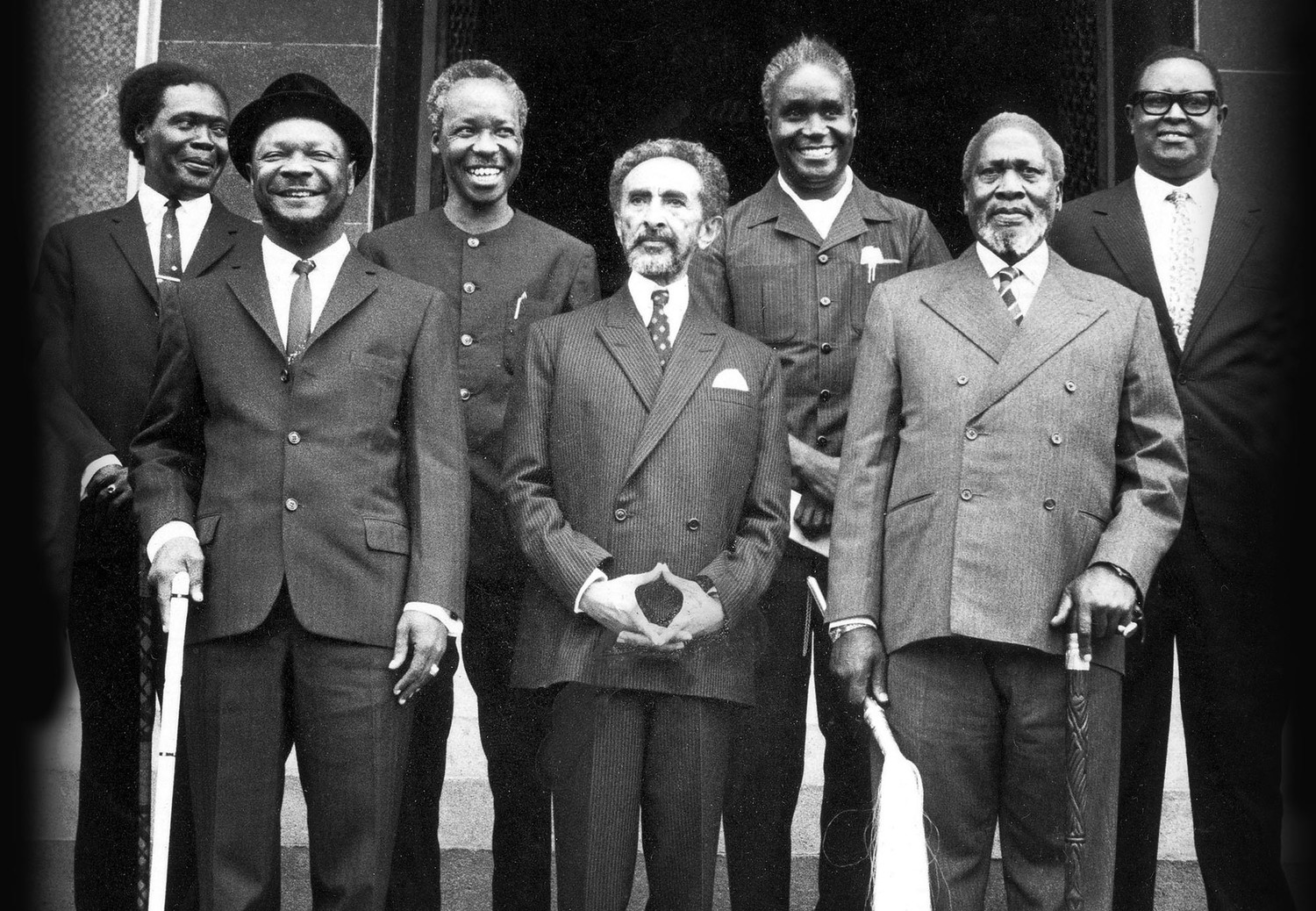
African leaders who founded the OAU the predecessor of the African Union, Emperor Haile Selassie I (center), President Kenyatta (right) and other African leaders including Presidents Obote (behind, left side) and Nyerere (behind, center left)

The historical foundations of the African Union originated in the First Congress of Independent African States, held in Accra, Ghana from 15 to 22 April 1958. The conference was aimed at establishing Africa Day to annually mark the liberation movement concerning the willingness of the African people to free themselves from colonial rule, as well as subsequent attempts to unite Africa, including the Organisation of African Unity (OAU), which was established on 25 May 1963, and the African Economic Community in 1991. Critics argued that the OAU in particular did little to protect the rights and liberties of African citizens from their own political leaders, often dubbing it the "Dictators' Club".

The idea of creating the AU was revived in the mid-1990s under the leadership of Libyan head of state Muammar al-Gaddafi; the heads of state and governments of the OAU issued the Sirte Declaration (named after Sirte, Libya) on 9 September 1999, calling for the establishment of an African Union. The Declaration was followed by summits at Lomé in 2000, when the Constitutive Act of the African Union was adopted, and at Lusaka in 2001, when the plan for the implementation of the African Union was adopted. During the same period, the initiative for the establishment of the New Partnership for Africa's Development (NEPAD) was also established.

The African Union was launched in Durban on 9 July 2002 by its first chairperson, former South African head of state Thabo Mbeki, at the first session of the Assembly of the African Union. The second session of the Assembly was held in Maputo in 2003 and the third session in Addis Ababa was held on 6 July 2004.

Since 2010, the African Union eyes the establishment of a joint African space agency.

Barack Obama was the first-ever sitting United States president to speak in front of the African Union in Addis Ababa on 29 July 2015. During his speech, he encouraged the world to increase economic ties via investments and trade with the continent and lauded the signs of progress made in education, infrastructure and economy. However, he also criticized a lack of democracy and leaders who refuse to step down, discrimination against minorities (including LGBT people, religious groups and ethnicities) and corruption. He suggested an intensified democratization and free trade to significantly increase living quality for Africans.

=== Treaties ===
Signed
In force
Document
1961
1962
1963
1965
OAU Charter
1991
N/A
Abuja Treaty
1999
2002
Sirte Declaration

Organisation of African Unity (OAU)
African Economic Community: (AEC)

Community of Sahel–Saharan States (CEN-SAD)

Common Market for Eastern and Southern Africa (COMESA)

East African Community (EAC)

Economic Community of Central African States (ECCAS)

Economic Community of West African States (ECOWAS)

Intergovernmental Authority on Development (IGAD)

Southern African Development Community (SADC)

Arab Maghreb Union (AMU)

Casablanca Group

African Union (AU)
Monrovia Group

== Politics ==
The African Union has a number of official bodies:

Pan-African Parliament (PAP)
To become the highest legislative body of the African Union. The seat of the PAP is at Midrand, Johannesburg, South Africa. The Parliament is composed of 265 elected representatives from all 55 AU states, and intended to provide popular and civil-society participation in the processes of democratic governance. Its president is Fateh Boutbig, of Algeria.
Assembly of the African Union
Composed of heads of state and heads of government of AU states, the Assembly is currently the supreme governing body of the African Union. It is gradually devolving some of its decision-making powers to the Pan-African Parliament. It meets once a year and makes its decisions by consensus or by a two-thirds majority. The current chair of the AU since February 2026 is President Évariste Ndayishimiye, President of Burundi.
African Union Commission (or Authority)
The secretariat of the African Union, composed of ten commissioners and supporting staff and headquartered in Addis Ababa, Ethiopia. In a similar fashion to its European counterpart, the European Commission, it is responsible for the administration and coordination of the AU's activities and meetings.
Court of Justice of the African Union
The Constitutive Act provides for a Court of Justice to rule on disputes over interpretation of AU treaties. A protocol to set up this Court of Justice was adopted in 2003 and entered into force in 2009. It was, however, superseded by a protocol creating an African Court of Justice and Human Rights, which will incorporate the already established African Court on Human and Peoples' Rights (see below) and have two chambers: one for general legal matters and one for rulings on the human rights treaties.
Executive Council
Composed of ministers designated by the governments of member states. It decides on matters such as foreign trade, social security, food, agriculture and communications, is accountable to the Assembly, and prepares material for the Assembly to discuss and approve. It is chaired by Shawn Makuyana of Zimbabwe (2015–).
Permanent Representatives' Committee
Consisting of nominated permanent representatives of member states, the Committee prepares the work for the Executive Council, similar to the role of the Committee of Permanent Representatives in the European Union.
Peace and Security Council (PSC)
Proposed at the 2001 Lusaka Summit and established in 2004 under a protocol to the Constitutive Act adopted by the AU Assembly in July 2002. The protocol defines the PSC as a collective security and early-warning arrangement to facilitate timely and effective response to conflict and crisis situations in Africa. Other responsibilities conferred to the PSC by the protocol include prevention, management and resolution of conflicts, post-conflict peace building and developing common defence policies. The PSC has fifteen members elected on a regional basis by the Assembly. Similar in intent and operation to the United Nations Security Council.
Economic, Social and Cultural Council
An advisory organ composed of professional and civic representatives, similar to the European Economic and Social Committee. The chair of ECOSOCC, elected in 2008, is Cameroonian lawyer Akere Muna of the Pan-African Lawyers Union (PALU).
Specialised Technical Committees
Both the Abuja Treaty and the Constitutive Act provide for Specialised Technical Committees to be established made up of African ministers to advise the Assembly. In practice, they have never been set up. The ten proposed themes are: Rural Economy and Agricultural Matters; Monetary and Financial Affairs; Trade, Customs, and Immigration; Industry, Science and Technology; Energy, Natural Resources, and Environment; Transport, Communications, and Tourism; Health; Labour, and Social Affairs; Education, Culture, and Human Resources.
Financial institutions

- African Central Bank – Abuja, Nigeria
- African Investment Bank – Tripoli, Libya
- African Monetary Fund – Yaoundé, Cameroon

These institutions have not yet been established; however, the Steering Committees working on their founding have been constituted. Eventually, the AU aims to have a single currency (the Afro).

Health
The Africa Centres for Disease Control and Prevention (Africa CDC) was founded in 2016 and launched in 2017. Its headquarters are in Addis Ababa, Ethiopia.
Human rights
The African Commission on Human and Peoples' Rights, in existence since 1986, is established under the African Charter on Human and Peoples' Rights (the African Charter) rather than the Constitutive Act of the African Union. It is the premier African human rights body, with responsibility for monitoring and promoting compliance with the African Charter. The African Court on Human and Peoples' Rights was established in 2006 to supplement the work of the commission, following the entry into force of a protocol to the African Charter providing for its creation. It is planned that the African Court on Human and Peoples' Rights will be merged with the Court of Justice of the African Union (see above).
Space
The African Space Agency was officially formed in 2023. It is headquartered in Cairo.
Energy
The African Energy Commission was founded in 2008, and is based in Algiers.

=== Member states ===
All UN member states in the African continent are members of the African Union. Additionally, the partially recognized state of the Sahrawi Arab Democratic Republic (SADR), which is not a member of the UN, is also a member of the AU. Morocco withdrew from the Organisation of African Unity in 1984 due to the admission as a member state of the SADR, whose territory of Western Sahara it claims sovereignty over. It was readmitted by the AU as a member state on 30 January 2017. Somaliland, which claims independence from Somalia, applied to join the AU in 2005, but has not been accepted.

=== Observer status ===
Non-governmental organizations, non-African countries, regional integration bodies, and international organizations may apply for observer status with the African Union. This status enables them to engage with the Union, strengthen diplomatic ties, and promote cooperation. Observers may attend meetings, follow discussions, share expertise, and support joint initiatives in different areas.

Mexico has held Permanent Observer status at the AU since 2005, with its diplomatic relations with the organization managed by the Mexican Embassy in Ethiopia since the embassy opened in 2007.

Latvia obtained observer status in 2012 and Kazakhstan followed suit in 2013.

=== Suspended members ===
As of 2026, six members are suspended from the AU due to having undergone coups d'état: Mali (since 2021), Sudan (since 2021), Burkina Faso (since 2022), Niger (since 2023), Madagascar (since 2025), and Guinea-Bissau (since 2025).

Mali was suspended from the African Union on 19 August 2020 following a military coup. On 9 October of the same year, the Peace and Security Council of the African Union lifted the suspension imposed on Mali, citing progress made to return to democracy. The country was again suspended on 1 June 2021, following its second military coup within nine months.

Sudan's membership was suspended by the African Union on 27 October 2021, after a military coup deposed the civilian government led by Prime Minister Abdalla Hamdok.

Burkina Faso's membership was suspended by the African Union in the aftermath of a military coup on 31 January 2022.

Niger's membership was suspended by the African Union on 22 August 2023 following a military coup in late July that deposed democratically elected president Mohamed Bazoum; this has since also led to the 2023–2024 Nigerien crisis.

Following the 2025 Malagasy coup d'état, Madagascar's membership was suspended.

Following 2025 Guinea-Bissau coup d'état, Guinea-Bissau's membership was suspended.

=== Formerly suspended members ===
Guinea's membership was also suspended by the African Union on 10 September 2021, after a military coup deposed the country's President Alpha Condé. After almost five years, Guinea was readmitted into the AU in January 2026.

Gabon's membership was suspended by the African Union on 31 August 2023 following a military coup that deposed president Ali Bongo Ondimba. In April 2025, the African Union decided to readmit Gabon.

==== Members ====
- Algeria
- Angola
- Benin
- Botswana
- Burkina Faso (suspended)
- Burundi
- Cameroon
- Cape Verde
- Central African Republic
- Chad
- Comoros
- Democratic Republic of the Congo
- Republic of the Congo
- Djibouti
- Egypt
- Equatorial Guinea
- Eritrea
- Eswatini
- Ethiopia
- Gabon
- Gambia
- Ghana
- Guinea
- Guinea-Bissau (suspended)
- Ivory Coast
- Kenya
- Lesotho
- Liberia
- Libya
- Madagascar (suspended)
- Malawi
- Mali (suspended)
- Mauritania
- Mauritius
- Morocco
- Mozambique
- Namibia
- Niger (suspended)
- Nigeria
- Rwanda
- Sahrawi Republic
- São Tomé and Príncipe
- Senegal
- Seychelles
- Sierra Leone
- Somalia
- South Africa
- South Sudan
- Sudan (suspended)
- Tanzania
- Togo
- Tunisia
- Uganda
- Zambia
- Zimbabwe

==== Observers ====
- Haiti
- Israel (suspended as of February 2023)
- Kazakhstan
- Latvia
- Mexico
- Palestine
- Serbia
- Turkey
- Ukraine
- United Arab Emirates

=== Governance ===
The principal topic for debate at the July 2007 AU summit held in Accra, Ghana, was the creation of a Union Government, with the aim of moving towards a United States of Africa. A study on the Union Government was adopted in late 2006, and proposes various options for "completing" the African Union project. There are divisions among African states on the proposals, with some (notably Libya) following a maximalist view leading to a common government with an AU army; and others (especially the southern African states) supporting rather a strengthening of the existing structures, with some reforms to deal with administrative and political challenges in making the AU Commission and other bodies truly effective.

Following a heated debate in Accra, the Assembly of Heads of State and Government agreed in the form of a declaration to review the state of affairs of the AU with a view to determining its readiness towards a Union Government. In particular, the Assembly agreed to:

- Accelerate the economic and political integration of the African continent, including the formation of a Union Government of Africa;
- Conduct an audit of the institutions and organs of the AU; review the relationship between the AU and the RECs; find ways to strengthen the AU and elaborate a timeframe to establish a Union Government of Africa.

The declaration lastly noted the "importance of involving the African peoples, including Africans in the Diaspora, in the processes leading to the formation of the Union Government".

Following this decision, a panel of eminent persons was set up to conduct the "audit review". The review team began its work on 1 September 2007. The review was presented to the Assembly of Heads of State and Government at the January 2008 summit in Addis Ababa. No final decision was taken on the recommendations, however, and a committee of ten heads of state was appointed to consider the review and report back to the July 2008 summit to be held in Egypt. At the July 2008 summit, a decision was once again deferred, for a "final" debate at the January 2009 summit to be held in Addis Ababa.

In February 2025, Djiboutian diplomat Mahamoud Ali Youssouf was elected Chairperson of the African Union Commission during the African Union summit held in Addis Ababa

==== Role of African Union ====
The image above contains clickable links Euler diagram showing the relationships among various multinational African entities

One of the key debates in relation to the achievement of greater continental integration is the relative priority that should be given to integration of the continent as a unit in itself or to integration of the sub-regions. The 1980 Lagos Plan of Action for the Development of Africa and the 1991 treaty to establish the African Economic Community (also referred to as the Abuja Treaty), proposed the creation of Regional Economic Communities (RECs) as the basis for African integration, with a timetable for regional and then continental integration to follow.

Currently, there are eight RECs recognised by the AU, each established under a separate regional treaty. They are:

- Arab Maghreb Union (AMU)
- Common Market for Eastern and Southern Africa (COMESA)
- Community of Sahel-Saharan States (CEN-SAD)
- East African Community (EAC)
- Economic Community of Central African States (ECCAS)
- Economic Community of West African States (ECOWAS)
- Intergovernmental Authority on Development (IGAD)
- Southern Africa Development Community (SADC)

The membership of many of the communities overlaps, and their rationalisation has been under discussion for several years—and formed the theme of the 2006 Banjul summit. At the July 2007 Accra summit the Assembly finally decided to adopt a Protocol on Relations between the African Union and the Regional Economic Communities. This protocol is intended to facilitate the harmonisation of policies and ensure compliance with the Abuja Treaty and Lagos Plan of Action time frames.

=== Selection of the chairperson ===
In 2006, the AU decided to create a Committee "to consider the implementation of a rotation system between the regions" in relation to the presidency. Controversy arose at the 2006 summit when Sudan announced its candidacy for the AU's chairmanship, as a representative of the East African region. Several member states refused to support Sudan because of tensions over Darfur (see also below). Sudan ultimately withdrew its candidacy and President Denis Sassou-Nguesso of the Republic of the Congo was elected to a one-year term. At the January 2007 summit, Sassou-Nguesso was replaced by President John Agyekum Kufuor of Ghana, despite another attempt by Sudan to gain the chair. The year 2007 was the 50th anniversary of Ghana's independence, a symbolic moment for the country to hold the chair of the AU—and to host the mid-year summit at which the proposed Union Government was also discussed. In January 2008, President Jakaya Kikwete of Tanzania took over as chair, representing the East African region and thus apparently ending Sudan's attempt to become chair—at least till the rotation returned to East Africa. The current chair is Évariste Ndayishimiye, President of Burundi, whose term began on 14 February 2026.

==== List of chairpersons ====
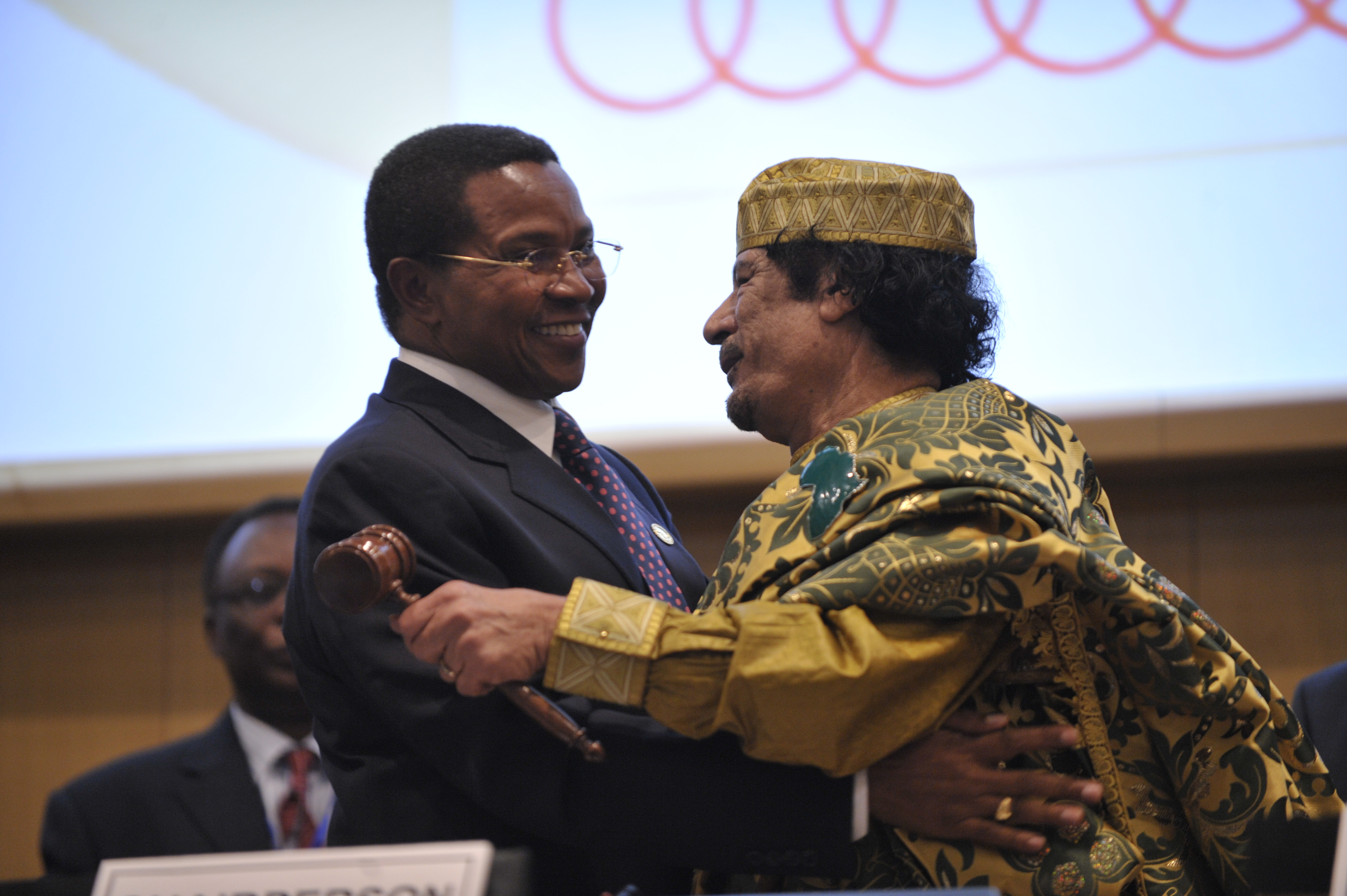
Muammar Gaddafi embracing Tanzanian President Kikwete after assuming the chairmanship

Chairpersons of the African Union
Name	Beginning of term	End of term	Country
Thabo Mbeki	9 July 2002	10 July 2003	South Africa
Joaquim Chissano	10 July 2003	6 July 2004	Mozambique
Olusegun Obasanjo	6 July 2004	24 January 2006	Nigeria
Denis Sassou-Nguesso	24 January 2006	24 January 2007	Republic of the Congo
John Kufuor	30 January 2007	31 January 2008	Ghana
Jakaya Kikwete	31 January 2008	2 February 2009	Tanzania
Muammar al-Gaddafi	2 February 2009	31 January 2010	Libya
Bingu wa Mutharika	31 January 2010	31 January 2011	Malawi
Teodoro Obiang Nguema Mbasogo	31 January 2011	29 January 2012	Equatorial Guinea
Yayi Boni	29 January 2012	27 January 2013	Benin
Hailemariam Desalegn	27 January 2013	30 January 2014	Ethiopia
Mohamed Ould Abdel Aziz	30 January 2014	30 January 2015	Mauritania
Robert Mugabe	30 January 2015	30 January 2016	Zimbabwe
Idriss Déby	30 January 2016	30 January 2017	Chad
Alpha Condé	30 January 2017	28 January 2018	Guinea
Paul Kagame	28 January 2018	10 February 2019	Rwanda
Abdel Fattah el-Sisi	10 February 2019	10 February 2020	Egypt
Cyril Ramaphosa	10 February 2020	10 February 2021	South Africa
Félix Tshisekedi	10 February 2021	5 February 2022	Democratic Republic of the Congo
Macky Sall	5 February 2022	18 February 2023	Senegal
Azali Assoumani	18 February 2023	17 February 2024	Comoros
Mohamed Ould Ghazouani	17 February 2024	15 February 2025	Mauritania
João Lourenço	15 February 2025	14 February 2026	Angola
Évariste Ndayishimiye	14 February 2026	Incumbent	Burundi

=== Headquarters ===
The main administrative capital of the African Union is in Addis Ababa, Ethiopia, where the African Union Commission is headquartered. A new headquarters complex, the AU Conference Center and Office Complex (AUCC), was inaugurated on 28 January 2012, during the 18th AU summit. The complex was built by China State Construction Engineering Corporation as a gift from the Chinese government, and accommodates, among other facilities, a 2,500-seat plenary hall and a 20-story office tower. The tower is 99.9 meters high to signify the date 9 September 1999, when the Organisation of African Unity voted to become the African Union. The building cost US $200 million to construct.

==== Espionage accusations ====
On 26 January 2018, five years after the completion of the building of the AU Headquarters, the French newspaper Le Monde published an article stating that the Chinese government had heavily bugged the building, installing listening devices in the walls and furniture and setting up the computer system to copy data to servers in Shanghai daily. The Chinese government denied that they bugged the building, stating that the accusations were "utterly groundless and ridiculous". Ethiopian Prime Minister Hailemariam Desalegn rejected the French media report. Moussa Faki Mahamat, head of the African Union Commission, said the allegations in the Le Monde's report were false. "These are totally false allegations and I believe that we are completely disregarding them." The African Union replaced its Chinese-supplied servers and started encrypting its communications following the event.

=== African Union summits ===
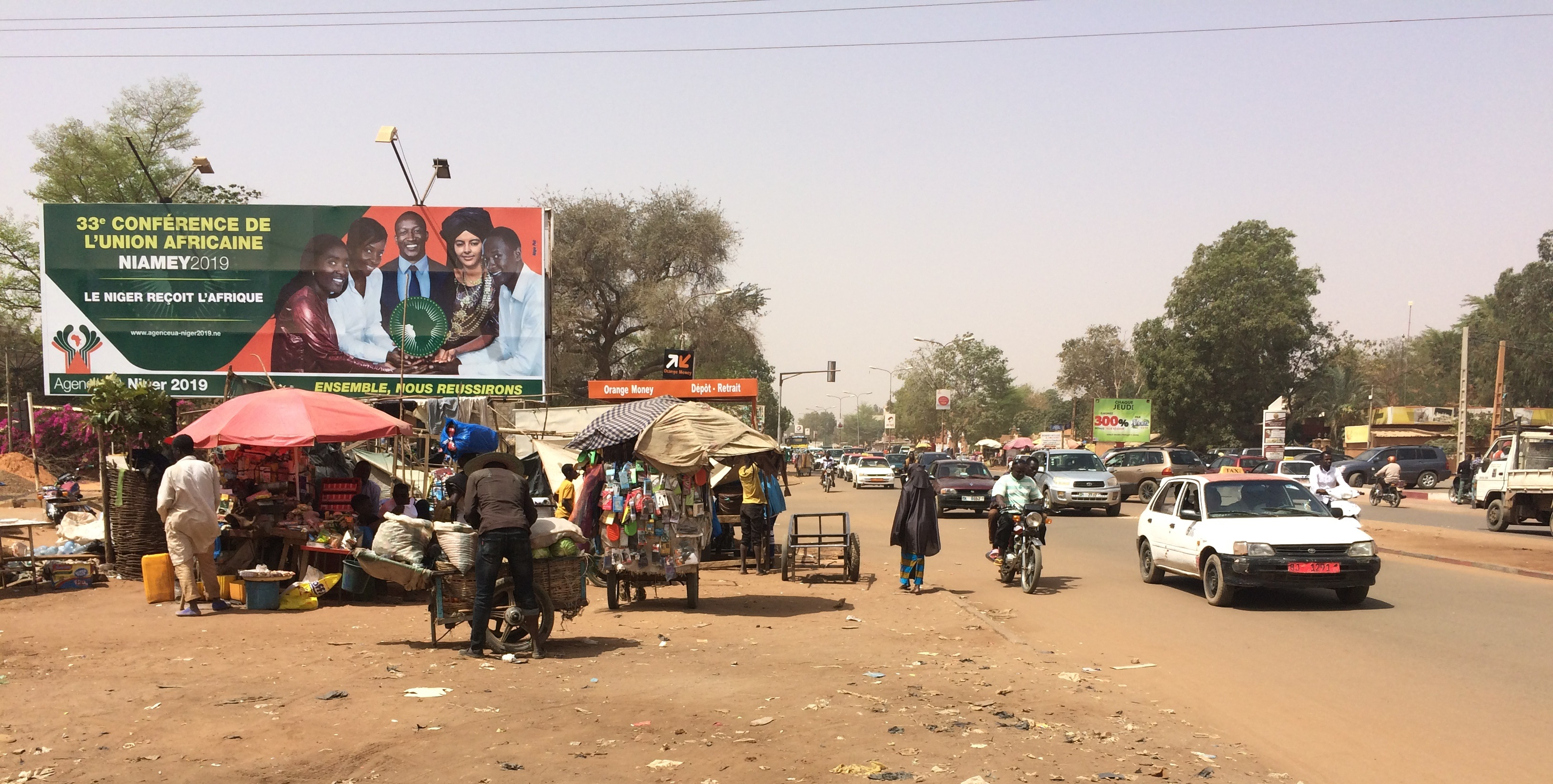
Billboard in Niamey (Niger) announcing the 33rd AU Summit (2019)

Session	Host country	Host city	Date	Theme	Notes
37th	Ethiopia	Addis Ababa	17–18 February 2024	"Educate and Skill Africa for the 21st Century"	
36th	Ethiopia	Addis Ababa	18–19 February 2023		
35th	Ethiopia	Addis Ababa	5–6 February 2022		
34th	Ethiopia	Addis Ababa	6–7 February 2021		
33rd	Ethiopia	Addis Ababa	9–10 February 2020	"Silencing the guns: creating conducive conditions for Africa's development"	Agreement for African Continental Free Trade Agreement to become operational in July 2020. Agreements to reduce gender gap and inequality and to "silence guns" on the continent.
12th Extraordinary Summit on AfCFTA	Niger	Niamey	4–8 July 2019	"Refugees, Returnees and Internally Displaced Persons: Towards Durable Solutions to Forced Displacement in Africa"	Launch of the African Continental Free Trade Agreement
32nd	Ethiopia	Addis Ababa	10–11 February 2019	"Refugees, Returnees and Internally Displaced Persons: Towards Durable Solutions to Forced Displacement in Africa"	
11th Extraordinary Summit on AfCFTA	Ethiopia	Addis Ababa	5–18 November 2018		Agreement reached on reorganisation AU Commission
31st	Mauritania	Nouakchott	25 June – 2 July 2018	"Winning the Fight Against Corruption: A Sustainable Path to Africa's Transformation"	
10th Extraordinary Summit on AfCFTA	Rwanda	Kigali	17–21 March 2018	"Creating One African Market"	Agreement reached on the AfCFTA
30th	Ethiopia	Addis Ababa	22–29 January 2018	"Winning the Fight Against Corruption: A Sustainable Path to Africa's Transformation"	
29th	Ethiopia	Addis Ababa	27 June – 4 July 2017	"Harnessing the Demographic Dividend Through Investments in Youth"	
28th	Ethiopia	Addis Ababa	22–31 January 2017	"Harnessing the Demographic Dividend Through Investments in Youth"	Morocco rejoins the AU after 33 years
27th	Rwanda	Kigali	10–18 July 2016	"African Year of Human Rights with Particular Focus on the Rights of Women"	Launch of African Union Passport
26th	Ethiopia	Addis Ababa	21–31 January 2016	"African Year of Human Rights with Particular Focus on the Rights of Women"	
Third India-Africa Forum Summit	India	New Delhi	26–29 October 2015	"Reinvigorated Partnership—Shared Vision"	
25th	South Africa	Johannesburg	7–15 June 2015	"Year of Women Empowerment and Development Towards Africa's Agenda 2063"	Featured Angelina Jolie
24th	Ethiopia	Addis Ababa	23–31 January 2015	"Year of Women Empowerment and Development Towards Africa's Agenda 2063"	
2nd Africa–Turkey Summit	Equatorial Guinea	Malabo	19–21 November 2014	"A New Model of Partnership to Enhance a Sustainable Development and Integration of Africa"	
23rd	Equatorial Guinea	Malabo	20–27 June 2014	"Year of Agriculture and food security"	
22nd	Ethiopia	Addis Ababa	21–31 January 2014	"Year Agriculture and food security, Marking 10th Anniversary of the Adoption of the Comprehensive Africa Agriculture Development Programme (CAADP)"	
Extraordinary Summit on the ICC	Ethiopia	Addis Ababa	11–12 October 2013	"Africa's Relationship with the ICC"	This was in regards to the ICC's non-adherence to AU calls to drop certain charges against sitting leaders and claims that it was disproportionally targeting Africans.
21st	Ethiopia	Addis Ababa	19–27 May 2013	"Panafricanism and African Renaissance"	50th Anniversary of the Establishment of the Organisation of African Unity
20th	Ethiopia	Addis Ababa	27–28 January 2013	"Panafricanism and African Renaissance"	
Diaspora Summit	South Africa	Sandton	23–25 May 2012	"Towards the Realisation of a United and Integrated Africa and Its Diaspora"	
19th	Ethiopia	Addis Ababa	9–16 July 2012	"Boosting Intra-African Trade"	
18th	Ethiopia	Addis Ababa	23–30 January 2012	"Boosting Intra-African Trade"	
17th	Equatorial Guinea	Malabo	23 June – 1 July 2011	"Youth Empowerment for Sustainable Development"	
2nd Africa–India Summit	Ethiopia	Addis Ababa	20–25 May 2011	"Enhancing partnership: shared vision"	
16th	Ethiopia	Addis Ababa	24–31 January 2011	"Towards Greater Unity and Integration through Shared Values"	
15th	Uganda	Kampala	19–27 July 2010	"Maternal, Infant, and Child Health and Development in Africa"	
14th	Ethiopia	Addis Ababa	25 January – 2 February 2010	"Information and Communication Technologies (ICT) in Africa: Challenges and Prospects for Development"	
13th	Libya	Sirte	24 June – 3 July 2009	"Investing in Agriculture for Economic Growth and Food Security"	
12th	Ethiopia	Addis Ababa	26 January – 3 February 2009	"Infrastructure Development in Africa"	
11th	Egypt	Sharm el-Sheikh	24 June – 1 July 2008	"Meeting the Millennium Development Goals on Water and Sanitation"	
10th	Ethiopia	Addis Ababa	25 January – 2 February 2008	"Industrial Development of Africa"	
9th	Ghana	Accra	25 June – 6 July 2007	"Grand Debate on the Union Government"	
8th	Ethiopia	Addis Ababa	22–30 January 2007	1. "Science, Technology and Scientific Research for Development"; 2. "Climate Change in Africa"	
7th	Gambia	Banjul	25 June – 2 July 2006	"Rationalisation of Recs and Regional Integration"	
6th	Sudan	Khartoum	16–24 January 2006	"Education and Culture"	
5th	Libya	Sirte	28–29 June 2005		
Extraordinary summit on UN Reform	Ethiopia	Addis Ababa	4 August 2005		
4th	Nigeria	Abuja	24–31 January 2005		
3rd	Ethiopia	Addis Ababa	6–8 July 2004		
2nd	Mozambique	Maputo	2–12 July 2003		
1st	South Africa	Durban	28 June 2002 – 10 July 2002	"Peace, Development and Prosperity: The African Century"	Notable events include the launch of the African Union.

=== Foreign relations ===
The individual member states of the African Union coordinate foreign policy through this agency, in addition to conducting their own international relations on a state-by-state basis. The AU represents the interests of African peoples at large in intergovernmental organisations (IGOs); for instance, it is a permanent observer at the United Nations General Assembly. Both the African Union and the United Nations work in tandem to address issues of common concerns in various areas. The African Union Mission to the United Nations aspires to serve as a bridge between the two organisations.

Membership of the AU overlaps with other IGOs, and occasionally, these third-party organisations and the AU will coordinate on matters of public policy. The African Union maintains special diplomatic representation with the United States and the European Union.

==== Africa–Caribbean relations ====
Many Caribbean nations have sought to deepen ties with the continent of Africa. The African Union has referred to the Caribbean as the potential "Sixth Region" of the bloc. Some Caribbean nations moved to join African institutions, including Barbados, the Bahamas and Guyana, which all became members of the African Export–Import Bank. Also, the Caribbean Development Bank signed a cooperation strategic partnership agreement with the African Development Bank (AfDB). Antigua and Barbuda has also shown interest in a direct transport link between Africa and the Caribbean. However, it has resulted in some challenges regarding migration. Africa and the Caribbean have formed a collaborative alliance known as the A3 Plus to formulate matters of common interest in global fora.

==== Africa–China relations ====
One of the leading economic partners of the continent has been the People's Republic of China (PRC). The Forum on China–Africa Cooperation is the main multi-lateral coordination mechanism between the African countries and China. Since joining FOCAC in 2012, the African Union has increasingly played a coordinating role, although each African country in FOCAC continues to represent itself individually.

==== Africa–EU relations ====
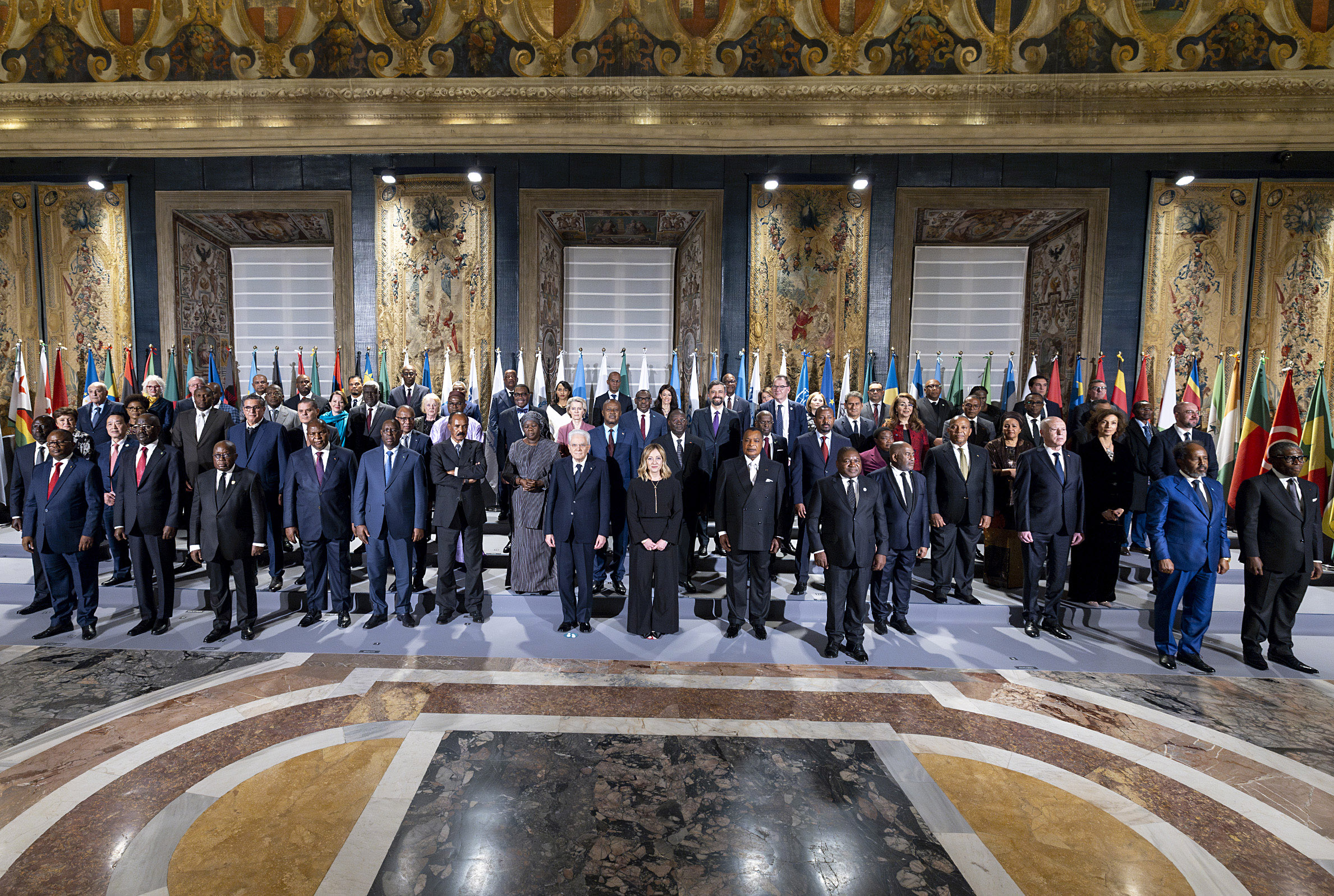
Group photo at the 2024 Italy–Africa Summit in Rome

For the European Commission, the European Union's relationship with Africa is a key priority. The future Africa-EU partnership vision of the European Commission and the European External Action Service is outlined in the Joint Communication "Towards a Comprehensive Strategy with Africa". It proposes partnering on:

- Green Transition and Energy Access
- Digital Transformation
- Sustainable Growth and Jobs
- Peace, Security and Governance
- Migration and Mobility

On 2 December 2020, five Africa-Europe Foundation Strategy Groups were established in the areas of Health, Digital, Agriculture and Sustainable Food Systems, Sustainable energy and Transport and Connectivity. It was done together with a consortium comprising Friends of Europe, Mo Ibrahim Foundation and IPEMED.

In regards to strengthening resilience, peace, security and governance, the African Union and the European Union recognize that resilience, peace, security and governance are all closely linked. Peace and security are important elements for sustainable development, prosperity and resilience of societies. For ensuring peace and security, it had worked out the African Peace Facility. This has been itself replaced in 2021 by the European Peace Facility. The AU and EU are also partnering on promoting sustainable resources management, environmental resilience, and climate change mitigation The Africa Adaptation Initiative is also being supported by the European Union.

==== Africa–India relations ====
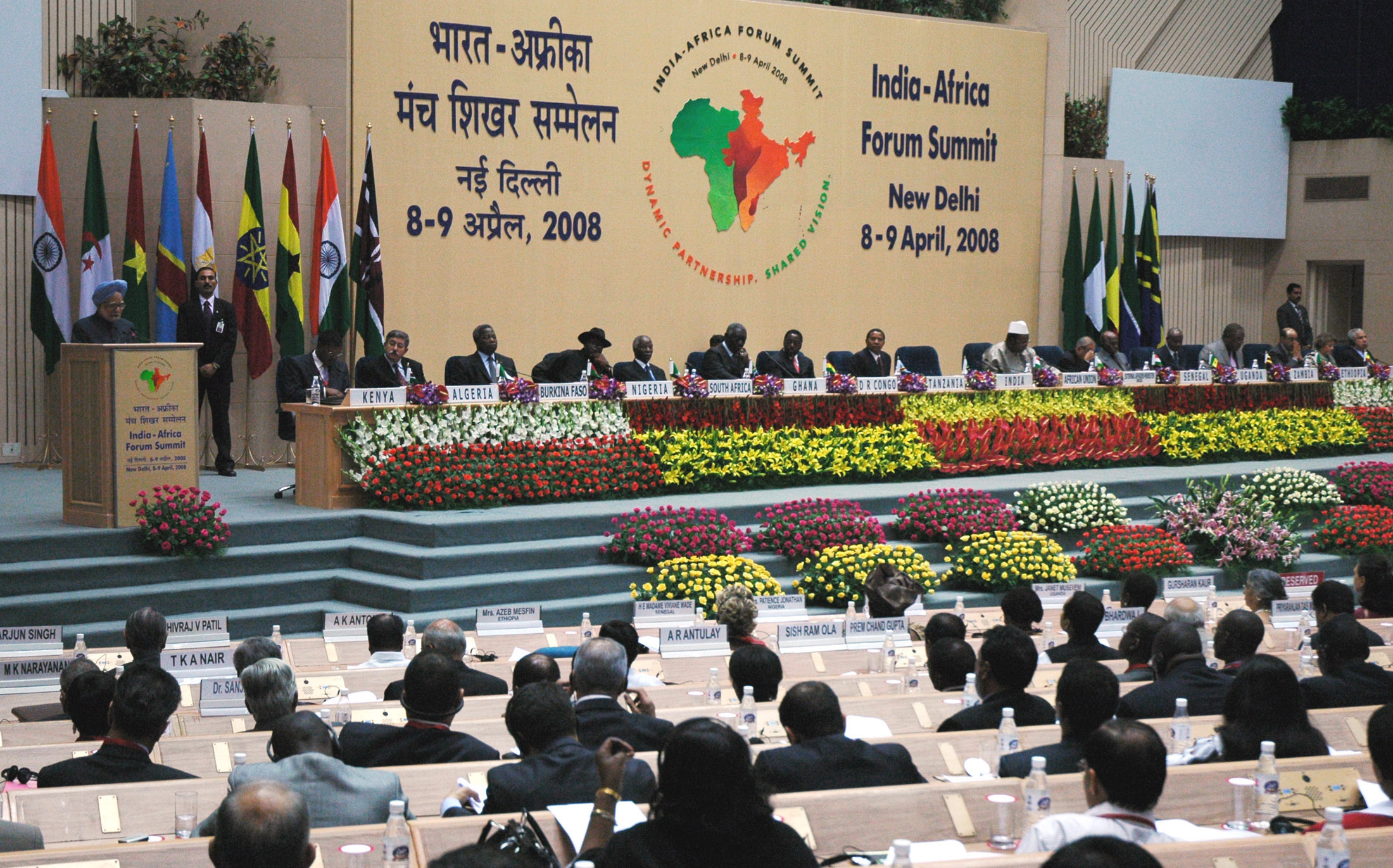
Inaugural India–Africa Forum Summit held in New Delhi, 2008

The India–Africa Forum Summit (IAFS) is the official platform for Africa-India relations. IAFS is held once in every three years. It was first held from April 4 to April 8, 2008 in New Delhi, India. In 2015, the Third India-Africa Forum Summit was held in New Delhi and summit was attended by 51 heads of states of the African Union. In 2023, the African Union was admitted to G20 under the presidency of India, chaired by Prime Minister Narendra Modi in New Delhi.

==== Africa–Palestine relations ====
The African Union periodically invites the President of the State of Palestine to make an opening speech during its annual Summit in Addis Ababa. According to Article 10 of the Rules of Procedure of the Union, during the opening of the meeting sessions, the President of the State of Palestine in person is entitled to make an opening speech. After the Hamas attack on Israel in October 2023, African Union Commission Chairperson Moussa Faki expressed his "utmost concern" at the situation and called for an immediate cessation of hostilities; additionally, he recalled that denial of the fundamental rights of the Palestinian people, particularly that of an independent and sovereign State of Palestine, was the "main cause of the permanent Israeli-Palestinian tension".

==== Africa–Russia relations ====
AU Chairperson Évariste Ndayishimiye, Russian President Vladimir Putin and African leaders at the 2026 Russia–Africa Summit in Moscow

Russia hosted the first Africa-Russia heads-of-state summit on 23–24 October 2019, Representatives from all 54 African states, including 43 heads-of-state or government, attended the summit.

The second Russia-Africa Summit was scheduled for October 2022 in Addis Ababa, but was then rescheduled to 26–29 July 2023 in Saint Petersburg.

==== Africa–South Korea relations ====
The first summit was the South Korea–Africa Summit, Seoul in June 2024.

==== Africa–Turkey relations ====
Turkey–Africa relations have gained substantial momentum since the declaration of Turkey as a strategic partner of the continent by the African Union in January 2008. Since 2008, various major summits and meetings have been taking place between Turkey and AU. The first summit was The Turkey–Africa Cooperation summit, Istanbul in August 2008.

As of 2020, Turkey has embassies in 42 countries and commercial counselors in 26 countries on the Africa continent. Turkey's national flag carrier Turkish Airlines also flies to 35 destinations on the continent.

==== Africa–United Kingdom relations ====
The sovereignty of the Chagos Archipelago in the Indian Ocean is disputed between the United Kingdom and Mauritius. In February 2019, the International Court of Justice in The Hague issued an advisory opinion stating that the UK must transfer the Chagos Archipelago to Mauritius. The African Union has urged the United Kingdom to comply with a United Nations General Assembly resolution calling for it to withdraw from the Chagos Islands.

==== Africa–United States relations ====
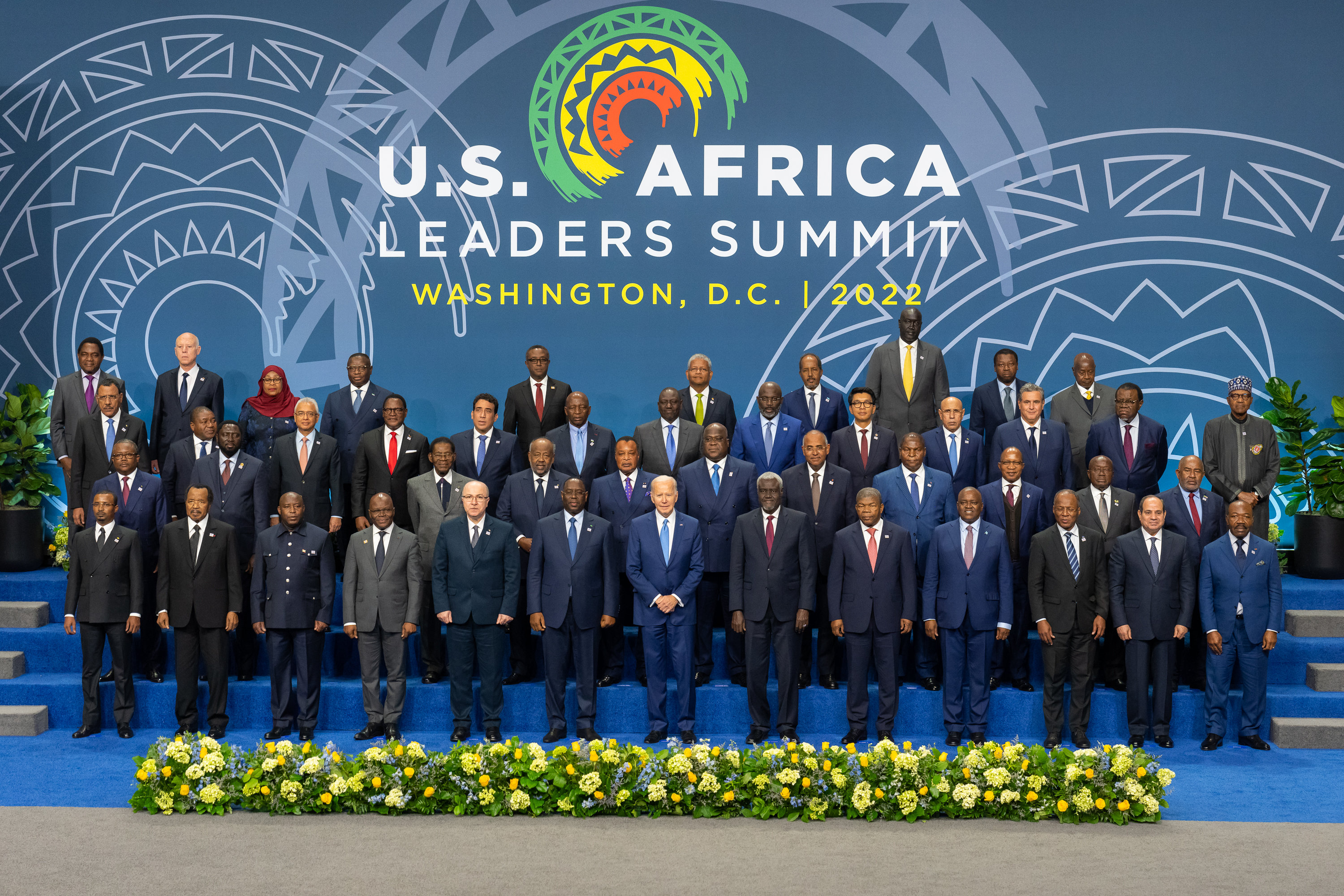
AUC Chairperson Moussa Faki, US President Joe Biden and African leaders at the United States–Africa Leaders Summit in Washington, D.C., 15 December 2022

In 2017, Donald Trump, President of the United States, issued an executive order to ban citizens from seven countries with suspected links to terrorism from entering the United States. Three of these are African countries, and members of the AU. During the 28th African Union Summit in Ethiopia, African leaders criticised the ban as they expressed their growing concerns for the future of the African economy under President Trump's leadership and subsequent policies.

=== Military ===
The African Union has the power to militarily intervene on behalf of its member states as laid out in Article 4(h) of the Constitutive Act of the African Union, "in respect of grave circumstances, namely: war crimes, genocide and crimes against humanity".

==== Togo ====
In response to the death of Gnassingbé Eyadéma, President of Togo, on 5 February 2005, AU leaders described the appointment of his son, Faure Gnassingbé, to the presidency to have been a military coup. Togo's constitution calls for the speaker of parliament to succeed the president in the event of his death. By law, the parliament speaker must call national elections to choose a new president within sixty days. The AU's protest forced Gnassingbé to hold elections. Under heavy allegations of election fraud, he was officially elected president on 4 May 2005.

==== Mauritania ====
On 3 August 2005, a coup in Mauritania led the African Union to suspend the country from all organisational activities. The military council that took control of Mauritania promised to hold elections within two years. These were held in early 2007, the first time that the country had held elections that were generally agreed to be of an acceptable standard. Following the elections, Mauritania's membership of the AU was restored. However, on 6 August 2008, a fresh coup overthrew the government elected in 2007. The AU once again suspended Mauritania from the continental body. The suspension was once again lifted in 2009 after the military junta agreed with the opposition to organise elections.

==== Mali ====
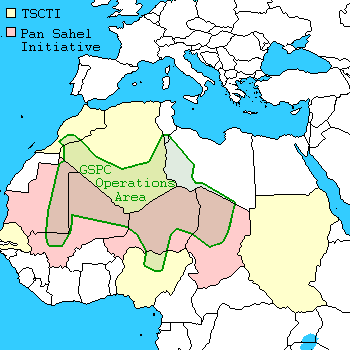
Al-Qaeda in the Islamic Maghreb (formerly GSPC) area of operations

In March 2012, a military coup was staged in Mali, when an alliance of Touareg and Islamist forces conquered the north, resulting in a coming to power of the Islamists. This resulted in the deaths of hundreds of Malian soldiers and the loss of control over their camps and positions. After a military intervention with help from French troops, the region was in control of the Malian army. To reinstall local authorities, the AU helped to form a caretaker government, supporting it and holding presidential elections in Mali in July 2013.

In 2013, a summit for the African Union was held and it was decided that the African Union was going to enlarge their military presence in Mali. The AU decided to do this because of increasing tensions between al-Qaeda forces and the Mali army. There have been several rebel groups that are vying for control of parts of Mali. These rebel groups include the National Movement for the Liberation of Azawad (MNLA), the National Front for the Liberation of Azawad (FLNA), Ganda Koy, Ganda Izo, Ansar ad-Din, and Al-Qaeda in the Islamic Maghreb (AQIM). AU forces have been tasked with counterinsurgency missions in Mali as well as governing presidential elections to ensure as smooth a transition of power as possible.

==== 2021 hotspots ====
A disputed election in December 2020 has led to intensification of the Central African Republic Civil War, displacing 200,000 people. United Nations peacekeepers, including soldiers from Russia and Rwanda, have kept the rebels out of Bangui, but rebels control much of the rest of the country. The AU has not sent peacekeepers to the areas because of a lack of agreement on how to handle the situation: Chad and the Republic of the Congo support the rebels while Rwanda and Angola support the government.

The Tigray War in Ethiopia has left millions in need of humanitarian aid. Eritrean troops are said to be supporting the Ethiopian government, and there have been border conflicts with Sudan. The relationship between Sudan and Ethiopia is further complicated by the Grand Ethiopian Renaissance Dam project, which also directly affects Egypt.

===== Coup Belt =====
Map of successful coups in Africa since 2020

The term Coup Belt originated from coups that were staged beginning in the early 2020s, including in Mali in 2020 and 2021, Guinea, Chad, and Sudan in 2021, two in Burkina Faso in January and September in 2022, and Niger and Gabon in 2023. The region also saw attempted coups in Niger and Sudan in 2021, Guinea–Bissau and The Gambia in 2022, and Sudan and Sierra Leone in 2023. After the 2023 Nigerien coup, these countries formed a continuous chain stretching between the east and west coasts of Africa.

=== Regional conflicts and peacekeeping ===
One of the objectives of the AU is to "promote peace, security, and stability on the continent". Among its principles is "Peaceful resolution of conflicts among Member States of the Union through such appropriate means as may be decided upon by the Assembly". The primary body charged with implementing these objectives and principles is the Peace and Security Council. The PSC has the power, among other things, to authorise peace support missions, to impose sanctions in case of unconstitutional change of government, and to "take initiatives and action it deems appropriate" in response to potential or actual conflicts. The PSC is a decision-making body in its own right, and its decisions are binding on member states.

Article 4(h) of the Constitutive Act, repeated in Article 4 of the Protocol to the Constitutive Act on the PSC, also recognises the right of the Union to intervene in a member state in circumstances of war crimes, genocide and crimes against humanity. Any decision to intervene in a member state under Article 4 of the Constitutive Act will be made by the Assembly on the recommendation of the PSC.

Since it first met in 2004, the PSC has been active in relation to the crises in Darfur, Comoros, Somalia, Democratic Republic of the Congo, Burundi, Ivory Coast and other countries. It has adopted resolutions creating the AU peacekeeping operations in Somalia and Darfur, and imposing sanctions against persons undermining peace and security (such as travel bans and asset freezes against the leaders of the rebellion in Comoros). The council is in the process of overseeing the establishment of a "standby force" to serve as a permanent African peacekeeping force.

The founding treaty of the AU also called for the establishment of the African Peace and Security Architecture (APSA), including the African Standby Force (ASF), which is to be deployed in emergencies. That means, in cases of genocide or other serious human-rights violations, an ASF mission can be launched even against the wishes of the government of the country concerned, as long as it is approved by the AU. In past AU peacekeeping missions, the concept was not yet applied and forces had to be mobilised from member states. Although the ASF was declared fully operational in 2016 and used from 2017 onwards in ECOWAS, ECCAS and SADC interventions to the Gambia, Lesotho, Mozambique and the Democratic Republic of the Congo, it has not been deployed in the same way as originally conceived. Instead of the PSC acting as the primary initiator of ASF action as previously planned, Regional Economic Communities have taken charge of mobilizing ASF capabilities. In light of continued criticism, ASF reform remains a prominent topic of discussion at the AU.

==== Darfur, Sudan ====
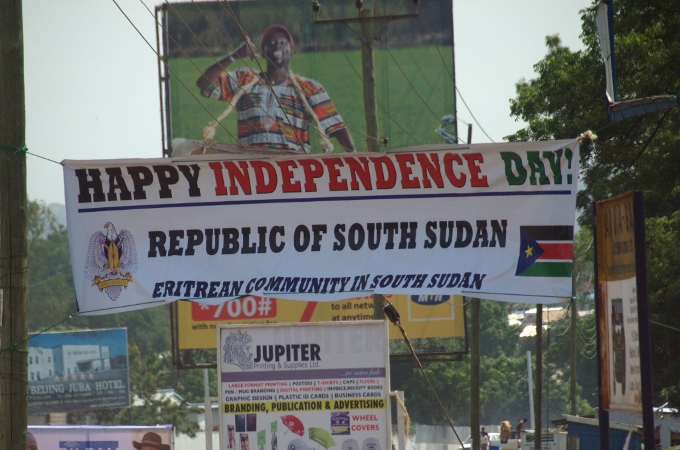
South Sudanese independence referendum, 2011

In response to the 2003–2020 Darfur conflict in Sudan, the AU deployed 7,000 peacekeepers, many from Rwanda and Nigeria, to Darfur. While a donor's conference in Addis Ababa in 2005 helped raise funds to sustain the peacekeepers through that year and into 2006, in July 2006 the AU said it would pull out at the end of September when its mandate expires. Critics of the AU peacekeepers, including Eric Reeves, said these forces were largely ineffective due to lack of funds, personnel, and expertise. In June 2006, the United States Congress appropriated US $173 million for the AU force. Some, such as the Genocide Intervention Network, called for UN or NATO intervention to augment and/or replace the AU peacekeepers. The UN considered deploying a force, though it would not likely enter the country until at least October 2007. The under-funded and badly equipped AU mission was set to expire on 31 December 2006 but was extended to 30 June 2007 and merged with the United Nations African Union Mission in Darfur in October 2007. In July 2009 the African Union ceased cooperation with the International Criminal Court, refusing to recognise the international arrest warrant it had issued against Sudan's leader, Omar al-Bashir, who was indicted in 2008 for war crimes.

The AU struggled to have a strategic role in the independence talks and the reconciliation process of South Sudan, due to overwhelming interests of African and non-African powers, its influence was limited and not consistent.

==== Somalia ====
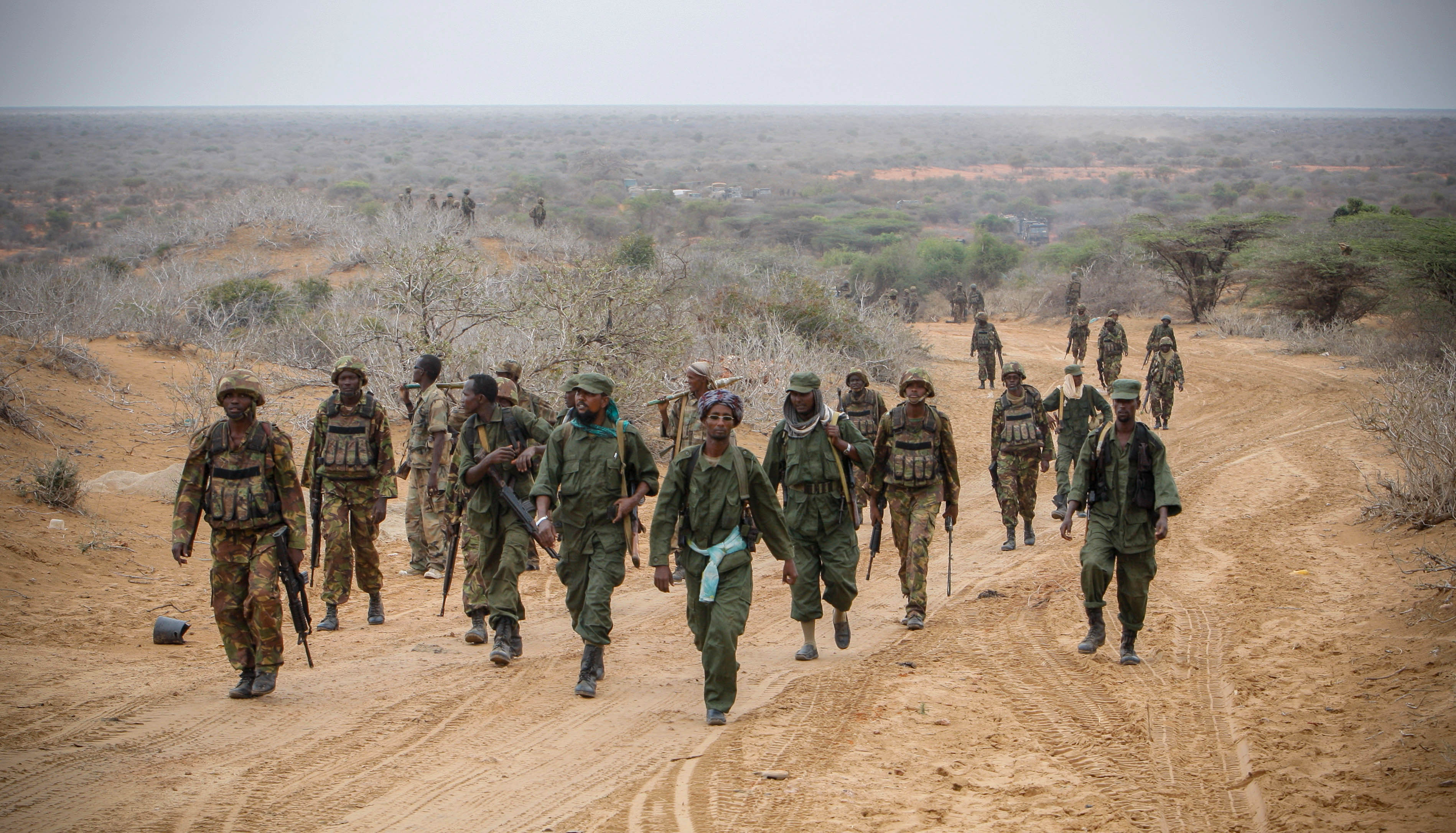
Kenyan soldiers and fighters of the Ras Kamboni Brigades, a Somali government-allied militia, near Kismayo, Somalia, 2012

From the early 1990s up until 2000, Somalia was without a functioning central government. A peace agreement aimed at ending the civil war that broke out following the collapse of the Siad Barre regime was signed in 2006 after many years of peace talks. However, the new government was almost immediately threatened by further violence. In February 2007, the African Union (AU) and European Union (EU) worked together to establish the African Union Mission in Somalia (AMISOM). The purpose of AMISOM was to create a foundation that would hopefully provide aid to some of Somalia's most vulnerable and keep the peace in the region. They are tasked with everything from protecting federal institutions to facilitating humanitarian relief operations. Much of the AU's opposition comes from an Islamic extremist group named al-Shabaab. To temporarily shore up the government's military base, starting in March 2007, AU soldiers began arriving in Mogadishu as part of a peacekeeping force that was intended by the AU to eventually be 8,000 strong. Eritrea recalled its ambassadors to the African Union on 20 November 2009 after the African Union called on the United Nations Security Council to impose sanctions on them due to their alleged support of Somali Islamists attempting to topple the Transitional Federal Government of Somalia, the internationally recognised government of Somalia which holds Somalia's seat on the African Union. On 22 December 2009, the United Nations Security Council passed UNSCR 1907, which imposed an arms embargo on Eritrea, travel bans on Eritrean leaders, and asset freezes on Eritrean officials. Eritrea strongly criticised the resolution. In January 2011, Eritrea reestablished their mission to the AU in Addis Ababa.

In the fall of 2011, AMISOM forces, along with Kenyan and Ethiopian forces, launched a set of offensive attacks on the al-Shabaab. In these attacks, AMISOM forces were able to reclaim key cities including the Somali capital of Mogadishu. In September 2013, political scientist Ethan Bueno de Mesquita argued that with the help of AMISOM forces, they had made it "nearly impossible for al-Shabaab to hold territory even in its former strongholds in southern Somalia". Although much progress has been made towards peace in the region, it should still be noted that African Union forces' still get attacked regularly. Despite AMISOM being effective, it is vastly underfunded and many forces lack the resources required. Funding for humanitarian relief and the formation of armies tends to be vastly undercut.

==== Anjouan, Comoros ====
A successful 2008 invasion of Anjouan by AU and Comoros forces to stop self-declared president Mohamed Bacar, whose 2007 re-election was declared illegal. Prior to the invasion, France helped transport Tanzanian troops but their position in the disagreement was questioned when a French police helicopter was suspected of attempting to sneak Bacar into French exile. The first wave of troops landed on Anjouan Bay on 25 March and soon took over the airfield in Ouani, ultimately aiming to locate and remove Bacar from office. On the same day, the airport, capital, and second city were overrun and the presidential palace was deserted. Bacar escaped and sought asylum in France. The Comoros government demanded his return, in order to determine his fate. Many of Bacar's main supporters were arrested by the end of March, including Caabi El-Yachroutu Mohamed and Ibrahim Halidi. Bacar's asylum request was rejected on 15 May, as France agreed to cooperate with the Comoran government's demand. At 29 June elections, Moussa Toybou won the presidency.

=== Current issues ===
The AU faces many challenges, including health issues such as combating malaria and the AIDS/HIV epidemic; political issues such as confronting undemocratic regimes and mediating in the many civil wars; economic issues such as improving the standard of living of millions of impoverished, uneducated Africans; ecological issues such as dealing with recurring famines, desertification, and lack of ecological sustainability; as well as the legal issues regarding Western Sahara.

==== Corruption ====
Daniel Batidam, an anti-corruption advisory board member of the African Union, resigned after stating that the organisation had "multiple irregularities" and that "issues have come up over and over again" regarding corruption. The African Union quickly accepted his resignation, with Batidam saying that it was a sign that mismanagement towards corruption will "continue with business as usual".

In a story published on 12 March 2020, AU staff alleged that Commission chairman Moussa Faki Mahamat was guilty of corruption and cronyism, as well as running of a "mafia-style cartel" that operates with impunity. The allegations were contained in a memo leaked to the South African Mail & Guardian. This followed sexual harassment allegations raised in late 2018.

==== Libyan crisis ====
In 2011, when the conflict in Libya began, the African Union was initially criticised for doing little to prevent the conflict's escalation. Additionally, the AU hesitated to take a side. It was unclear whether the AU supported the Libyan regime or the rebels. This occurred as several human rights violations were perpetrated against members of the Libyan regime. It was later realised that the AU's hesitation was due to its lack of capacity and its inability to engage in democratic reform.

The AU attempted to mediate in the early stages of the 2011 Libyan civil war, forming an ad hoc committee of five presidents (Congolese President Denis Sassou Nguesso, Malian President Amadou Toumani Touré, Mauritanian President Mohamed Ould Abdel Aziz, South African President Jacob Zuma, and Ugandan President Yoweri Museveni) to broker a truce. However, the beginning of the NATO-led military intervention in March 2011 prevented the committee from traveling to Libya to meet with Libyan leader Muammar Gaddafi. As a body, the AU sharply dissented from the United Nations Security Council's decision to create a no-fly zone over Libya, though a few member states, such as Botswana, Gabon, Zambia, and others expressed support for the resolution.

As a result of Gaddafi's defeat at the Battle of Tripoli (the war's deciding battle), in August 2011, the Arab League voted to recognise the anti-Gaddafi National Transitional Council as the legitimate government of the country, pending elections. The council has been recognised by several AU member states, including two Arab League members. However, the AU Peace and Security Council voted on 26 August 2011 not to recognise it, insisting on a ceasefire and on the formation of a national unity government by both sides. A number of AU member states led by Ethiopia, Nigeria, and Rwanda requested that the AU recognise the NTC as Libya's interim governing authority, and several other AU member states have recognised the NTC regardless of the Peace and Security Council's decision. However, AU member states Algeria and Zimbabwe have indicated they will not recognise the NTC, and South Africa has expressed reservations as well.

On 20 September 2011, the African Union officially recognised the National Transitional Council as the legitimate representative of Libya.

In post-Gaddafi Libya, the African Union believes it still has an important responsibility to the country despite its failure to contribute to the conflict when it originated. Although the African Union is there to keep peace, it is not a long-term solution. The goal, as stated by the AU, is to establish a Libyan government that is sustainable to ensuring peace in Libya. To achieve some level of peace in Libya, the AU has to moderate peace talks which are aimed at achieving compromises and power sharing accommodations as well.

== Geography ==
Regions of the African Union: Northern Western Southern Eastern Central

Member states of the African Union cover almost the entirety of continental Africa, except for several territories held by Spain (Ceuta, Melilla, and Peñón de Vélez de la Gomera). In addition, European countries have dependencies among the offshore islands of Africa: Spain (the Canary Islands and the islands of the plazas de soberanía); France (Mayotte, Réunion, and the Scattered Islands in the Indian Ocean); Portugal (the Azores, Madeira, and the Savage Islands); and the United Kingdom (Saint Helena, Ascension and Tristan da Cunha). The geography of the African Union is wildly diverse, including the world's largest hot desert (the Sahara), huge jungles and savannas, and the world's longest river (the Nile).

The AU has an area of 29,922,059 square kilometres (11,552,972 sq mi), with 24,165 kilometres (15,015 mi) of coastline. The vast majority of this area is on continental Africa, while the only significant territories off the mainland are the island of Madagascar (the world's largest microcontinent and fourth-largest island) and the Sinai Peninsula (geographically a part of Asia), accounting for slightly less than 2% of the total area.

== Economy ==
The African Continental Free Trade Area (AfCFTA) was created among 54 of the 55 AU nations, with trade commencing as of 1 January 2021. The African Export–Import Bank, to support this initiative, created the Pan-African Payment and Settlement System.

The AU's future goals include a customs union, a single market, a central bank, and a common currency (see African Monetary Union), thereby establishing economic and monetary union.

The AU has a memorandum of understanding with China to participate in the Belt and Road Initiative, as do 52 of the AU's member countries, as of 2026.

=== Indicators ===
The following table shows various data for AU member states, including area, population, economic output and income inequality, as well as various indices, including human development, viability of the state, perception of corruption, economic freedom, state of peace, freedom of the press and democratic level.

Country	Land Area (km^{2}) 2015	Population 2021	GDP (PPP) (Intl$. ) 2015	GDP (PPP) per capita (Intl$. ) 2015	HDI 2014	FSI 2016	CPI 2016	IEF 2016	GPI 2016	WPFI 2016	DI 2016
Algeria	2,381,741	44,177,969	548,293,085,686	13,823	0.736	78.3	34	50.06	2.21	41.69	3.56
Angola	1,246,700	34,503,774	173,593,223,667	6,938	0.532	90.5	18	48.94	2.14	39.89	3.40
Benin	112,760	12,996,895	21,016,184,357	1,932	0.48	78.9	36	59.31	2.00	28.97	5.67
Botswana	566,730	2,588,423	33,657,545,969	14,876	0.698	63.5	60	71.07	1.64	22.91	7.87
Burkina Faso	273,600	22,100,683	28,840,666,622	1,593	0.402	89.4	42	59.09	2.06	22.66	4.70
Burundi	25,680	12,551,213	7,634,578,343	300	0.4	100.7	20	53.91	2.50	54.10	2.40
Cape Verde	4,030	587,925	3,205,197,585	6,158	0.646	71.5	59	66.46	N/A	19.82	7.94
Cameroon	472,710	27,198,628	68,302,439,597	2,926	0.512	97.8	26	54.18	2.36	40.53	3.46
Central African Republic	622,980	5,457,154	2,847,726,468	581	0.35	112.1	20	45.23	3.35	33.60	1.61
Chad	1,259,200	17,179,740	28,686,194,920	2,044	0.392	110.1	20	46.33	2.46	40.59	1.50
Comoros	1,861	821,625	1,098,546,195	1,393	0.503	83.8	24	52.35	N/A	24.33	3.71
Congo, Democratic Republic of the	2,267,050	95,894,118	56,920,935,460	300	0.433		21	46.38	3.11	50.97	1.93
Congo, Republic of the	341,500	5,835,806	27,690,345,067	5,993	0.591	92.2	20	42.80	2.25	35.84	2.91
Djibouti	23,180	1,105,557	2,911,406,226	3,279	0.47	89.7	30	55.96	2.29	70.90	2.83
Egypt	1,010,407	109,262,178	1,173,000,000,000	10,250	0.69	90.2	34	55.96	2.57	54.45	3.31
Equatorial Guinea	28,050	1,634,466	32,317,928,931	38,243	0.587	85.2	N/A	43.67	1.94	66.47	1.70
Eritrea	101,000	3,620,312	8,845,000,000^{b}	600^{b}	0.391	98.6	18	42.7	2.46	83.92	2.37
Eswatini	17,204	1,192,271	10,452,834,007	8,122	0.531	87.6	N/A	59.65	2.07	52.37	3.03
Ethiopia	1,104,300	120,283,026	152,057,290,468	1,530	0.442	97.2	34	51.52	2.28	45.13	3.60
Gabon	257,670	2,341,179	32,539,376,597	18,860	0.684	72	35	58.96	2.03	32.20	3.74
Gambia, The	10,120	2,639,916	3,140,820,062	1,578	0.441	86.8	26	57.14	2.09	46.53	2.91
Ghana	227,540	32,833,031	108,393,071,924	3,955	0.579	71.2	43	63.00	1.81	17.95	6.75
Guinea	245,720	13,531,906	14,316,884,358	1,135	0.411	103.8	27	53.33	2.15	33.08	3.14
Guinea-Bissau	28,120	2,060,721	2,521,743,682	1,367	0.42	99.8	16	51.81	2.26	29.03	1.98
Ivory Coast	318,000	27,478,249	74,916,780,423	3,300	0.462	97.9	34	60.01	2.28	30.17	3.81
Kenya	569,140	53,005,614	133,592,522,053	2,901	0.548	98.3	26	57.51	2.38	31.16	5.33
Lesotho	30,360	2,281,454	5,914,437,068	2,770	0.497	80.9	39	50.62	1.94	28.78	6.59
Liberia	96,320	5,193,416	3,533,313,381	500	0.43	95.5	37	52.19	2.00	30.71	5.31
Libya	1,759,540	6,735,277	94,010,000,000^{b}	14,900^{b}	0.724	96.4	14	N/A	3.20	57.89	2.25
Madagascar	581,800	28,915,653	33,354,200,458	1,376	0.51	84.2	26	61.06	1.76	27.04	5.07
Malawi	94,280	19,889,742	19,137,290,349	1,112	0.445	87.6	31	51.8	1.82	28.12	5.55
Mali	1,220,190	21,904,983	33,524,899,739	1,905	0.419	95.2	32	56.54	2.49	39.83	5.70
Mauritania	1,030,700	4,614,974	16,190,000,000^{b}	4,400^{b}	0.506	95.4	27	54.8	2.30	24.03	3.96
Mauritius	2,030	1,298,915	23,817,914,134	18,864	0.777	43.2	54	74.73	1.56	27.69	8.28
Morocco	446,300	37,076,584	257,398,957,178	7,365	0.628	74.2	37	61.27	2.09	42.64	4.77
Mozambique	786,380	32,077,072	31,326,751,237	1,120	0.416	87.8	27	53.19	1.96	30.25	4.02
Namibia	823,290	2,530,151	24,043,436,006	9,778	0.628	71.1	52	61.85	1.87	15.15	6.31
Niger	1,266,700	25,252,722	17,857,377,171	897	0.348	98.4	35	54.26	2.24	24.62	3.96
Nigeria	910,770	213,401,323	1,168,000,000,000	5,639	0.514	103.5	28	57.46	2.88	35.90	4.50
Rwanda	24,670	13,461,888	19,216,033,048	1,655	0.483	91.3	54	63.07	2.32	54.61	3.07
São Tomé and Príncipe	960	223,107	575,391,345	3,023	0.555	72.9	46	56.71	N/A	N/A	N/A
Senegal	192,530	16,876,720	34,398,281,018	2,274	0.466	83.6	45	58.09	1.98	27.99	6.21
Seychelles	460	106,471	2,384,515,771	25,525	0.772	60.2	N/A	62.2	N/A	30.60	N/A
Sierra Leone	72,180	8,420,641	9,511,431,824	1,474	0.413	91	30	52.31	1.81	29.94	4.55
Somalia	627,340	17,065,581	5,900,000,000^{c}	600^{c}	N/A	114	10	N/A	3.41	65.35	N/A
South Africa	1,213,090	59,392,255	742,461,000,000	12,393	0.666	69.9	45	61.9	2.32	21.92	7.41
South Sudan	619,745	10,748,272	21,484,823,398	1,741	0.467	113.8	11	N/A	3.59	44.87	N/A
Sudan	1,886,086	45,657,202	165,813,461,495	4,121	0.479	111.5	14	N/A	3.27	72.53	2.37
Tanzania	885,800	63,588,334	130,297,806,032	2,510	0.521	81.8	32	58.46	1.90	28.65	5.76
Togo	54,390	8,644,829	10,018,697,437	1,372	0.484	85.8	32	53.64	1.95	30.31	3.32
Tunisia	155,360	12,262,946	121,200,025,401	10,770	0.721	74.6	41	57.55	1.95	31.60	6.40
Uganda	200,520	45,853,778	67,856,334,117	1,738	0.483	97.7	25	59.26	2.15	32.58	5.26
Sahrawi Arab Democratic Republic	266,000	565,581	906,500,000^{d}	2,500^{d}	N/A	N/A	N/A	N/A	N/A	N/A	N/A
Zambia	743,390	19,473,125	58,400,082,027	3,602	0.586	86.3	38	58.79	1.78	35.08	5.99
Zimbabwe	386,850	15,993,524	26,180,942,292	500	0.509	100.5	22	38.23	2.32	40.41	3.05
African Union	30,370,000	1,393,676,444	5,457,724,064,668	4,602	0.524^{d}	88.99^{d}	31.51^{d}	55.55^{d}	2.27	37.89	4.30
Country	Land Area (km^{2}) 2015	Population 2021	GDP (PPP) (Intl$. ) 2015	GDP (PPP) per capita (Intl$. ) 2015	HDI 2014	FSI 2016	CPI 2016	IEF 2016	GPI 2016	WPFI 2016	DI 2016

^{a} External data from 2016. ^{b} External data from 2015. ^{c} External data from 2014. ^{d} AU total used for indicators 1 through 3; AU weighted average used for indicator 4; AU unweighted average used for indicators 5 through 12.

== Demographics ==
=== Population ===
The total population of the African Union, as of 2017, is estimated at more than 1.25 billion, with a growth rate of more than 2.5% p.a.

=== Migration ===
In 2018, the African Union adopted the Free Movement Protocol. This protocol allows for free movement of people between countries that are part of the African Union.

Article 14 of the Protocol to the treaty establishing the African economic community relating to the free movement of persons, right of residence, and the right of establishment discusses the free movement of workers.

The African Union also has a Migration Policy Framework for Africa (MPFA).

Forced displacement of people and groups has also been an area of focus for the AU—over thirty states have ratified the Kampala Convention, the only continental treaty focusing on internally displaced persons in the world.

Beginning in 2016, the African Union introduced continent-wide passports.

As of 2025 there has been an increased push for an implementation of the Free Movement Protocol. The UN has urged more states to ratify the protocol, and has praised Ghana for allowing visa free travel for all individuals with a passport of an African country.

=== Languages ===
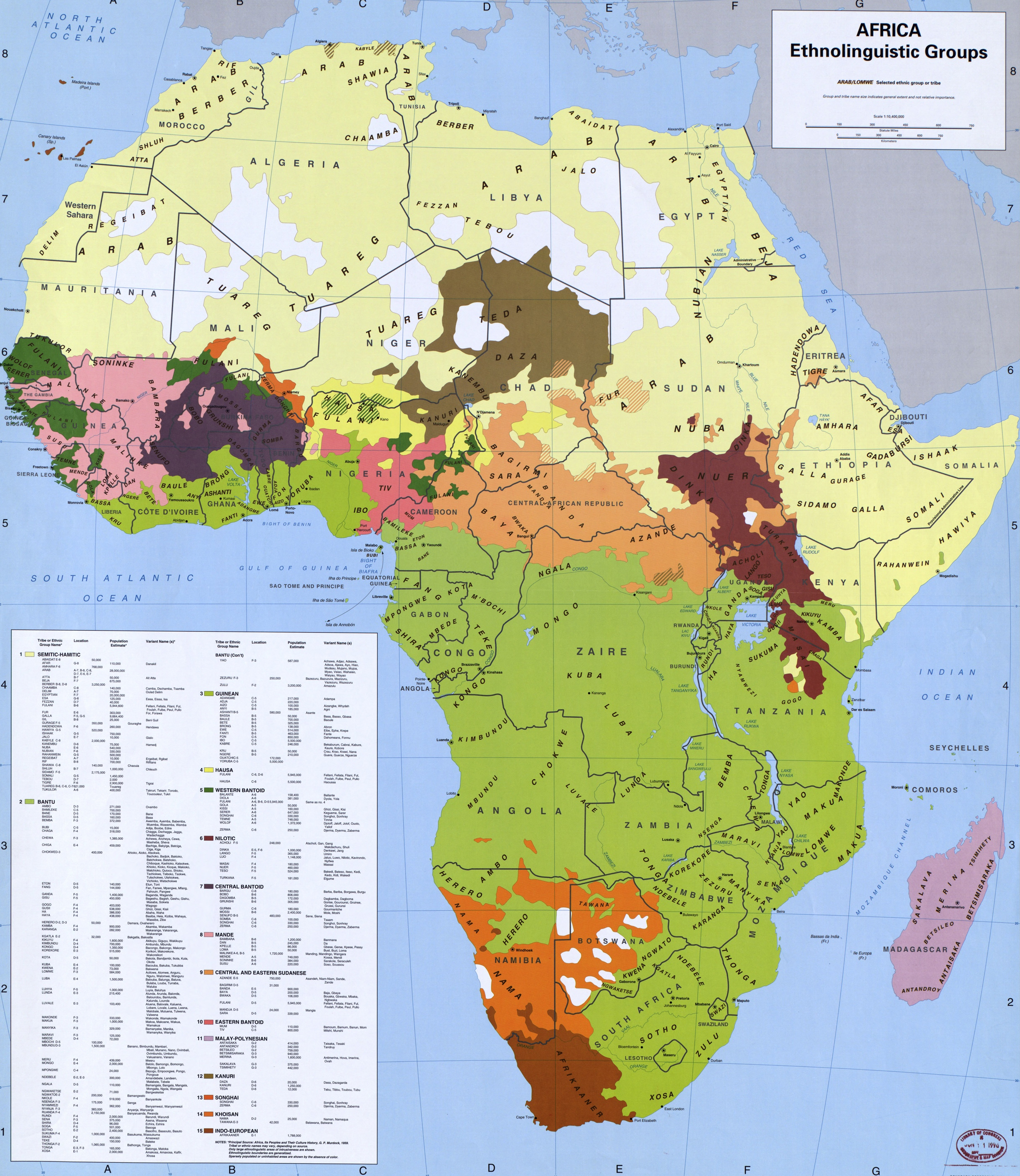
Map showing the traditional language families represented in Africa (1996)

The official languages of the African Union are Arabic, English, French, Portuguese, Spanish, Swahili, and "any other African language". The primary working languages of the African Union are English and French. To a lesser extent Portuguese and Arabic are used. The Constitutive Act, for example, is written in English, French and Arabic, while the protocol amending the Constitutive Act is written in English, French and Portuguese. As of 2020, the AU website is available in its entirety in English, partially in French and minimally in Arabic. Portuguese and Swahili versions were added as "coming soon" (em breve) in April 2019.

According to the Constitutive Act of the African Union:

The working languages of the Union and all its institutions shall be, if possible, African languages, Arabic, English, French and Portuguese.

A protocol amending the Constitutive Act was adopted in 2003 and as of April 2020 has been ratified by 30 of the 37 member states needed for a two-thirds majority. It would change the above wording to:

1. The official languages of the Union and all its institutions shall be Arabic, English, French, Portuguese, Spanish, Kiswahili and any other African language.
2. The Executive Council shall determine the process and practical modalities for the use of official languages as working languages.

Founded in 2001 under the auspices of the AU, the African Academy of Languages promotes the usage and perpetuation of African languages among African people. In 2004 Joaquim Chissano of Mozambique addressed the assembly in Swahili, but had to translate his words himself. The AU declared 2006 the Year of African Languages. 2006 also marked Ghana's 55th anniversary since it founded the Bureau of Ghana Languages, originally known as the Gold Coast Vernacular Literature Bureau.

=== Health ===
==== AIDS in Africa ====
Prevalence of HIV/AIDS in Africa, total (% of population ages 15–49), in 2011 (World Bank) over 15% 5–15% 2–5% 1–2% 0.5–1% 0.1–0.5% not available

The AU has been active in addressing the AIDS pandemic in Africa. In 2001, the AU established AIDS Watch Africa to coordinate and mobilise a continent-wide response. Sub-Saharan Africa, especially southern and eastern Africa, is the most affected area in the world. Though this region is home to only 6.2% of the world's population, it is also home to half of the world's population infected with HIV. While the measurement of HIV prevalence rates has proved methodologically challenging, more than 20% of the sexually active population of many countries of southern Africa may be infected, with South Africa, Botswana, Kenya, Namibia, and Zimbabwe all expected to have a decrease in life expectancy by an average of 6.5 years. The pandemic has had massive implications for the economy of the continent, reducing economic growth rates by 2–4% across Africa.

In July 2007, the AU endorsed two new initiatives to combat the AIDS crisis, including a push to recruit, train and integrate two million community health workers into the continent's healthcare systems.

In January 2012, the African Union Assembly requested that the African Union Commission would work out "a roadmap of shared responsibility to draw on African efforts for a viable health funding with support of traditional and emerging partners to address AIDS dependency response". Once created, the roadmap (as it is officially known) provided a group of solutions that would enhance the shared responsibility and global solidarity for AIDS, TB, and Malaria responses in Africa by 2015. The roadmap was organised into three pillars: diversified financing, access to medicines, and enhanced health governance. The roadmap held stakeholders accountable for the realisation of these solutions between 2012 and 2015.

The first pillar, diversified financing, ensures that countries begin to develop a country specific financial sustainability plans with clear targets, and identify and maximise opportunities to diversify funding sources in order to increase the domestic resource allocation to AIDS and other diseases.

The second pillar, access to affordable and quality-assured medicines, tries to promote and facilitate investing in leading medicine hub manufacturers in Africa, accelerate and strengthen medicine regulatory harmonisation, and create legislation that would help to protect the knowledge of the researchers who develop these life-saving medicines.

The third pillar, enhanced leadership and governance, tries to invest in programs that support people and communities to prevent HIV and ensure that leadership at all levels is mobilised to implement the roadmap. There are several organisations that will ensure the smooth implementation of the roadmap, including NEPAD, UNAIDS, WHO, and several other UN partners.

==== COVID-19 pandemic ====
By February 2021, the COVID-19 pandemic in Africa had resulted in 3.6 million confirmed cases and 89,000 related deaths, and only 25% of African countries had adequate plans for vaccination, according to the Africa Centres for Disease Control and Prevention (Africa CDC). The pandemic has also devastated economies around the world, including in Africa.

== Culture ==
=== Symbols ===
Emblem of the African Union

The emblem of the African Union consists of a gold ribbon bearing small interlocking red rings, from which palm leaves shoot up around an outer gold circle and an inner green circle, within which is a gold representation of Africa. The red interlinked rings stand for African solidarity and the blood shed for the liberation of Africa; the palm leaves, for peace; the gold, for Africa's wealth and bright future; the green, for African hopes and aspirations. To symbolise African unity, the silhouette of Africa is drawn without internal borders.

The African Union adopted its new flag at its 14th Ordinary Session of the Assembly of Heads of State and Government taking place in Addis Ababa 2010. During the 8th African Union Summit which took place in Addis Ababa on 29 and 30 January 2007, the Heads of State and Government decided to launch a competition for the selection of a new flag for the Union. They prescribed a green background for the flag symbolising hope of Africa and stars to represent Member States.

Pursuant to this decision, the African Union Commission (AUC) organised a competition for the selection of a new flag for the African Union. The AUC received a total of 106 entries proposed by citizens of 19 African countries and 2 from the Diaspora. The proposals were then examined by a panel of experts put in place by the African Union Commission and selected from the five African regions for short listing according to the main directions given by the Heads of State and Government.

At the 13th Ordinary Session of the Assembly, the Heads of State and Government examined the report of the Panel and selected one among all the proposals. The flag is now part of the paraphernalia of the African Union and replaces the old one.

The old flag of the African Union bears a broad green horizontal stripe, a narrow band of gold, the emblem of the African Union at the centre of a broad white stripe, another narrow gold band and a final broad green stripe. Again, the green and gold symbolise Africa's hopes and aspirations as well as its wealth and bright future, and the white represents the purity of Africa's desire for friends throughout the world. The flag has led to the creation of the "national colours" of Africa of gold and green (sometimes together with white). These colours are visible in one way or another in the flags of many African nations. Together the colours green, gold, and red constitute the Pan-African colours.

The African Union has adopted the anthem "Let Us All Unite and Celebrate Together".

=== Celebration ===
Africa Day (formerly African Freedom Day and African Liberation Day) is an annual commemoration regarding the founding of the Organisation of African Unity (OAU), on 25 May 1963, and occurring on the same date of the month each year. Other celebrations include the following:

- The Fez Festival of World Sacred Music: a week-long celebration for harmony between cultures with dancing, Moroccan music, art exhibitions and films.
- The Knysna Oyster festival: held in Knysna and focused around sport, food and their oyster heritage.
- Lake of Stars Festival: three-day celebration that takes place in Lake Malawi, showcasing African music and welcoming people from around the world.
- Fête du Vodoun: also known as the Ouidah Voodoo Festival. It is centered around their rituals on voodoo temples, with entertainment that includes horse races and traditional drum performances.
- Umhlanga (ceremony): is mainly a private event for young women but on the sixth and seventh days the traditions are done publicly.
- African Border Day is celebrated annually on 7 June to promote peace, cross-border cooperation and regional and continental integration in Africa
- Marsabit Lake Turkana Cultural Festival: held in Kenya and celebrates harmony amongst tribes with their culture, singing, dancing and traditional costumes.
- Enkutatash is the word for the Ethiopian New Year in Amharic, the official language of Ethiopia. It occurs on 11 September in the Gregorian Calendar; except for the year preceding a leap year, when it occurs on 12 September.

== See also ==
- Africa Adaptation Initiative
- African Century
- African Peer Review Mechanism
- African Renaissance
- African Standby Force
- African Unification Front
- Africanisation
- Central Asian Union
- East African Federation
- Ezulwini agreement
- Friends of the African Union
- Indigenous peoples of Africa
- List of country groupings
- List of multilateral free-trade agreements
- Prevention of environmental migration
- Pan-Africanism
- Pan-African Women's Organization
- Regional organization
