= History of the African Union =

The African Union is a geo-political entity covering the entirety of the African continent. Its origin dates back to the First Congress of Independent African States, held in Accra, Ghana, from 15 to 22 April 1958. The conference aimed at forming the Africa Day (that preceded the formation of the OAU) to mark the liberation movement of the African people each year, such as to free themselves from foreign dictatorship and to unite Africa. The Organisation of African Unity (OAU), was subsequently established on 25 May 1963 followed by the African Economic Community in 1981. Critics argued that the OAU in particular did little to protect the rights and liberties of African citizens from their own political leaders, often dubbing it the "Dictators' Club".

The idea of creating the AU was revived in the mid-1990s under the leadership of Libyan head of state Muammar al-Gaddafi: the heads of state and government of the OAU issued the Sirte Declaration (named after Sirte, in Libya) on September 9, 1999 calling for the establishment of an African Union. The Declaration was followed by summits at Lomé in 2000, when the Constitutive Act of the African Union was adopted, and at Lusaka in 2001, when the plan for the implementation of the African Union was adopted. During the same period, the initiative for the establishment of the New Partnership for Africa's Development (NEPAD), was also established.

== Scramble for Africa ==
The first attempts to create a politically unified state encompassing the whole of the African continent were made by European colonial powers in the 19th century, intent on harnessing the vast natural resources and huge amount of manpower the continent had to offer to their Empires. However, the strong rivalry between European powers such as Britain, Belgium, France, Italy, Germany, Spain, and Portugal, meant the reality soon dawned that no one nation was powerful enough to outdo all the others, and take complete control of the continent.

Instead, they carved the continent up between them, scrambling for control of as much territory as possible, and attempting to prevent their rivals from obtaining favourable regions. The European powers essentially maintained control of their territories as colonies until the second half of the 20th century, when changes in European policy and thinking led to releasing of control over their African colonies, and the creation of independent nations across the continent took place between the 1950s and 1970s.

== Union of African States ==
The Union of African States, was a short lasting union of three West African states, in the 1960s - Mali, Ghana, and Guinea. This union was Marxist politically, and was led by such African revolutionaries as Kwame Nkrumah of Ghana and Sékou Touré of Guinea, who was president of Guinea.

On November 23, 1958, a Liberia Ghana-Guinea Union was formed with a flag like that of Ghana but with two black stars. In May 1959 it was announced that the Union would be renamed Union of African States with a flag like that of Ghana "with as many black stars as there were members". In April 1961 Mali joined this union, so the flag then had three stars. The Union fell apart in 1962, when Guinea started to reach out to the United States, against the acquaintance of their Socialist partner, the U.S.S.R.

== Organisation of African Unity ==
The Organisation of African Unity (OAU) or Organisation de l'Unité Africaine (OUA) was established on May 25, 1963. It was disbanded on July 9, 2002 by its last chairperson, South African President Thabo Mbeki and replaced by the African Union.

== African Economic Community ==
The African Economic Community (abbreviated AEC) is an organization of African Union states establishing grounds for mutual economic development among the majority of African states. The member states are mounting efforts to collaborate economically, but are impeded by civil wars raging in parts of Africa. The stated goals of the organization include the creation of free trade areas, customs unions, a single market, a central bank, and a common currency thus establishing an economic and monetary union.

=== Sahrawi membership, Moroccan withdrawal ===
For over 30 years, the only African state that was a UN member but not a member of the African Union was Morocco, which unilaterally withdrew from the AU's predecessor, the Organization of African Unity (OAU), in 1984, when many of the other member states supported the Sahrawi nationalist Polisario Front's Sahrawi Arab Democratic Republic. Morocco's ally, Zaire, similarly opposed the OAU's admission of the Sahrawi Arab Democratic Republic, and the Mobutu regime boycotted the organisation from 1984 to 1986. Some countries have since retracted their support for the Sahrawi Arab Democratic Republic and Morocco. Morocco rejoined the AU in 2017.

== African and Malagasy Union ==
The African and Malagasy Union (AMU) or the Union Africaine et Malgache (UAM) in French was a former intergovernmental organization created to promote cooperation among its members. The organization derives its name from the name of the continent of Africa and from the former Malagasy Republic, now Madagascar.

== Sirte Declaration ==
The Sirte Declaration was the resolution adopted by the Organisation of African Unity on September 9, 1999 at Sirte, Libya, to create the African Union.

== Constitutive Act of the African Union ==
The Constitutive Act of the African Union sets out the codified framework under which the African Union is to conduct itself. It was signed on July 11, 2000 at Lomé, Togo.

== Union launch ==
The African Union was launched in Durban on July 9, 2002 by its first president, South African, Thabo Mbeki at the first session of the Assembly of the African Union. The second session of the Assembly was in Maputo in 2003, and the third session in Addis Ababa on July 6, 2004.

== Economics and monetary union ==
A stated goal of the AU is to establish a common African currency and banking institutions.

== See also ==
- History of Africa
- Union of African States
