= Continental union =

Regional organization which facilitates pan-continental integration

A continental union is a regional organization. Continental unions vary from collaborative intergovernmental organizations, to supranational politico-economic unions. Continental unions are a relatively new type of political entity in the history of human government. Throughout most of human history, political organization has been at the local level (e.g. tribal, city state) and in more recent centuries, the sub-regional ("regional")/sub-continental level (e.g. river system/basin empires, the modern "nation-state"); however, starting with the advent of better transportation, weapons and communication there was for the first time the ability for a union of member states to organize at the continental level. After the devastation of the First and Second World Wars in the middle of the twentieth century, Europe began to slowly integrate with the founding of the "European Community", which became a political union covering much of the European continent (27 member states as of February 2023).

== Supranational unions ==
=== European Union ===
The European Union (EU) is a supranational economic and political union of 27 member states in Europe committed to integration and governance of European states and nations. The EU was established by the Treaty of Maastricht on 1 November 1993 upon the foundations of the pre-existing European Economic Community. A European Parliament has been created, directly elected by citizens of the EU. With almost 450 million citizens, the EU combined generates an estimated 30% share (US$18.4 trillion in 2008) of the nominal gross world product.

The EU has developed a single market, Economic and Monetary Union, Customs Union, through a standardised system of laws which apply in all Union territory, ensuring the free movement of people, goods, services, and capital. It maintains common policies on trade, agriculture, fisheries and regional development. Twenty member states have adopted a common currency, the euro, constituting the Eurozone. The EU has developed a limited role in foreign policy, having representation at the WTO, G8, G20 and at the UN. It enacts legislation in justice and home affairs, including the abolition of passport controls by an agreement between the member states which form the Schengen Area.

== Intergovernmental organizations ==
=== African Union ===
The African Union (AU), at a size of 29,757,900 square kilometres (11,489,589 sq mi) and a population of 1 billion, is by far the largest of the existing continental unions in terms of both land mass and population. It includes all African countries.

The African Union was formed as a successor to the Organization of African Unity (OAU). The most important decisions of the AU are made by the Assembly of the African Union, a semi-annual meeting of the heads of state and government of its member states. The AU's secretariat, the African Union Commission, is based in Addis Ababa, Ethiopia. During the February 2009 Union meeting headed by former Libyan leader Gaddafi, it was resolved that the African Union Commission would become the African Union Authority.

The African Union is made up of both political and administrative bodies. The highest decision-making organ of the African Union is the Assembly, made up of all the heads of state or government of member states of the AU. As of 2026, the Assembly is chaired by João Lourenço. The AU also has a representative body, the Pan-African Parliament, which consists of 265 members elected by the national parliaments of the AU member states. The current president of the Pan-African Parliament is Fortune Z. Charumbira. Other political institutions of the AU include the Executive Council, made up of foreign ministers, which prepares decisions for the Assembly; the Permanent Representatives Committee, made up of the ambassadors to Addis Ababa of AU member states; and the Economic, Social, and Cultural Council (ECOSOCC), a civil society consultative body.

=== Union of South American Nations ===
The Union of South American Nations (commonly referred to by its Spanish acronym UNASUR) is an intergovernmental union integrating two existing customs unions: Mercosur and the Andean Community of Nations, as part of a continuing process of South American integration. It is modeled on the European Union, and at one time included all of continental South America, except for French Guiana (which is an overseas department of France, and therefore part of the European Union). Panama and Mexico hold observer status.

The UNASUR Constitutive Treaty was signed on May 23, 2008, at the Third Summit of Heads of State, held in Brasília, Brazil. In accordance with the Treaty, the Secretariat is located in Quito, Ecuador and the seat of the planned South American Parliament is to be located in Cochabamba, Bolivia. The headquarters of the planned Bank of the South (BancoSur) were to be located in Caracas, Venezuela but have been delayed for numerous reasons.

The South American Defence Council was formed on July 20, 2008, and had its first meeting on March 10, 2009. On May 4, 2010, the Heads of State of the Member States unanimously elected former Argentine President Néstor Kirchner as the first Secretary General of UNASUR.

In early 2019, the majority of South America had left UNASUR and formed a second continental union, the Forum for the Progress and Development of South America (commonly referred to as PROSUR).

== Similar political entities ==
=== Asia Cooperation Dialogue ===
Member States of the Asia Cooperation Dialogue

The Asia Cooperation Dialogue is an intergovernmental organization created on 18 June 2002 to promote Asian cooperation at a continental level and to help integrate separate regional organizations such as the ASEAN, the Eurasian Economic Union, the Gulf Cooperation Council, and the SAARC. (Note: Turkey is a member of both the Asia Cooperation Dialogue and the Council of Europe.)

=== Council of Europe ===
Although generally not considered a traditional continental union, the Council of Europe is an intergovernmental organization that spans the majority of states considered "European". As an intergovernmental organization, the council's focus is on political dialogue relating to the upholding of human rights, democracy and the rule of law in Europe. (Note: Armenia, Azerbaijan, Cyprus, Georgia, and Turkey are members of the Council of Europe. Yet, the overwhelming majority of the territory administered by these states is traditionally considered to lie within Asia.)

=== Eurasian Economic Union ===
Member States of the Eurasian Economic Union Observer states Other candidate states

The Eurasian Economic Union was founded in January 2015, consisting of Armenia, Belarus, Kazakhstan, Kyrgyzstan, Russia and observer members Moldova, Uzbekistan, and Cuba; all of them (except Cuba) being previous constituent states of the Soviet Union. The Eurasian Union is a transcontinental union as members include states from both Europe and Asia.

=== European Political Community ===
Countries participating in the European Political Community

The European Political Community (EPC), established in 2022, is an intergovernmental forum consisting of 47 states which focuses on political and strategic discussions about the future of Europe.

=== Organization of American States ===
Although generally not considered a traditional continental union, the Organization of American States (OAS) is an intergovernmental organization that spans the majority of states considered within the Americas. As an intergovernmental organization, the OAS's focus is on political dialog relating to the purposes of regional solidarity, peace, and cooperation among the states of the Americas.

=== Pacific Islands Forum ===
Although generally not considered a traditional continental union, the Pacific Islands Forum (PIF) is an intergovernmental organization that spans the majority of independent states and dependent territories within the Pacific Ocean. As an intergovernmental organization, the PIF's focus is on political dialog relating to the enhancement of cooperation and economic and social well-being among states within the Pacific Ocean.

=== Union for the Mediterranean ===
Although generally not considered a traditional continental union, the Union for the Mediterranean is an intergovernmental organization and a transcontinental union as members include most states from Europe (including the whole European Union itself representing them with a full membership even if not all these countries are Mediterranean, and a few other European countries, notably applicants to the European Union which participate as observers), and most states bordering the Mediterranean Sea from North Africa to Western Asia (a few of them are observers, or are states whose membership is temporarily suspended).

== Geopolitical terminology ==
=== In Canadian usage ===
In Canadian history and political science, the term "Continental Union" refers to the idea of creating a union between Canada and the United States, either by forming a new, super-national body in which both countries would become equal members, or by the United States annexing Canada. The ideology which favours Canadian integration with the United States, economically or politically, is known as "continentalism", the more radical version which favours Canada becoming part of the United States is called "annexationism". Continentalism has historically been one of three theories of Canadian nationality that predominated in English Canadian thought, the others being pro-British "Imperialism", and Canadian nationalism.

Additionally, the concept of a North American Union between Canada, the United States, and Mexico has been discussed in policy and academic circles since the concluding of the North American Free Trade Agreement.

== See also ==
- Continentalism
- International organisation
- List of military alliances
- Shanghai Cooperation Organisation
- Supranational union
- Trade bloc
