= UN shuttle =

The term UN shuttle has been utilised to refer to various transport routes and conveyances (particularly commercial flights) that have been heavily used by United Nations (UN) or other international organisations' personnel and/or serve major UN centres.

A number of aviation disasters have gained attention for occurring on "UN shuttles" and thus killing, injuring and/or otherwise affecting an unusually high proportion of international diplomats, non-governmental organisation and aid workers. These include:

- Swissair Flight 111, between the biggest UN offices of New York and Geneva
- Ethiopian Airlines Flight 302, between African Union headquarters and UN regional offices in Addis Ababa and Nairobi

The term may also apply to:

- United Nations Humanitarian Air Service
- Shuttle diplomacy
