= Specialised Technical Committees of the African Union =

Technical committees of African Union

The Specialised Technical Committees are bodies in the African Union responsible to the Executive Council.

They include:

- The Specialised Technical Committee on Justice and Legal Affairs.
- The Specialised Technical Committee on Rural Economy and Agricultural Matters.
- The Specialised Technical Committee on Monetary and Financial Affairs.
- The Specialised Technical Committee on Trade, Customs and Immigration Matters.
- The Specialised Technical Committee on Industry, Science and Technology, Energy, Natural Resources and Environment.
- The Specialised Technical Committee on Transport, Communications and Tourism.
- The Specialised Technical Committee on Health, Labor and Social Affairs.
- The Specialised Technical Committee on Education, Culture and Human Resources.

The Assembly sometimes rearrange the existing Committees or create new ones. The Specialized Technical Committees are made up of Ministers or senior officials in charge of sectors within their areas of expertise.

== Functions of the Specialized Technical Committees ==
Each Committee shall within its area of work:

- Prepare projects and programs then submit them to the Executive Council.
- Ensure the supervision, follow-up and the evaluation of the implementation of decisions taken by the organs of the Union.
- Make sure the coordination of projects of the Union run smoothly.
- Submit to the Executive Council either on its own initiative or at the request of the Executive Council, reports and recommendations on the implementation of the provisions of this Act.
- Carry out any other functions assigned to it for the purpose of ensuring the implementation of the provisions of this Act.
