= Ezulwini Consensus =

Position on international relations

The Ezulwini Consensus is a position on international relations and reform of the United Nations, agreed by the African Union. It calls for a more representative and democratic Security Council, in which Africa, like all other world regions, is represented.

== Background ==
The consensus is named after Ezulwini, a valley in central Eswatini (then known as Swaziland), where the agreement was made in 2005. The consensus was then adopted at an Extraordinary Session of the Executive Council of the African Union, in March 2005, in Addis Ababa.

== Agreement ==
The agreement covered several areas, including:

=== Collective security - preventive measures ===
- Underlining the serious threats posed by HIV/AIDS, poverty, and environmental degradation
- Encouraging debts of highly indebted states to be written off
- Recommending adoption of the Lomé Declaration and Algiers Declaration on Unconstitutional Changes of Governments.
- Calling for an end to illicit manufacturing, trade, and stockpiling of small arms & light weapons (SALW).
- Recommending steps toward "complete elimination of nuclear weapons"

=== Collective security - use of force ===
- A cautious approach to the Responsibility to protect: "It is important to reiterate the obligation of states to protect their citizens, but this should not be used as a pretext to undermine the sovereignty, independence and territorial integrity of states."
- Prohibiting any use of force outside Article 51 of the UN Charter (self-defence) and Article 4h of AU (preventing genocide and serious crimes against humanity).
- Calling for the UN to fund and support peacekeeping forces provided by regional organisations such as the AU.
- Proposing a Peacebuilding Commission.

=== United Nations reform ===
- At least two permanent seats (including veto power), and five non-permanent seats on the Security Council.
- The African Union would choose which African governments get the seats.
- Further calls for ECOSOC to be strengthened.

== Sirte Declaration ==
The Ezulwini Consensus was followed by the Sirte Declaration of July 2005, which reiterated the need for at least two permanent seats and five non-permanent Security Council seats for African states.

== Related agreements ==
- Responsibility to protect
- Algiers Convention on Terrorism
- Lomé Declaration
- Algiers Declaration
