= Permanent Representatives' Committee of the African Union =

Advisory body to the Executive Council

The Permanent Representatives' Committee of the African Union (PRC) is made up of nominated representatives of member countries by the African Union.

They prepare the work for the Executive Council. The chairperson is ambassador Miguel Cesar Domingos Bembe of Angola.
