= African Energy Commission =

Specialized agency of the African Union

The African Energy Commission (AFREC) is a specialized agency of the African Union (AU), under the Department for Infrastructure and Energy, in charge of coordinating, harmonizing, protecting, conserving, developing, rational exploitation, commercializing and integrating energy resources on the African continent.

== Introduction ==
AFREC was created by Decision AHG/Dec.167 (XXXVII) of the 37th Summit of the Organisation of African Unity (OAU) African Heads of States and Governments which was held in Lusaka, Zambia, on 11 July 2001. It was launched by the African Union Ministers in charge of Energy in the meeting held on 15 – 17 February 2008 in Algiers, Algeria through the Algiers Declaration AU/EXP/EN/Decl.(III) with the aim of ensuring, coordinating and harmonizing the protection, conservation, development, rational exploitation, commercialization and integration of energy resources on the African continent.

The activities and programs of AFREC are based on AFREC Convention decided by African Heads of States and Governments, Agenda 2063, African Union Commission (AUC) Strategic Plan. As per the convention, AFREC’s mandates are broad and covers all the elements of African energy sector according to Article 3 (Guiding Principles) and Article 4 (AFREC functions) of the convention:

- Develop policies, strategies, researches and plans based on Member states, sub-regional, regional and continental development priorities and recommend their implementation
- Design, create and update an energy continental data base and facilitate rapid dissemination of information and exchange of information among Member States, sub-regional, regional and continental institution
- Provide technical support, mobilize financial and technical support, provide capacity building to the Member States, sub-regional, regional and continental institution for the energy sector

== History ==
In April 1980, the Assembly of the Organisation of African Unity (OAU) adopted the Lagos Plan of Action (LPA) in Lagos (Nigeria). In this meeting, short-, medium- and long-term actions were proposed to remedy the main energy problems of Africa. The Assembly saw the urgent need to set up an institutional framework, and hence endorsed the recommendation relating to the establishment of the AFREC.

The United Nations Development Programme (UNDP) in collaboration with OAU and ECA, carried out in 1984-1985 a study which recommended the creation of the AFREC. The recommendations of the OAU Heads of State and Government and UNDP study were reaffirmed, advocated and reiterated mainly in the treaty establishing the African Economic Community (AEC) (1991), The first Pan African Conference of Energy Ministers (1995), the Cairo Program of Action (1995), the regional conferences of ministers responsible for the development and utilization of mineral and energy resources in Africa (1997), the African Energy Program of the African Development Bank (AfDB) (1995), etc.

The General Secretariat of the OAU carried out a feasibility study with its partners such as the Regional Economic Communities, the AfDB, the World Energy Council (WEC), UPEDEA, United Nations Environment Programme (UNEP), UNDP, United Nations Department of Economic and Social Affairs (UNDESA), United Nations Industrial Development Organization (UNIDO), Food and Agriculture Organization (FAO), and UNESCO. Following these studies, the OAU adopted the report entitled "Proposal of the OAU General Secretariat on the Creation of the African Energy Commission AFREC". The OAU and the Government of the Arab Republic of Egypt organized "The African Energy Experts Meeting for the creation of the African Energy Commission" in 2000 Cairo (Egypt), that worked out and adopted a "Draft Convention of the African Energy Commission (AFREC)".

The Conference of African Energy Ministers for the creation of the AFREC was organized by the OAU and hosted by Algeria in 23 -24 April 2001. AFREC was then created by Decision AHG/Dec.167 (XXXVII) of the 37th Summit of the OAU African Heads of States and Governments which was held in Lusaka, Zambia, on 11 July 2001. It was launched by the African Union Ministers in charge of Energy in the meeting held on 15 – 17 February 2008 in Algiers, Algeria through the Algiers Declaration AU/EXP/EN/Decl (III).

== List of Executive Directors ==
Name	Nationality	Year from	Year to
Rashid Ali Abdallah	Sudan	2018	Current
Atef Marzouk	Egypt	2016	2018
Hussein Elhag	Sudan	2004	2016
Libere Buzingo	Burundi	2003	2004

== Pillars of AFREC ==
The pillars of the African Energy Commission include:

- The African Energy Information System
- The Biomass Programme
- The Energy Transition Programme
- The Energy Efficiency Programme
- The Oil and Gas Programme
- The Capacity Building Programme

== African Energy Information System ==
AFREC successfully created the first-ever Africa Energy Information System (AEIS) and database in 2012, through which the African Energy Statistics Database has been published annually. In 2017, AFREC started creation of energy efficiency indicators for residential sector and will extend to energy efficiency indicators for industrial and transport sectors.

Since 2012 AFREC has provided continuous capacity building to National Focal Points and hundreds of energy experts and statisticians so as to improve their competencies through annually organized regional training workshops (West African region and North francophone countries, East African region and North Anglophone countries, Central Africa Region, and Southern African Region). These trainings have been conducted in partnership with other energy international organisations such as the International Energy Agency (IEA) and experts from Regional Economic Communities (RECs), Regional Power Pools (RPPs), and Regional Center of Energy and Energy Efficiency.

== See also ==
- Africa CDC
