= African Border Day =

Annual celebration of African cooperation

The African Border Day is an annual event celebrated on 7 June to promote peace, cross-border cooperation and regional and continental integration in Africa.

== History ==
The African Border Day was launched as part of the African Union Border Programme (AUBP) to strengthen conflict prevention mechanisms amongst African states.

The first African Border Day celebration was held in 2011 at the African Union Headquarters in Addis Ababa, Ethiopia.
