= Third India–Africa Forum Summit =

3rd India-Africa Forum Summit
- The lion logo depicting African and Indian lion
- Host country: India
- Date: 26–29 October 2015
- Motto: Reinvigorated Partnership-Shared Vision
- Cities: New Delhi
- Venues: Indira Gandhi Arena
- Follows: 2nd India-Africa Forum Summit
- Precedes: 4th India-Africa Forum Summit
- Website: mea.gov.in/india-africa-forum-summit-2015/index.html

The Third India-Africa Forum Summit (IAFS-III) was held in New Delhi, India from 26–30 October 2015. The five-day summit started with consultations on official level followed by the head of states/governments level summit on 29 October 2015 with scheduled bilateral meetings on 30 October 2015. This is going to be India's biggest diplomatic outreach involving delegates from a large number of African nations.

== Background ==
The Summit was earlier scheduled to be held in December 2014, with a three-year gap after the 2011 Summit in Addis Ababa. But Syed Akbaruddin, the official spokesperson of Indian Foreign Ministry, told the media that the scheduled summit was postponed to 2015 and would include a higher number of African leaders unlike the previous two summits where the event was restricted to only 10–15 African countries. Although media reports claimed that Ebola outbreak in Western African nations played key role behind the postponement of the summit.

Invitations were sent out to all 54 African nations through the respective Indian missions but it was not delivered only in Libya, as there is no government functioning at the time, and the Indian embassy also had to move to Tunisia. India's Foreign Minister Sushma Swaraj herself handed over the invitation to South African President Jacob Zuma during her visit to the African country in May 2015.

== Logo ==
The logo depicts a lion with one half of an African lion and another half of an Indian lion. The official website mentioned about the logo: "Proud, Courageous, Bold and on the Prowl, ready to take on the future and seize every opportunity". In the background African map overlapping merges with Indian map in a reference to ancient Gondwanaland when Indian subcontinent used to be part of today's Africa's continental landmass millions of years ago. The India Gate, one of the iconic landmark of Delhi, the host city will be illuminated with 3D laser projection showing India-Africa shared heritage and India's contribution in African peace and prosperity, throughout the summit week.

== Participants ==
The host country, India, had sent invitations to all 54 African head of state/government and trying to ensure maximum participation at the highest level. As of September 2015, the following dignitaries were expected to attend the summit in Delhi, India.

Country	Title	Leader
African Union	Chairperson	Nkosazana Dlamini-Zuma
Algeria	Prime Minister	Abdelmalek Sellal
Angola	Vice President	Manuel Vicente
Benin	President	Yayi Boni
Botswana	Minister of Foreign Affairs	Phandu Skelemani
Burkina Faso	Minister of Foreign Affairs	Moussa Nébié
Burundi	First Vice President	Gaston Sindimwo
Cape Verde	Minister of Foreign Affairs	Jorge Homero Tolentino Araujo
Chad	President	Idriss Déby
Cameroon	Minister of Foreign Affairs	Lejeune Mbella Mbella
Central African Republic	Economic Advisor to the Ministry of Foreign Affairs	Julienne Desiree Gaudeuille
Comoros	President	Ikililou Dhoinine
Cote d'Ivoire	Minister of Industry and Mines	Brou Kasi Jean-Claude
Congo–Brazzaville	Minister of Foreign Affairs	Jean-Claude Gakosso
Djibouti	President	Ismaïl Omar Guelleh
DR Congo	Minister of Foreign Affairs	Raymond Tshibanda
Egypt	President	Abdel Fattah el-Sisi
Eritrea	Minister of Foreign Affairs	Osman Saleh
Equatorial Guinea	President	Teodoro Obiang Nguema Mbasogo
Ethiopia	Prime Minister	Hailemariam Desalegn
Gabon	President	Ali Bongo Ondimba
Gambia	Vice President	Isatou Njie-Saidy
Ghana	President	John Dramani Mahama
Guinea	President	Alpha Condé
Guinea-Bissau	President	José Mário Vaz
Kenya	President	Uhuru Kenyatta
Lesotho	Prime Minister	Pakalitha Mosisili
Liberia	President	Ellen Johnson Sirleaf
Libya	Prime Minister	Abdullah al-Thani
Madagascar	President	Hery Rajaonarimampianina
Malawi	Minister of Foreign Affairs	George Chaponda
Mali	President	Ibrahim Boubacar Keïta
Mauritania	President	Mohamed Ould Abdel Aziz
Mauritius	Prime Minister	Anerood Jugnauth
Morocco	King	Mohammed VI
Mozambique	President	Filipe Nyusi
Namibia	President	Hage Geingob
Niger	President	Mahamadou Issoufou
Nigeria	President	Muhammadu Buhari
Rwanda	Prime Minister G	Anastase Murekezi
São Tomé and Príncipe	Prime Minister	Patrice Trovoada
Senegal	President	Macky Sall
Seychelles	President	James Michel
Sierra Leone	President	Ernest Bai Koroma
Somalia	President	Hassan Sheikh Mohamud
South Africa	President	Jacob Zuma
South Sudan	President	Salva Kiir
Sudan	President	Omar Hassan Ahamed Albashir
Eswatini	King	Mswati III
Tanzania	Vice President	Mohamed Gharib Bilal
Togo	Minister of Foreign Affairs	Robert Dussey
Tunisia	Foreign Minister	Taïeb Baccouche
Uganda	President	Yoweri Museveni
Zambia	Vice President	Inonge Wina
Zimbabwe	President	Robert Mugabe
