= Geography of the African Union =

The African Union in location to the rest of the world.

The African Union covers almost the entirety of continental Africa and several off-shore islands. Consequently, it is wildly diverse, including the world's largest hot desert (the Sahara), huge tropical rainforests and savannas, and the world's longest river (the Nile).

== Overview ==
The AU presently has an area of 29,922,059 square kilometres (11,552,972 sq mi), with 24,165 square kilometres (9,330 sq mi) of coastline. The vast majority of this area is on continental Africa, while the only significant territory off the mainland is the island of Madagascar (the world's fourth largest), accounting for slightly less than 2% of the total.

== Extreme points ==
African Union at large
Northernmost	Cape Angela	Tunisia	(37°21′ N)
Southernmost	Cape Agulhas	South Africa	(34°51'15"S)
Westernmost	Santo Antão	Cape Verde	(25°25'W)
Easternmost	Rodrigues	Mauritius	(63°30'E)
Most distant point from the coastline	African pole of inaccessibility	(Central African Republic) (Democratic Republic of the Congo) (South Sudan)	near the town Obo.
Highest point above land	Mount Kilimanjaro	Tanzania	5,895 m (6,447 yd)
Lowest point below sea level	Lake Asal	Djibouti	−156 m (−171 yd)
Longest River	Nile	(Burundi) (Rwanda) (Tanzania) (Uganda) (Kenya) (Democratic Republic of the Congo) (South Sudan) (Ethiopia) (Sudan) (Egypt)	6,650 km (4,130 miles) long
Deepest Lake	Lake Tanganyika	(Tanzania) (Democratic Republic of the Congo) (Burundi) (Zambia)	1,470 m (4,820 ft) deep
Largest lake by area	Lake Victoria	(Tanzania) (Uganda) (Kenya)	68,800 km^{2} (26,600 sq mi)
Highest waterfall	Tugela Falls	South Africa	948 m (3,110 feet)
Largest Island	Madagascar Island	Madagascar	587,040 km2 (226,657 sq mi)

== Countries bordering the African Union ==
The AU has two land borders: Morocco borders the Spanish semi-enclaves of Ceuta, Melilla, and Peñón de Vélez de la Gomera and Egypt's Sinai Peninsula borders the Gaza Strip for 11 km (6.8 mi) and Israel for 400 km (248 mi) on its western frontier. Since it is Asian, the Sinai is the only territorial region of the AU on another geopolitical continent.

=== Previous borders ===
OAU member states by the decade they joined.

The AU is the successor to the Organisation of African Unity, an international organization that gradually included sovereign African states as the continent was decolonized. The membership of the African Union, and consequently its borders, have not changed since its founding.

==== Founding of the OAU: May 25 – December 13, 1963 ====
- The Gambia – Surrounded by Senegal.
- Guinea-Bissau – A dependent area of Portugal, joined on November 19, 1973, prior to internationally recognized independence, bordering Guinea to the east and south, and Senegal to the north.
- Kenya – A colony of the United Kingdom at the time, Kenya joined on December 13, 1963, the day after its independence. It is bordered by Ethiopia to the north, Somalia to the east, Tanzania to the south, Uganda to the west, and Sudan to the northwest.
- Malawi – A colony of the United Kingdom at the time, Malawi joined on July 13, 1964, one week after independence.
- Portugal – At the time, Angola was a province, with the Democratic Republic of the Congo to its north; the Cabinda enclave is surrounded by the Republic of the Congo to its north and the Democratic Republic of the Congo on its east and south. Angola joined on February 11, 1975, prior to its internationally recognized independence.
- Spain – Enclaves of Ceuta and Melilla are surrounded by Morocco; Spanish Sahara was a province at the time, to the south. Equatorial Guinea was also a province, bordering Cameroon to the north and Gabon to the east and south.
- Zambia – A colony of the United Kingdom at the time, Zambia joined the AU in October, 1965, after gaining independence on October 24, the year prior. The Democratic Republic of the Congo and Tanzania lie to the north.

==== December 13, 1963 – July 13, 1964 ====
- Kenya joins the OAU.

==== July 13 – December 16, 1964 ====
- Malawi joins the OAU.

==== December 16, 1964 – October 1965 ====
- Zambia joins the OAU. It bordered the following territories to the south:
- Botswana – A colony of the United Kingdom at the time, Botswana joined the OAU on October 31, 1966; it achieved independence the September 30 prior.
- South West Africa – A colony of the United Kingdom under the mandate of South Africa, the territory wouldn't become independent until March 21, 1990, as Namibia. It joined the OAU in June of that year.
- Zimbabwe – A colony of the United Kingdom at the time, Zimbabwe joined the OAU in June, 1980; it achieved independence as Rhodesia on November 11, 1965.

==== October 31, 1965 ====
- The Gambia joins the OAU.

==== October 31, 1966 – July 13, 1964 ====
- Botswana and Lesotho join the OAU. The bordered:
- South Africa – While independent, South Africa was ruled under the system of apartheid, and was ineligible and uninterested in membership. Following a democratic revolution in 1994, it joined the OAU that June 6; becoming the most recent member. It bordered Botswana to the south and is perforated by Lesotho.

==== August 1968 – September 24, 1968 ====
- Mauritius joins the OAU.

==== September 24, 1968 – October 12, 1968 ====
- Swaziland joins the OAU.

==== October 12, 1968 – November 19, 1973 ====
- Equatorial Guinea joins the OAU upon independence. The OAU still shares a border with Spain along Ceuta and Melilla (via Morocco), and Spanish Sahara (via Algeria, Mauritania, and Morocco.)

==== November 19, 1973 – February 11, 1975 ====
- Guinea-Bissau joins the OAU. At the time, it was still considered a dependency of Portugal. It gained independence on September 10, 1974.

==== February 11 – July 18, 1975 ====
- Angola joins the OAU. At the time, it was still considered a dependency of Portugal. It gained independence on November 11, 1975.

==== July 18 – February 27, 1976 ====
Cape Verde, Comoros, Mozambique, and São Tomé and Príncipe join the OAU.

==== February 27 – June 29, 1976 ====
- The Sahrawi Arab Democratic Republic is declared in Western Sahara as Spain decolonizes. This leads to a land war between the Sahrawi nationalist Polisario Front and the armies of Mauritania and Morocco.

==== June 29, 1976 – June 27, 1977 ====
- Seychelles joins the OAU.

==== June 27, 1977 – June 1980 ====
- Djibouti becomes independent of France and joins the OAU.

==== June 1980 – February 22, 1982 ====
Zimbabwe joins the OAU.

==== February 22, 1982 – November 12, 1984 ====
- The Sahrawi Arab Democratic Republic joins the OAU. It does not participate in the next two summits, due to pressure from Morocco.

==== November 12, 1984 – March 21, 1990 ====
- Morocco leaves the OAU; leaving no border with Spain.

==== March 21 – June 1990 ====
- Namibia becomes independent of the South African mandate.

==== June 1990 – May 24, 1993 ====
- Namibia joins the OAU.

==== May 24, 1993 – June 6, 1994 ====
- Eritrea becomes independent from Ethiopia and joins the OAU.

==== June 6, 1994 – 2011 ====
- South Africa joins the OAU after the fall of apartheid.

==== 2011 – January 30, 2017 ====
- South Sudan joins the African Union after becoming an independent state following a referendum.

==== January 30, 2017 – present ====
- Morocco readmitted, moving the border to Spain.
