= African Union Convention on Preventing and Combating Corruption =

The African Union Convention on Preventing and Combating Corruption (AUCPCC) was adopted in Maputo on 11 July 2003 to fight rampant political corruption on the African continent. It represents regional consensus on what African states should do in the areas of prevention, criminalization, international cooperation and asset recovery. Going beyond other similar conventions, the AUCPCC calls for the eradication of corruption in the private and public sector. The Convention covers a wide range of offences including bribery (domestic or foreign), diversion of property by public officials, trading in influence, illicit enrichment, money laundering and concealment of property and primarily consists of mandatory provisions. It also obliges the signatories to introduce open and converted investigations against corruption. Those measures attracted criticism in the Journal of African Law, where Peter Schroth argued that the convention disregards other aspects of the rule of law, like e.g. data protection and the presumption of innocence.

In 2007, it was reported that the following nine countries had legal gaps relating to this Convention and United Nations Convention against Corruption.: Algeria, Burundi, Kenya, Liberia, Nigeria, Sierra Leone, South Africa, Togo, and Uganda.

As at 1 January 2020, the treaty was ratified by 43 States and signed by 49.

== Sources ==
- Hatchard, John (2014). Combating corruption : legal approaches to supporting good governance and integrity in Africa. Edward Elgar Publishing. ISBN 9781781004364. LCCN 2013949805.
