= African Union Conference Center and Office Complex =

Building in Addis Ababa, Ethiopia

- Alternative names: African Union Headquarters

General information
- Location: Addis Ababa, Ethiopia
- Coordinates: 09°00′00″N 38°44′39″E
- Current tenants: Seat of the African Union
- Construction started: 2009
- Completed: 2012
- Inaugurated: 28 January 2012
- Cost: $200 million

Height
- Height: 99.9 m (328 ft)

Technical details
- Floor area: 112,000 m^{2} (1,210,000 sq ft)

Design and construction
- Architects: China Architecture and Design Research Group
- Other designers: Tongji University
- Main contractor: China State Construction Engineering

The African Union Conference Center and Office Complex (AUCC) is a building in Addis Ababa, Ethiopia. It is the headquarters of the African Union and plays host to the biannual AU summits. It also serves as a conference center for African and diaspora businesses. The main building is 99.9 m (328 ft) tall and it is the second tallest building in Addis Ababa. Its cost was US$200 million, and it was mainly funded by the Chinese government.

== Construction ==
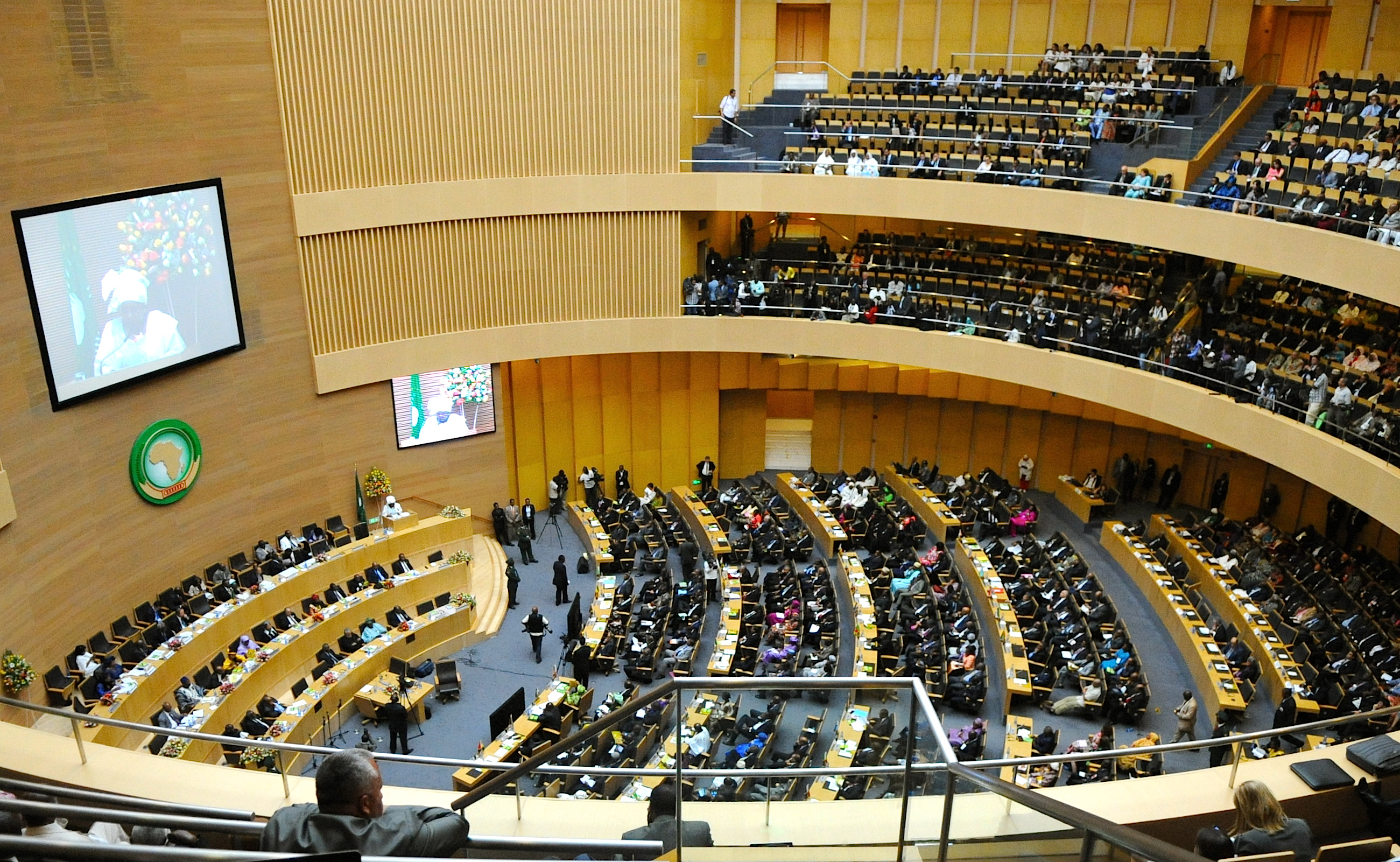
The main hall of the AUCC. The wooden veneer on the walls was imported from China.

The main building was designed and built by a collaboration of Tongji University, China State Construction Engineering and the China Architecture and Design Research Group, with the US$200 million budget donated by the Chinese government. The design of the site resembles two hands in embrace, symbolising Africa–China relations, and includes both traditional African art and modern pan-African symbology, with the height of the 99.9 m (328 ft) main tower a reference to the adoption of the Sirte Declaration founding the African Union on 9 September 1999. However, the majority of materials used in the construction were Chinese, and the art on the walls was produced in China. Construction took three years with a workforce of 1,200, roughly half of whom were Ethiopian and half of whom were Chinese. The building was inaugurated on 28 January 2012.

The headquarters of the AU Peace and Security Council, part of the AUCC compound, were built separately as a €30 million gift from the German government, under the auspices of the Deutsche Gesellschaft für Internationale Zusammenarbeit, and opened in October 2016. Unlike the main AUCC building, the Peace and Security Building was constructed by Ethiopian contractors using local materials.

The AUCC is built on the site of the former Alem Bekagn prison, used during the Italian occupation of Ethiopia, and subsequently by Haile Selassie and Mengistu Haile Mariam to house political prisoners. The decision to construct the AU headquarters on this former prison grounds was criticized by survivors, as they were disappointed by the AU's lack of acknowledgement of the torture used on the site.

== Facilities ==
The office tower of the AUCC

The headquarters comprise a 20-story office building, housing the administrative departments of the African Union Commission; a 2,505-person-capacity plenary chamber; and a sub-conference building with 32 conference rooms. Both the AUCC and the Peace and Security Building are designed to be environmentally-friendly, using passive cooling to control the buildings' climates in the heat of Addis Ababa without high energy consumption. The complex also contains the African Union Grand Hotel, funded by the Ethiopian-Saudi billionaire Mohammed Hussein Al Amoudi and managed by Westin, which is primarily for hosting presidents and diplomats during AU summits.

== Espionage allegations ==
In January 2018, six years after the opening of the AUCC, a report in the African edition of Le Monde, confirmed by the Financial Times, claimed that the AU's IT department had discovered in early 2017 that the site's computer systems were connecting nightly to servers in Shanghai and uploading AU files as well as recordings from microphones embedded in the walls and furniture. The building's computer system was subsequently removed and the AU refused a Chinese offer to configure the replacement system. Le Monde alleged that the AU had then covered up the hack to protect Chinese interests in the continent.

Huawei denied any claims of impropriety. The Chinese government denied that they bugged the building, with China's ambassador to the AU, Kuang Weilin, calling the article "ridiculous and preposterous" and that the allegations were intended to put pressure between Beijing and the continent. Ethiopian Prime Minister Hailemariam Desalegn said that he did not believe the French media report. Moussa Faki Mahamat, head of the African Union Commission, said the allegations in the Le Monde's report were false. "These are totally false allegations and I believe that we are completely disregarding them." Incoming Chairperson of the African Union Paul Kagame said he did not know anything about it. Following the allegations, the African Union signed a further Memorandum of Understanding (MOU)s to expand their technology partnership with Huawei in February 2022.

=== Commentary ===
Writing in 2024, academics Christopher Foster et al. note that the allegations generated more interest in the global north countries than in Africa.

== See also ==
- Foreign relations of the African Union
- Africa Hall, permanent headquarters of UNECA in Addis Ababa
- Headquarters of the United Nations
- Palace of Nations, former seat of the League of Nations
- Secretariat of the Caribbean Community
