= Constitutive Act of the African Union =

Treaty

The Constitutive Act of the African Union sets out the codified framework under which the African Union is to conduct itself. It was signed on 11 July 2000 at Lomé, Togo. It entered into force after two thirds of the 53 signatory states ratified the convention on 26 May 2001. When a state ratifies the Constitutive Act, it formally becomes a member of the AU. All 55 signatory states have ratified the document, with South Sudan and Morocco ratifying as the last African states.

== Aims ==
The objectives of the AU laid down in the Act are the following:

1. To achieve greater unity, cohesion and solidarity between the African countries and African nations.
2. To defend the sovereignty, territorial integrity and independence of its Member States.
3. To accelerate the political and social-economic integration of the continent.
4. To promote and defend African common positions on issues of interest to the continent and its peoples.
5. To encourage international cooperation, taking due account of the Charter of the United Nations and the Universal Declaration of Human Rights.
6. To promote peace, security, and stability on the continent.
7. To promote democratic principles and institutions, popular participation and good governance.
8. To promote and protect human and peoples' rights in accordance with the African Charter on Human and Peoples' Rights and other relevant human rights instruments.
9. To establish the necessary conditions which enable the continent to play its rightful role in the global economy and in international negotiations.
10. To promote sustainable development at the economic, social and cultural levels as well as the integration of African economies.
11. To promote co-operation in all fields of human activity to raise the living standards of African peoples.
12. To coordinate and harmonise the policies between the existing and future Regional Economic Communities for the gradual attainment of the objectives of the Union.
13. To advance the development of the continent by promoting research in all fields, in particular in science and technology.
14. To work with relevant international partners in the eradication of preventable diseases and the promotion of good health on the continent.

== See also ==
- Sirte Declaration, 9 September 1999, resolving to create the African Union.
