= Executive Council of the African Union =

Council of ministers designated by the governments of member countries

The Executive Council Union African Union, formally the Executive Council of Ministers of the Union, is one of the seven institutions of the African Union as described in the Constitutive Act of the African Union.

According to the Constitutive Act, the Executive Council is subordinate to the Assembly of the African Union. Somewhat akin to the European Council, the Council elects members to the Commission of the African Union, which is the Union's executive branch. Despite its name, the Executive Council has no executive power. Instead, the Council executes its policy through the Commission and various executive branches of its members states.

The Executive Council is constitutionally responsible for the following policy areas.

- foreign trade;
- energy, industry and mineral resources;
- food, agricultural and animal resources, livestock production
- forestry;
- water resources and irrigation;
- environmental protection, humanitarian action and disaster response and relief;
- transport and communications;
- insurance;
- education, culture, health and human resources development;
- science and technology;
- nationality, residency and immigration matters;
- social security, including the formulation of mother and child care policies, as well as policies relating to disabled people and
- the handicapped;
- establishment of a system of African awards, medals and prizes.

== Functions ==
The Executive Council’s core functions include:

- Preparing the Assembly session agendas and drafting decisions for its consideration,
- Electing the Members of the Commission for appointment by the Assembly,
- Promoting cooperation and coordination with the Regional Economic Communities (RECs), African Development Bank (AfDB), other African institutions and the UN Economic Commission for Africa (UNECA),
- Determining policies for cooperation between the AU and Africa’s partners,
- Considering and making recommendations to the Assembly on the Commission’s structure, functions and statutes,
- Ensuring the promotion of gender equality in all AU programmes.

== Decisions of the Executive Council ==
- The Executive Council shall take its decisions by consensus or, failing which, by a two-thirds majority of the Member States. However, procedural matters, including the question of whether a matter is one of procedure or not, shall be decided by a simple majority.
- Two-thirds of the total membership of the Union shall form a quorum at any meeting of the Executive Council.
