= Sirte Declaration =

1999 declaration to form the African Union

The Sirte Declaration was the resolution adopted by the Organisation of African Unity on 9 September 1999, at the fourth Extraordinary Session of the OAU Assembly of African Heads of State and Government held at Sirte, Libya. The Declaration announced decisions to:

- establish the African Union
- speed up the implementation of the provisions of the Abuja Treaty, to create an African Economic Community, African Central Bank, African Monetary Union, African Court of Justice and Pan-African Parliament, with the Parliament to be established by 2000
- prepare a Constitutive Act of the African Union that can be ratified by 31 December 2000 and become effective the following year
- give President Abdelaziz Bouteflika of Algeria and President Thabo Mbeki of South Africa a mandate to negotiate for the cancellation of the African indebtedness
- convene an African Ministerial Conference on security, stability, development and co-operation

The Declaration was followed by summits at Lomé in 2000, when the Constitutive Act of the African Union was adopted, and at Lusaka in 2001, when the plan for the implementation of the African Union was adopted. The first session of the Assembly of the African Union was held in Durban on 9 July 2002.

The inaugural session of the Pan-African Parliament was held in March 2004.

== See also ==
- African Union
- Organisation of African Unity
- Great Socialist People's Libyan Arab Jamahiriya
