= List of heads of state and government who were later imprisoned =

There have been several individuals throughout history who served as head of state or head of government (such as president, prime minister or monarch) of their nation states and later became prisoners. Any serving or former head who was placed under house arrest, overthrown in a coup or became a prisoner of war is also included. Leaders who were kidnapped by insurgents or those who received an Interpol notice that was not consummated are not included.

== Africa ==
Portrait	Name	Countries	Official position	Later imprisonment	Reason
	Muhammad VIII al-Amin	Tunisia	Bey of Tunis (1943–1956) & King of Tunisia (1956–1957)	1957	Overthrown
	Patrice Lumumba	Democratic Republic of the Congo	Prime Minister of the Republic of the Congo (1960)	1961	Overthrown (Executed by firing squad)
	Ahmed Ben Bella	Algeria	President of Algeria (1963–1965)	1965	Overthrown
	Ntare V of Burundi	Burundi	King of Burundi (1966)	1966	Overthrown
	Alphonse Massamba-Débat	Republic of the Congo	President of the Republic of the Congo (1963–1968)	1968	Overthrown (Executed by firing squad)
	Modibo Keïta	Mali	President of Mali (1960–1968)	1968	Overthrown
	Idris of Libya	Libya	King of Libya (1951–1969)	1969	Overthrown
	Hamani Diori	Niger	President of Niger (1960–1974)	1974	Overthrown
	Haile Selassie	Ethiopia	Emperor of Ethiopia (1930–1974)	1974	Overthrown
	Moktar Ould Daddah	Mauritania	President of Mauritania (1960–1978)	1978	Overthrown
	Ali Soilih	Comoros	Head of State of the Comoros (1976–1978)	1978	Overthrown (Executed by firing squad)
	Ignatius Kutu Acheampong	Ghana	Head of state of Ghana (1972–1978)	1979	Overthrown (Executed by firing squad)
	Akwasi Afrifa	Ghana	Head of state of Ghana (1969–1970)	1979	Overthrown (Executed by firing squad)
	Fred Akuffo	Ghana	Head of state of Ghana (1978–1979)	1979	Overthrown (Executed by firing squad)
	Francisco Macías Nguema	Equatorial Guinea	President of Equatorial Guinea (1968–1979)	1979	Overthrown (Executed by firing squad)
	Luís Cabral	Guinea-Bissau	President of Guinea-Bissau (1973–1980)	1980	Overthrown
	Mohamed Khouna Ould Haidalla	Mauritania	President of Mauritania (1980–1984)	1984	Colluding with a foreign power
	Jean-Bédel Bokassa	Central African Republic	President of the Central African Republic (1966–1976); Emperor of Central Africa (1976–1979)	1987	Murder
	Mengistu Haile Mariam	Ethiopia	President of Ethiopia (1987–1991)	1991	Overthrown
	Moussa Traoré	Mali	President of Mali (1968–1991)	1993	Overthrown
	Jean Kambanda	Rwanda	Prime Minister of Rwanda (1994)	1998	Crimes against humanity
	Canaan Banana	Zimbabwe	President of Zimbabwe (1980–1987)	1999	Homosexuality
	João Bernardo Vieira	Guinea-Bissau	President of Guinea-Bissau (1980–1984, 1984–1999, 2005–2009)	1999	Overthrown
	Kumba Ialá	Guinea-Bissau	President of Guinea-Bissau (2000–2003)	2003	Overthrown
	Pasteur Bizimungu	Rwanda	President of Rwanda (1994–2000)	2004	Corruption
	Maaouya Ould Sid'Ahmed Taya	Mauritania	President of Mauritania (1984–2005)	2005	Overthrown
	Miguel Abia Biteo Boricó	Equatorial Guinea	Prime Minister of Equatorial Guinea (2004–2006)	2007	Corruption
	Sidi Ould Cheikh Abdallahi	Mauritania	President of Mauritania (2007–2008)	2008	Overthrown
	Mohamed Bacar	State of Anjouan	President of Anjouan (2001–2008)	2008	Illegally entering a country
	Marc Ravalomanana	Madagascar	President of Madagascar (2005–2009)	2010	Murder
	Mamadou Tandja	Niger	President of Niger (1999–2010)	2010	Overthrown
	Eugène Koffi Adoboli	Togo	Prime Minister of Togo (1999–2000)	2011	Corruption
	Abuzed Omar Dorda	Libya	Prime Minister of Libya (1990–1994)	2011	Crimes against humanity
	Baghdadi Mahmudi	Libya	Secretary of the General People's Committee of Libya (2006–2011)	2011	Illegally entering a country
	Muammar Gaddafi	Libya	Brotherly Leader and Guide of the Revolution (1979–2011) & Chairman of the Revolutionary Command Council (1969–1977)	2011	Overthrown
	Hosni Mubarak	Egypt	President of Egypt (1981–2011)	2011	Overthrown
	Zine El Abidine Ben Ali	Tunisia	President of Tunisia (1987–2011)	2011	Overthrown
	Charles Taylor	Liberia	President of Liberia (1997–2003)	2012	Crimes against humanity
	Raimundo Pereira	Guinea-Bissau	President of Guinea-Bissau (2009, 2012)	2012	Overthrown
	François Bozizé	Central African Republic	President of the Central African Republic (2003–2013)	2013	Overthrown
	Ephraïm Inoni	Cameroon	Prime Minister of Cameroon (2004–2009)	2013	Corruption
	Mohamed Morsi	Egypt	President of Egypt (2012–2013)	2013	Overthrown
	Hissène Habré	Chad	President of Chad (1982–1990)	2016	Crimes against humanity
	Robert Mugabe	Zimbabwe	Prime Minister of Zimbabwe (1980–1987); President of Zimbabwe (1987–2017)	2017	Overthrown
	Hama Amadou	Niger	Prime Minister of Niger (1995–1996 & 2000–2007)	2017	Child smuggling
	Ahmed Abdallah Mohamed Sambi	Comoros	President of the Comoros (2006–2011)	2018	Corruption
	Youcef Yousfi	Algeria	Prime Minister of Algeria (2014)	2019	Corruption
	Abdelmalek Sellal	Algeria	Prime Minister of Algeria (2012–2017)	2019	Corruption
	Ahmed Ouyahia	Algeria	Prime Minister of Algeria (1995–1998, 2003–2006, 2008–2012 & 2017–2019)	2019	Corruption
	Mohamed Tahir Ayala	Sudan	Prime Minister of Sudan (2019)	2019	Overthrown
	Omar al-Bashir	Sudan	President of Sudan (1989–2019)	2019	Overthrown
	Guillaume Soro	Ivory Coast	Prime Minister of the Ivory Coast (2007–2012)	2020	Corruption
	Tom Thabane	Lesotho	Prime Minister of Lesotho (2012–2015 & 2017–2020)	2020	Murder
	Ibrahim Boubacar Keïta	Mali	President of Mali (2013–2020)	2020	Overthrown
	Pierre Habumuremyi	Rwanda	Prime Minister of Rwanda (2011–2014)	2020	Fraud
	Bah Ndaw	Mali	President of Mali (2020–2021)	2021	Overthrown
	Moctar Ouane	Mali	Prime Minister of Mali (2020–2021)	2021	Overthrown
	Mohamed Ould Abdel Aziz	Mauritania	President of Mauritania (2009–2019)	2021	Corruption
	Yahya Ould Hademine	Mauritania	Prime Minister of Mauritania (2014–2018)	2021	Corruption
	Mohamed Salem Ould Béchir	Mauritania	Prime Minister of Mauritania (2018–2019)	2021	Corruption
	Jacob Zuma	South Africa	President of South Africa (2009–2018)	2021	Corruption
	Alpha Condé	Guinea	President of Guinea (2010–2021)	2021	Overthrown
	Roch Marc Christian Kaboré	Burkina Faso	President of Burkina Faso (2015–2022)	2022	Overthrown
	Moussa Dadis Camara	Guinea	President of Guinea (2008–2010)	2022	Imprisoned before trial
	Paul-Henri Sandaogo Damiba	Burkina Faso	President of Burkina Faso (2022)	2022	Overthrown
	Ibrahima Kassory Fofana	Guinea	Prime Minister of Guinea (2018–2021)	2022	Embezzlement
	Blaise Compaoré	Burkina Faso	President of Burkina Faso (1987–2014)	2022	Murder
	Alain-Guillaume Bunyoni	Burundi	Prime Minister of Burundi (2020–2022)	2023	Attempted coup
	Noureddine Bedoui	Algeria	Prime Minister of Algeria (2019)	2023	Corruption
	Mohamed Bazoum	Niger	President of Niger (2021–2023)	2023	Overthrown
	Ali Bongo Ondimba	Gabon	President of Gabon (2009–2023)	2023	Overthrown
	Ali Laarayedh	Tunisia	Prime Minister of Tunisia (2013–2014)	2025	Terrorism
	Youssef Chahed	Tunisia	Prime Minister of Tunisia (2016–2020)	2025	Terrorism
	Matata Ponyo Mapon	Democratic Republic of the Congo	Prime Minister of the Democratic Republic of the Congo (2012–2016)	2025	Corruption

== Asia ==
Portrait	Name	Countries	Official position	Later imprisonment	Reason
	Li Si	China	Imperial Chancellor (208 BC)	208 BC	Treason (Executed by Waist chop)
	Zhao Gao	China	Imperial Chancellor (208–207 BC)	207 BC	Overthrown (Stabbed to death)
	Ziying of Qin	China	Ruler of Qin (207 BC)	206 BC	Overthrown (Executed by beheading)
	Huai of Jin	China	Emperor of China (Western Jin) (307–311)	313	Overthrown (Executed by beheading)
	Min of Jin	China	Emperor of China (Western Jin) (313–316)	318	Overthrown (Executed by beheading)
	Tianzuo of Liao	China	Emperor of the Liao Dynasty (1101–1125)	1156	Overthrown (Executed by being shot to death with arrows)
	Qinzong of Song	China	Emperor of the Song Dynasty (1126–1127)	1127	Captured by enemy forces during the Jingkang incident
	Wen Tianxiang	China	Grand Chancellor of the Song Dynasty (1275–1278)	1283	Treason (Executed by beheading)
	Puyi	China	Emperor of Manchukuo (1934–1945) and Emperor of China (1908–1912)	1946	Crimes against humanity
	Chen Gongbo	Collaborationist China	President of the Republic of China (1944–1945)	1946	Treason (Executed by firing squad)
	Liang Hongzhi	Collaborationist China	President of the Reformed Government of the Republic of China (1938–1940)	1946	Treason (Executed by firing squad)
	Kōki Hirota	Japan	Prime Minister of Japan (1936–1937)	1946	Crimes against humanity (Executed by hanging)
	Hiranuma Kiichirō	Japan	Prime Minister of Japan (1939)	1946	Crimes against humanity
	Kuniaki Koiso	Japan	Prime Minister of Japan (1944–1945)	1946	Crimes against humanity
	Masaharu Homma	Japan	Military Governor of Japan to the Philippines (1942)	1946	Crimes against humanity (Executed by firing squad)
	Shigenori Kuroda	Japan	Military Governor of Japan to the Philippines (1943–1944)	1946	Crimes against humanity
	Tomoyuki Yamashita	Japan	Military Governor of Japan to the Philippines (1944–1945)	1946	Crimes against humanity (Executed by hanging)
	Jirō Minami	Japan	Governor-General of Korea (1936–1942)	1946	Crimes against humanity
	Takashi Sakai	Japan	Governor of Hong Kong (1941–1942)	1946	Crimes against humanity (Executed by firing squad)
	Rensuke Isogai	Japan	Governor of Hong Kong (1942–1944)	1946	Crimes against humanity
	Hisakazu Tanaka	Japan	Governor of Hong Kong (1945)	1947	Crimes against humanity (Executed by firing squad)
	Yoshijirō Umezu	Japan	Governor-General of Kwantung (1939–1944)	1948	Crimes against humanity
	Heitarō Kimura	Japan	Governor of Hong Kong (1944–1945)	1948	Crimes against humanity (Executed by hanging)
	Hideki Tojo	Japan	Prime Minister of Japan (1941–1944)	1948	Crimes against humanity (Executed by hanging)
	Faisal II of Iraq	Iraq	King of Iraq (1939–1958)	1958	Overthrown (Executed by firing squad)
	Nuri al-Said	Iraq	Prime Minister of Iraq (1930–1958)	1958	Overthrown (Executed by firing squad)
	Adnan Menderes	Turkey	Prime Minister of Turkey (1950–1960)	1960	Treason (Executed by hanging)
	Celâl Bayar	Turkey	President of Turkey (1950-1960)	1960	Treason
	Abd al-Karim Qasim	Iraq	Prime Minister of Iraq (1958–1963)	1963	Overthrown (Executed by firing squad)
	Sukarno	Indonesia	President of Indonesia (1945–1967)	1967	Overthrown
	Liu Shaoqi	China	Chairman of the People's Republic of China (1958–1968)	1968	Treason
	Said bin Taimur	Oman	Sultan of Oman (1932–1970)	1970	Overthrown
	Tajuddin Ahmad	Bangladesh	Prime Minister of Bangladesh (1971–1972)	1975	Overthrown (Executed by firing squad)
	Muhammad Mansur Ali	Bangladesh	Prime Minister of Bangladesh (1975)	1975	Overthrown (Executed by firing squad)
	Khondaker Mostaq Ahmad	Bangladesh	President of Bangladesh (1975)	1975	Overthrown
	Amir-Abbas Hoveyda	Iran	Prime Minister of Iran (1965–1977)	1979	Overthrown (Executed by firing squad)
	Mohammad Reza Pahlavi	Iran	Shah of Iran (1941–1979)	1979	Overthrown
	Zulfikar Ali Bhutto	Pakistan	President of Pakistan (1971–1973); Prime Minister of Pakistan (1973–1977)	1979	Murder (Hanging)
	Kakuei Tanaka	Japan	Prime Minister of Japan (1972–1974)	1983	Bribery
	Zhao Ziyang	China	General Secretary of the Chinese Communist Party (1987–1989); Premier of the People's Republic of China (1980–1987)	1989	Politically purged
	Hussain Muhammad Ershad	Bangladesh	President of Bangladesh (1983–1990)	1990	Corruption
	Mohammad Najibullah	Afghanistan	President of Afghanistan (1987–1992)	1992	Overthrown (Tortured to death)
	Tursunbek Chyngyshev	Kyrgyzstan	Prime Minister of Kyrgyzstan (1992–1993)	1994	Corruption
	Chun Doo-hwan	South Korea	President of South Korea (1980-1988)	1996	Treason
	Roh Tae-woo	South Korea	President of South Korea (1988–1993)	1996	Treason
	Akezhan Kazhegeldin	Kazakhstan	Prime Minister of Kazakhstan (1994–1997)	1998	Tax evasion
	Necmettin Erbakan	Turkey	Prime Minister of Turkey (1996–1997)	1998	Corruption
	Benazir Bhutto	Pakistan	Prime Minister of Pakistan (1988–1990 & 1993–1996)	1999	Corruption
	P. V. Narasimha Rao	India	Prime Minister of India (1991–1996)	2000	Corruption
	Suharto	Indonesia	President of Indonesia (1968–1998)	2000	Corruption
	Ne Win	Burma	Prime Minister of Burma (1958–1960 & 1962–1974); President of Burma (1974–1981)	2002	Treason
	Mohammed Hamza Zubeidi	Iraq	Prime Minister of Iraq (1991–1993)	2003	Overthrown
	Sa'dun Hammadi	Iraq	Prime Minister of Iraq (1991)	2003	Overthrown
	Saddam Hussein	Iraq	President of Iraq (1979–2003)	2003	Overthrown (Executed by hanging)
	Khin Nyunt	Burma	Prime Minister of Myanmar (2003–2004)	2005	Corruption
	Joseph Estrada	Philippines	President of the Philippines (1998–2001)	2007	Corruption
	Norodom Ranariddh	Cambodia	Prime Minister of Cambodia (1993–1997)	2007	Corruption
	Chen Shui-bian	Taiwan	President of the Republic of China (2000–2008)	2009	Bribery
	Abdul Kabir	Afghanistan	Acting Prime Minister of Afghanistan (2001, 2023)	2010	Terrorism
	Moshe Katsav	Israel	President of Israel (2000-2007)	2011	Rape
	Gloria Macapagal Arroyo	Philippines	President of the Philippines (2001–2010)	2011	Hospital arrest. Election fraud charges, later dismissed
	Gloria Macapagal Arroyo	Philippines	President of the Philippines (2001–2010)	2012	Hospital arrest. Corruption charges, later dismissed
	Yousaf Raza Gillani	Pakistan	Prime Minister of Pakistan (2008–2012)	2012	Contempt of court
	Nambaryn Enkhbayar	Mongolia	Prime Minister of Mongolia (2000–2004); President of Mongolia (2005–2009)	2012	Corruption
	Abdumalik Abdullajanov	Tajikistan	Prime Minister of Tajikistan (1992–1993)	2013	Attempted assassination
	Daniar Usenov	Kyrgyzstan	Prime Minister of Kyrgyzstan (2009–2010)	2013	Corruption
	Ehud Olmert	Israel	Prime Minister of Israel (2006-2009)	2014	Bribery
	Raja Pervaiz Ashraf	Pakistan	Prime Minister of Pakistan (2012–2013)	2014	Corruption
	Khieu Samphan	Democratic Kampuchea	Chairman of the State Presidium of Democratic Kampuchea (1976–1979)	2014	Crimes against humanity
	Nuon Chea	Democratic Kampuchea	Prime Minister of Kampuchea (1976)	2014	Crimes against humanity
	Kenan Evren	Turkey	President of Turkey (1980–1989)	2014	Treason
	Serik Akhmetov	Kazakhstan	Prime Minister of Kazakhstan (2012–2014)	2015	Corruption
	Han Myeong-sook	South Korea	Prime Minister of South Korea (2006–2007)	2015	Bribery
	Mohamed Nasheed	Maldives	President of the Maldives (2008-2012)	2015	Terrorism
	Lee Wan-koo	South Korea	Prime Minister of South Korea (2015)	2016	Bribery
	Igor Chudinov	Kyrgyzstan	Prime Minister of Kyrgyzstan (2007–2009)	2017	Corruption
	Yingluck Shinawatra	Thailand	Prime Minister of Thailand (2011–2014)	2017	Corruption
	Choi Kyoung-hwan	South Korea	Prime Minister of South Korea (2015)	2018	Bribery
	Chimediin Saikhanbileg	Mongolia	Prime Minister of Mongolia (2014–2016)	2018	Corruption
	Sanjaagiin Bayar	Mongolia	Prime Minister of Mongolia (2007–2009)	2018	Corruption
	Almazbek Atambayev	Kyrgyzstan	President of Kyrgyzstan (2011–2017)	2018	Murder
	Maumoon Abdul Gayoom	Maldives	President of the Maldives (1978–2008)	2018	Treason
	Lee Myung-bak	South Korea	President of South Korea (2008–2013)	2018	Bribery
	Park Geun-hye	South Korea	President of South Korea (2013–2017)	2018	Bribery
	Khaleda Zia	Bangladesh	Prime Minister of Bangladesh (1991–1996 & 2001–2006)	2018	Corruption
	Nawaz Sharif	Pakistan	Prime Minister of Pakistan (1990–1993, 1997–1999 & 2013–2017)	2018	Corruption
	Ma Ying-jeou	Taiwan	President of the Republic of China (2008-2016)	2018	Leaking classified information
	Abdulla Yameen	Maldives	President of the Maldives (2013–2018)	2019	Corruption
	Thaksin Shinawatra	Thailand	Prime Minister of Thailand (2001–2006)	2019	Corruption
	Nur Bekri	China	Chairman of the Xinjiang Uyghur Autonomous Region; People's Government (2008–2014)	2019	Bribery
	Pervez Musharraf	Pakistan	President of Pakistan (2001–2008)	2019	Treason
	Asif Ali Zardari	Pakistan	President of Pakistan (2008–2013, 2024–present)	2019	Corruption
	Najib Razak	Malaysia	Prime Minister of Malaysia (2009–2018)	2019	Corruption
	Zhantoro Satybaldiyev	Kyrgyzstan	Prime Minister of Kyrgyzstan (2012–2014)	2019	Corruption
	Sapar Isakov	Kyrgyzstan	Prime Minister of Kyrgyzstan (2017–2018)	2019	Corruption
	Abdrabbuh Mansur Hadi	Yemen	President of Yemen (2012–2022)	2020	Treason
	Dendeviin Terbishdagva	Mongolia	Prime Minister of Mongolia (2014)	2020	Abuse of power
	Jargaltulgyn Erdenebat	Mongolia	Prime Minister of Mongolia (2016–2017)	2020	Abuse of power
	Mendsaikhany Enkhsaikhan	Mongolia	Prime Minister of Mongolia (1996–1998)	2020	Abuse of power
	Aung San Suu Kyi	Myanmar	State Counsellor of Myanmar (2016–2021)	2021	Illegally importing walkie-talkies
	Win Myint	Myanmar	President of Myanmar (2018–2021)	2021 (pardoned and released 2026)	Corruption, incitement of opposition, violations of COVID-19 protocols
	Mukhammedkalyi Abylgaziev	Kyrgyzstan	Prime Minister of Kyrgyzstan (2018–2020)	2021	Corruption
	Ömürbek Babanov	Kyrgyzstan	Prime Minister of Kyrgyzstan (2011–2012)	2021	Corruption
	Kubanychbek Jumaliyev	Kyrgyzstan	Prime Minister of Kyrgyzstan (1998)	2021	Corruption
	Temir Sariyev	Kyrgyzstan	Prime Minister of Kyrgyzstan (2015–2016)	2021	Corruption
	Sooronbay Jeenbekov	Kyrgyzstan	President of Kyrgyzstan (2017-2020) & Prime Minister of Kyrgyzstan (2016–2017)	2021	Corruption
	Djoomart Otorbaev	Kyrgyzstan	Prime Minister of Kyrgyzstan (2014–2015)	2022	Corruption
	Karim Massimov	Kazakhstan	Prime Minister of Kazakhstan (2014–2016)	2023	Treason
	Imran Khan	Pakistan	Prime Minister of Pakistan (2018–2022)	2023	Corruption
	Sheikh Hasina	Bangladesh	Prime Minister of Bangladesh (2009–2024)	2024	Overthrown
	Bashar al-Assad	Syria	President of Syria (2000–2024)	2024	Overthrown
	Rodrigo Duterte	Philippines	President of the Philippines (2016–2022)	2025	Extrajudicial killings
	Yoon Suk Yeol	South Korea	President of South Korea (2022–2025)	2026	Insurrection
	Han Duck-soo	South Korea	Acting President of South Korea (2024–2025) (Note: The criminal convictions are largely centered on Han's conduct while prime minister of South Korea, which is neither the head of state nor head of government. The perjury charge concerns statements Han made while also serving as the acting president.)	2026	Aiding an insurrection; Falsifying and destroying official documents; Perjury

== Europe ==
Portrait	Name	Countries	Official position	Later imprisonment	Reason
	Valerian	Roman Empire	Emperor of Rome (253–260)	260	Overthrown
	Mary, Queen of Scots	Scotland	Queen of Scotland (1542–1567)	1587	Treason (Executed by beheading)
	Charles I of England	England, Scotland & Ireland	King of England, Scotland, and Ireland (1625–1649)	1649	Overthrown (Executed by beheading)
	Louis XVI	France	King of France (1774–1792)	1793	Overthrown (Executed by beheading)
	Lajos Batthyány	Hungary	Prime Minister of the Kingdom of Hungary (1848)	1849	Overthrown (Executed by firing squad)
	Nicholas II of Russia	Russia	Emperor of Russia (1894–1917)	1917	Overthrown (Executed by firing squad)
	Carol II of Romania	Romania	King of Romania (1930–1940)	1940	Overthrown
	Géza Lakatos	Hungary	Prime Minister of the Kingdom of Hungary (1944)	1945	Crimes against humanity
	Bogdan Filov	Bulgaria	Prime Minister of Bulgaria (1940–1943)	1945	Crimes against humanity (Executed by firing squad)
	Dobri Bozhilov	Bulgaria	Prime Minister of Bulgaria (1943–1944)	1945	Crimes against humanity (Executed by firing squad)
	Benito Mussolini	Italy	Prime Minister of Italy (1922–1945)	1945	Crimes against humanity (Executed by firing squad)
	Philippe Pétain	France	Chief of the Government (1940); Chief of the French State (1940–1944)	1945	Crimes against humanity and Treason
	Pierre Laval	France	Chief of the Government (1931–1932, 1935–1936, 1940 & 1942–1944)	1945	Crimes against humanity and Treason (Executed by firing squad)
	Vidkun Quisling	Norway	Minister President of Norway (1942–1945)	1945	Crimes against humanity and Treason (Executed by firing squad)
	Risto Ryti	Finland	President of Finland (1940–1944)	1945	Treason
	Ibrahim Biçakçiu	Albania	Prime Minister of Albania (1944)	1945	Crimes against humanity
	Georgios Tsolakoglou	Greece	Prime Minister of Greece (1941–1942)	1945	Crimes against humanity and Treason
	Ivan Ivanov Bagryanov	Bulgaria	Prime Minister of Bulgaria (1944)	1945	Crimes against humanity (Executed by firing squad)
	Petar Gabrovski	Bulgaria	Prime Minister of Bulgaria (1943)	1945	Crimes against humanity
	Wilhelm Frick	Nazi Germany	Protector of Bohemia and Moravia (1943–1945)	1946	Crimes against humanity (Executed by hanging)
	Ferenc Szálasi	Hungary	Head of State of Hungary (1944–1945)	1946	Crimes against humanity (Executed by hanging)
	Döme Sztójay	Hungary	Prime Minister of the Kingdom of Hungary (1944)	1946	Crimes against humanity (Executed by firing squad)
	Karl Hermann Frank	Nazi Germany	Reich Minister for Bohemia and Moravia (1942–1945)	1946	Crimes against humanity (Executed by hanging)
	Hans Frank	Nazi Germany	Governor-General of the General Government of Occupied Poland (1939–1945)	1946	Crimes against humanity (Executed by hanging)
	Kurt Daluege	Nazi Germany	Protector of Bohemia and Moravia (1942–1943)	1946	Crimes against humanity (Executed by hanging)
	Kostaq Kotta	Albania	Prime Minister of Albania (1928–1930 & 1936–1939)	1946	Crimes against humanity
	Béla Imrédy	Hungary	Prime Minister of the Kingdom of Hungary (1938–1939)	1946	Crimes against humanity (Executed by firing squad)
	Ion Antonescu	Romania	Prime Minister of Romania (1940–1944)	1946	Crimes against humanity (Executed by firing squad)
	Ioannis Rallis	Greece	Prime Minister of Greece (1943–1944)	1946	Crimes against humanity and Treason
	Konstantinos Logothetopoulos	Greece	Prime Minister of Greece (1943–1944)	1946	Crimes against humanity and Treason
	Arthur Seyss-Inquart	Nazi Germany	Chancellor of Austria (1938) & Reich Commissioner of the Netherlands (1940–1945)	1946	Crimes against humanity (Executed by hanging)
	László Bárdossy	Hungary	Prime Minister of the Kingdom of Hungary (1941–1942)	1946	Crimes against humanity (Executed by firing squad)
	Karl Dönitz	Nazi Germany	President of the German Reich (1945)	1946	Crimes against humanity
	Johan Wilhelm Rangell	Finland	Prime Minister of Finland (1941–1943)	1946	Crimes against humanity
	Edwin Linkomies	Finland	Prime Minister of Finland (1943–1944)	1946	Crimes against humanity
	Konstantin von Neurath	Nazi Germany	Protector of Bohemia and Moravia (1939–1943)	1946	Crimes against humanity
	Jan Syrový	Czechoslovakia	Prime Minister of Czechoslovakia (1938)	1945	Treason
	Rudolf Beran	Czechoslovakia	Prime Minister of Czechoslovakia (1938–1939); Prime Minister of the Protectorate of Bohemia and Moravia (1939)	1941 & 1945	Treason
	Emil Hácha	Czechoslovakia	President of Czechoslovakia (1938–1939); President of the Protectorate of Bohemia and Moravia (1939–1945)	1945	Treason
	Alois Eliáš	Protectorate of Bohemia and Moravia	Prime Minister of the Protectorate of Bohemia and Moravia (1939–1941)	1941	Treason (Executed by firing squad)
	Jaroslav Krejčí	Protectorate of Bohemia and Moravia	Prime Minister of the Protectorate of Bohemia and Moravia (1941–1945)	1945	Treason
	Richard Bienert	Protectorate of Bohemia and Moravia	Prime Minister of the Protectorate of Bohemia and Moravia (1945)	1945	Treason
	Vojtech Tuka	Slovakia	Prime Minister of the Slovak Republic (1939–1944)	1946	Crimes against humanity (Executed by hanging)
	Jozef Tiso	Slovakia	President of the Slovak Republic (1939–1945)	1947	Crimes against humanity (Executed by hanging)
	Hinrich Lohse	Nazi Germany	Reichskommissar for the Ostland (1941–1944); Oberpräsident of the Province of Schleswig-Holstein (1933–1945); Gauleiter of Gau Schleswig-Holstein (1925–1945)	1948	Crimes against humanity
	Erich Koch	Nazi Germany	Gauleiter of Gau East Prussia (1928–1945), Oberpräsident of East Prussia (1933–1945); Reichskommissar of Ukraine (1941–1944); Reichskommissar for the Ostland (1944–1945)	1950	Crimes against humanity
	Eggert Reeder	Nazi Germany	Administrator of Belgium and Northern France (1940–1944)	1951	Crimes against humanity
	Alexander von Falkenhausen	Nazi Germany	Governor of Belgium and Northern France (1940–1944)	1951	Crimes against humanity
	Konstantin Päts	Estonia	President of Estonia (1938–1940)	1952	Anti-Soviet agitation
	Imre Nagy	Hungary	Prime Minister of Hungary (1953–1955 & 1956)	1958	Overthrown (Executed by hanging)
	Zoltán Tildy	Hungary	Prime Minister of the Kingdom of Hungary (1945–1946) & President of Hungary	1958	Overthrown
	Georgios Zoitakis	Greece	Regent of Greece (1967–1972)	1974	Treason and Insurrection
	Georgios Papadopoulos	Greece	President of Greece (1973) & Prime Minister of Greece (1967–1973)	1974	Treason and Insurrection
	Wojciech Jaruzelski	Poland	President of Poland (1981–1989)	1989	Treason and Corruption
	Nicolae Ceaușescu	Romania	President of Romania (1974–1989)	1989	Overthrown (Executed by firing squad)
	Todor Zhivkov	Bulgaria	General Secretary of the Bulgarian Communist Party (1954–1989)	1990	Overthrown
	Egon Krenz	East Germany	Chairman of the State Council (1989)	1990	Manslaughter
	Erich Honecker	East Germany	General Secretary of East Germany (1971–1989)	1992	Manslaughter
	Adil Çarçani	Albania	Prime Minister of Albania (1981–1991)	1994	Abuse of office
	Biljana Plavšić	Republika Srpska	President of Republika Srpska (1996–1998)	2003	Crimes against humanity
	Milan Babić	Republic of Serbian Krajina	President of the Republic of Serbian Krajina (1991–1992); Prime Minister of the Republic of Serbian Krajina (1995)	2004	Crimes against humanity
	Pavlo Lazarenko	Ukraine	Prime Minister of Ukraine (1996–1997)	2004	Fraud
	Momčilo Krajišnik	Bosnia and Herzegovina	Serb Member of the Presidency of Bosnia and Herzegovina (1996–1998)	2006	Crimes against humanity
	Ramiz Alia	Albania	President of Albania (1991–1992)	2006	Murder
	Milan Martić	Republic of Serbian Krajina	President of Republic of Serbian Krajina (1994–1995)	2007	Crimes against humanity
	Vlado Bučkovski	Republic of Macedonia	Prime Minister of the Republic of Macedonia (2004–2006)	2008	Corruption
	Nikola Šainović	Serbia	Prime Minister of Serbia (1993–1994) & Deputy Prime Minister of FR Yugoslavia (1994–2000)	2009	Crimes against humanity
	Yulia Tymoshenko	Ukraine	Prime Minister of Ukraine (2007–2010)	2011	Corruption
	Jacques Chirac	France	Prime Minister of France (1974–1976 & 1986–1988) & President of France (1995–2007)	2011	Corruption
	José Sócrates	Portugal	Prime Minister of Portugal (2005–2011)	2014	Corruption
	Vano Merabishvili	Georgia	Prime Minister of Georgia (2012)	2014	Corruption
	Adrian Năstase	Romania	Prime Minister of Romania (2000–2004)	2014	Bribery
	Svetozar Marović	Serbia and Montenegro	President of Serbia and Montenegro (2003–2006)	2016	Corruption
	Vlad Filat	Moldova	Prime Minister of Moldova (2009–2013)	2016	Corruption
	Radovan Karadžić	Republika Srpska	President of Republika Srpska (1992–1996)	2016	Crimes against humanity
	Robert Kocharyan	Armenia	President of Armenia (1998–2008)	2018	Corruption
	Ivo Sanader	Croatia	Prime Minister of Croatia (2003–2009)	2018	Corruption
	Mykola Azarov	Ukraine	Prime Minister of Ukraine (2010–2014)	2019	Treason
	Viktor Yanukovych	Ukraine	President of Ukraine (2010–2014)	2019	Treason
	Serzh Sargsyan	Armenia	President of Armenia (2008–2018)	2020	Corruption
	François Fillon	France	Prime Minister of France (2007–2012)	2020	Fraud
	Nicolas Sarkozy	France	President of France (2007–2012)	2021	Bribery
	Mikheil Saakashvili	Georgia	President of Georgia (2004–2007 & 2008–2013)	2021	Abuse of power
	Nikola Gruevski	North Macedonia	Prime Minister of the Republic of Macedonia (2006–2016)	2022	Money laundering
	Igor Dodon	Moldova	President of Moldova (2016–2020)	2022	Corruption and Treason
	Fadil Novalić	Bosnia and Herzegovina	Prime Minister of the Federation of Bosnia and Herzegovina (2015–2023)	2023	Corruption
	Sebastian Kurz	Austria	Chancellor of Austria (2017–2019, 2020-2021)	2024	Perjury

== North America ==
Portrait	Name	Countries	Official position	Later imprisonment	Reason
	José Damián Villacorta	El Salvador	Head of State of El Salvador (1830)	1832	Overthrown
	Jefferson Davis	United States	President of the Confederate States of America (1862–1865)	1865	Treason
	Gerardo Barrios	El Salvador	President of El Salvador (1858, 1859–1860, 1861–1863)	1865	Overthrown
	Maximilian I of Mexico	Mexico	Emperor of Mexico (1864-1867)	1867	Conspiring to overthrow the government (executed by firing squad)
	Francisco I. Madero	Mexico	President of Mexico (1911–1913)	1913	Overthrown (executed by firing squad)
	Oreste Zamor	Haiti	President of Haiti (1914)	1915	Illegal entry
	Élie Lescot	Haiti	President of Haiti (1941–1946)	1946	Overthrown
	Salvador Castaneda Castro	El Salvador	President of El Salvador (1945–1948)	1948	Overthrown, corruption
	Franck Sylvain	Haiti	President of Haiti (1957)	1957	Overthrown
	Maurice Bishop	Grenada	Prime Minister of Grenada (1979–1983)	1983	Overthrown (Executed by firing squad)
	Norman Saunders	Turks and Caicos Islands	Chief Minister of the Turks and Caicos Islands (1980–1985)	1985	Drug smuggling
	Bernard Coard	Grenada	Prime Minister of Grenada (1983)	1986	Murder
	Salvador Jorge Blanco	Dominican Republic	President of the Dominican Republic (1982–1986)	1988	Corruption
	Manuel Noriega	Panama	President of Panama (1983–1989)	1989	Drug trafficking
	Prosper Avril	Haiti	President of Haiti (1988–1990)	2001	Conspiracy, murder
	Arnoldo Alemán	Nicaragua	President of Nicaragua (1997–2002)	2003	Corruption
	Basdeo Panday	Trinidad and Tobago	Prime Minister of Trinidad and Tobago (1995–2001)	2006	Fraud
	Manuel Zelaya	Honduras	President of Honduras (2006–2009)	2009	Overthrown
	Rafael Ángel Calderón Fournier	Costa Rica	President of Costa Rica (1990–1994)	2009	Corruption
	Miguel Ángel Rodríguez	Costa Rica	President of Costa Rica (1998–2002)	2011	Corruption
	Ernesto Pérez Balladares	Panama	President of Panama (1994-1999)	2012	Money laundering
	McKeeva Bush	Cayman Islands	Premier of the Cayman Islands (2009–2012)	2012	Corruption
	Jean-Claude Duvalier	Haiti	President of Haiti (1971–1986)	2013	Corruption
	Efraín Ríos Montt	Guatemala	President of Guatemala (1982–1983)	2014	Crimes against humanity
	Alfonso Portillo	Guatemala	President of Guatemala (2000–2004)	2014	Bribery
	Otto Pérez Molina	Guatemala	President of Guatemala (2010–2015)	2015	Corruption
	Gerrit Schotte	Curaçao	Prime Minister of Curacao (2010–2012)	2016	Bribery
	David Brandt	Montserrat	Chief Minister of Montserrat (1997–2001)	2015	Child sex abuse
	Álvaro Colom	Guatemala	President of Guatemala (2008–2012)	2018	Corruption
	Antonio Saca	El Salvador	President of El Salvador (2004–2009)	2018	Corruption
	Michael Misick	Turks and Caicos Islands	Chief Minister of the Turks and Caicos Islands (2003–2006); Premier of the Turks and Caicos Islands (2006–2009)	2019	Fraud
	Juan Orlando Hernández	Honduras	President of Honduras (2014–2022)	2022	Drug trafficking
	Andrew Fahie	British Virgin Islands	Premier of the Virgin Islands (2019–2022)	2022	Drug trafficking

== Oceania ==
Portrait	Name	Countries	Official position	Later imprisonment	Reason
	Steve Christian	Pitcairn Islands	Mayor of Pitcairn Islands (1999–2004)	2004	Child sex abuse
	Laisenia Qarase	Fiji	Prime Minister of Fiji (2000–2006)	2012	Corruption
	Gaston Flosse	French Polynesia	President of French Polynesia (1984–1987, 1991–2005, 2008 & 2013–2014)	2013	Corruption
	Mahendra Chaudhry	Fiji	Prime Minister of Fiji (1999–2000)	2014	Fraud
	Moana Carcasses Kalosil	Vanuatu	Prime Minister of Vanuatu (2013–2014)	2015	Bribery
	Serge Vohor	Vanuatu	Prime Minister of Vanuatu (1995–1998, 2004, 2009 & 2011)	2015	Bribery
	Mike Warren	Pitcairn Islands	Mayor of Pitcairn Islands (2008–2013)	2016	Child sex abuse
	Oscar Temaru	French Polynesia	President of French Polynesia (2004, 2005–2006, 2007–2008, 2009 & 2011–2013)	2019	Fraud
	Sialeʻataongo Tuʻivakanō	Tonga	Prime Minister of Tonga (2010–2014)	2020	Bribery
	Frank Bainimarama	Fiji	Prime Minister of Fiji (2007–2022)	2023	Abuse of Office
	Peter O'Neill	Papua New Guinea	Prime Minister of Papua New Guinea (2011–2019)	2023	Abuse of Office

== South America ==
Portrait	Name	Countries	Official position	Later imprisonment	Reason
	Diogo Mendonça Furtado	Governorate General of Brazil	Governor General of Brazil	1624	Overthrown
	José María Vargas	Venezuela	President of Venezuela (1835–1836)	1835	Overthrown. Briefly put into house arrest during the Revolution of the Reforms
	José Antonio Páez	Venezuela	President of Venezuela (1830–1835)	1849	Prisoner of war
	José Gregorio Monagas	Venezuela	President of Venezuela (1851–1855)	1858	March Revolution
	Julián Castro	Venezuela	President of Venezuela (1858–1859)	1859	Overthrown
	Washington Luís	Brazil	President of Brazil (1926–1930)	1930	Overthrown
	Isaías Medina Angarita	Venezuela	President of Venezuela (1941–1945)	1945	Overthrown
	Rómulo Gallegos	Venezuela	President of Venezuela (1948)	1948	Overthrown
	Café Filho	Brazil	President of Brazil (1954–1955)	1955	Attempted coup
	Marcos Pérez Jiménez	Venezuela	President of Venezuela (1953–1958)	1963	Corruption
	João Goulart	Brazil	President of Brazil (1961–1964)	1964	Overthrown
	Isabel Perón	Argentina	President of Argentina (1974–1976)	1976	Overthrown
	Henck Arron	Suriname	Prime Minister of Suriname (1975–1980)	1980	Overthrown
	Roberto Eduardo Viola	Argentina	President of Argentina (1981)	1983	Murder
	Leopoldo Galtieri	Argentina	President of Argentina (1981–1982)	1986	Mishandling of the Falklands War
	Luis García Meza	Bolivia	President of Bolivia (1980–1981)	1995	Crimes against humanity
	Carlos Andrés Pérez	Venezuela	President of Venezuela (1974–1979, 1989–1993)	1996	Corruption
	Augusto Pinochet	Chile	President of Chile (1974–1990)	1998	Crimes against humanity
	Fabián Alarcón	Ecuador	President of Ecuador (1997–1998)	1999	Fraud
	Hugo Chávez	Venezuela	President of Venezuela (1999–2002, 2002–2013)	2002	Attempted coup
	Errol Alibux	Suriname	Prime Minister of Suriname (1983–1984)	2003	Forgery
	Luis Ángel González Macchi	Paraguay	President of Paraguay (1999–2003)	2006	Corruption
	Gregorio Conrado Álvarez	Uruguay	President of Uruguay (1981–1985)	2007	Crimes against humanity
	Alberto Fujimori	Peru	President of Peru (1990–2000)	2009	Corruption and human rights violations
	Reynaldo Bignone	Argentina	President of Argentina (1982–1983)	2010	Murder
	Jorge Rafael Videla	Argentina	President of Argentina (1976–1981)	2010	Murder
	Juan María Bordaberry	Uruguay	President of Uruguay (1972–1976)	2010	Crimes against humanity
	Jamil Mahuad	Ecuador	President of Ecuador (1998–2000)	2014	Corruption
	Ollanta Humala	Peru	President of Peru (2011–2016)	2017	Corruption
	Luiz Inácio Lula da Silva	Brazil	President of Brazil (2003–2010 & 2023–present)	2018	Corruption
	Alejandro Toledo	Peru	President of Peru (2001–2006)	2019	Corruption
	Pedro Pablo Kuczynski	Peru	President of Peru (2016–2018)	2019	Corruption
	Michel Temer	Brazil	President of Brazil (2016–2018)	2019	Corruption and money laundering
	Álvaro Uribe	Colombia	President of Colombia (2002–2010)	2020	Bribery and witness tampering
	Jeanine Áñez	Bolivia	President of Bolivia (2019–2020)	2021	Breach of duties
	Dési Bouterse	Suriname	President of Suriname (2010–2020) & Chairman of the National Military Council (1980–1987)	2022	Murder
	Pedro Castillo	Peru	President of Peru (2021–2022)	2022	Treason, rebellion, and corruption
	Cristina Fernández de Kirchner	Argentina	President of Argentina (2007–2015), Vice President of Argentina (2019–2023)	2022	Fraud
	Fernando Collor	Brazil	President of Brazil (1990-1992)	2025	Corruption
	Jair Bolsonaro	Brazil	President of Brazil (2019-2023)	2025	Violation of judicial precautionary measures before his trial for attempted coup d'état. After his conviction, the provisional detention was converted into definitive imprisonment
	Luis Arce	Bolivia	President of Bolivia (2020-2025)	2025	Corruption.
	Nicolás Maduro	Venezuela	President of Venezuela (2013-2026)	2026	Captured by U.S. forces in January 2026 and taken to New York to face federal charges of drug trafficking and narco-terrorism, in a military operation that also overthrew his government in Caracas.
	Santiago Peña	Paraguay	President of Paraguay (2023–2026)	2026	Breach of trust, fraudulent management, conflict of interest, and administrative corruption.

== See also ==
- List of former heads of regimes who were sentenced to death
