= State of Anjouan =

1997–2008 unrecognized country in Africa

State of Anjouan État d’Anjouan
- 1997-2002; 2007-2008
- Flag

- Status: Claimed by the Comoros; De facto fully administered as an unrecognized state from 3 August 1997 until 25 March 2008.
- Capital: Mutsamudu
- Common languages: Comorian (Shikomori), French, Arabic
- Religion: Islam
- Government: Unitary presidential republic: under a military dictatorship (2001–2008)
- President
  - 1997–1999: Foundi Abdallah Ibrahim
  - 1999–2001: Said Abeid
  - 2001–2008: Mohamed Bacar
- History
  - 1997 Anjouan independence referendum: 26 October 1997-2002; 2007-2008
  - Coup d'état by Mohamed Bacar: 9 August 2001
  - 2008 invasion of Anjouan: 25 March
- Currency: Comorian franc
Preceded by	Succeeded by
Federal Islamic Republic of the Comoros	Union of the Comoros; (Anjouan)
- Today part of: Comoros; Anjouan

The State of Anjouan (French: État d’Anjouan; Ndzwani Comorian: Ndzwani) was an unrecognized country that existed on the island of Anjouan, part of the Comoros archipelago, during two main periods between 1997 and 2008. Although it exercised de facto control over the island and maintained its own political institutions, the State of Anjouan was never recognized by any sovereign state or international organization and was regarded under international law as part of the Union of the Comoros.

After a dispute with the Comorian government in 2007, the African Union, backed by France, Libya, and the United States, launched an invasion of Anjouan in March 2008, which resulted in the overthrow of Mohamed Bacar and the reintegration of Anjouan into the Union of the Comoros. Bacar managed to escape to Mayotte by speedboat dressed as a woman, and reports on March 26 confirmed his presence on the island and stated he had requested political asylum in France. Bacar was later captured and put on trial for illegally entering French territory.

== Background ==
Anjouan is one of the three main islands of the Comoros, alongside Grande Comore and Mohéli. Following Comorian independence from France in 1975, the country experienced chronic political instability, including numerous coups and economic decline. By the 1990s, dissatisfaction with the central government was particularly strong on Anjouan, where local leaders accused Moroni of neglect and unequal distribution of resources.

== History ==
On 3 August 1997, separatist leaders on Anjouan unilaterally declared the island's independence as the State of Anjouan. Foundi Abdallah Ibrahim became president, and a provisional government was established. An independence referendum held in October 1997 reportedly produced an overwhelming vote in favor of independence, though the vote was not monitored by international observers and was rejected by the Comorian government.

Following the declaration, Anjouan's leaders formally requested integration into the French Republic, citing cultural and economic ties. France rejected the request and reaffirmed its recognition of Comorian sovereignty over the island.

== Political institutions and governance ==
During its period of de facto independence, Anjouan adopted its own constitution in February 1998, established executive and legislative bodies, and maintained local security forces. Despite these institutions, the state was marked by factionalism, weak administrative capacity, and limited international contact. the 80-year-old Foundi Abdallah Ibrahim would be usurped by Colonel Said Abeid after a couple days of street battles in September 1999.. Abeid's government was later overthrown in a coup by army and navy officers led by Mohamed Bacar on 9 August 2001. Bacar soon rose to leadership of the junta that took over and on 14 April 2002, he officially became the president of Anjouan. Despite two coup attempts in the following three months, including one by Abeid, Bacar's government remained in power and was apparently more willing to negotiate with Comoros.

=== Federal reintegration and continued de facto rule ===
In 2001, negotiations between separatist authorities and the Comorian government resulted in a new federal constitution creating the Union of the Comoros, granting significant autonomy to each island. Anjouan formally rejoined the Comoros in 2002 under this arrangement, electing its own island president while remaining part of the union.

However, the island again functioned as a de facto state after 2007, when Anjouan's president Mohamed Bacar refused to step down at the end of his term. Bacar organized an unsanctioned election and asserted independence from the Union government, exercising full control over the island despite international condemnation.

== Diplomatic relations ==
Throughout its existence, the State of Anjouan failed to obtain diplomatic recognition. The Organisation of African Unity and its successor the African Union as well as the United Nations consistently affirmed the territorial integrity of the Union of the Comoros and rejected Anjouan's claims to sovereignty.

== Collapse ==
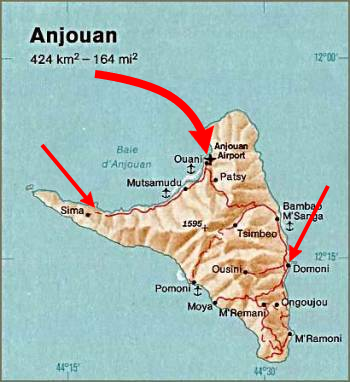
Map of the 2008 invasion of Anjouan by Comoran and African Union troops

On 25 March 2008, Comorian federal forces, supported by troops from the African Union, launched a military intervention to restore constitutional order on Anjouan. The operation rapidly defeated Bacar's forces, and he fled to the French-administered island of Mayotte dressed as a woman. This intervention effectively ended Anjouan's de facto independence. Many Anjouanese celebrated the downfall of Bacar and cheered on the African Union troops. Bacar would attempt to acquire political asylum in France, however Comoran leaders and anti-French protesters in Comoros would demand that France return Bacar to the Comoros. On March 27, Bacar was moved to the French island of Réunion, where he was charged and investigated for illegally entering French territory while carrying weapons, along with 23 of his followers. The case was rejected for procedural reasons, but Bacar and the 23 others remained in custody. Comoran President Sambi later visited Anjouan in early April, marking his first visit to the island since May 2007. And stated that he hoped that separatism in Anjouan would cease with the removal of Bacar from power, and he praised the African leaders who had provided assistance for the invasion.

== Legacy ==
The State of Anjouan is often cited in academic literature as a modern example of a quasi-state, characterized by limited recognition, internal instability, and reliance on coercive control rather than international legitimacy. Its existence influenced the development of Comoros’ federal system and continues to shape debates over autonomy and governance within the archipelago.

== See also ==
- State of the Comoros
- Chechen Republic of Ichkeria
- Islamic Emirate of Rafah
- Democratic Republic of Yemen
