= List of invasions in the 21st century =

This is a list of military invasions that occurred or are still ongoing in the 21st century.

== List ==
Invasion	Invading forces	Defending forces
2026 invasion of Ethiopia	Eritrea	Ethiopia
2026 invasion of Lebanon	Israel	Hezbollah; Lebanon (Note: Defensive only)
Part of the Israel–Hezbollah conflict (2023–present) – On 2 March, Israel relaunched another large-scale military invasion of Lebanon against Hezbollah
2024 invasion of Syria	Israel	Syria; UNDOF (Note: Defensive only) Assad loyalists
Part of the aftermath of the Syrian Civil War – On 8 December, Israel launched an invasion of Syria after the fall of the Syrian Arab Republic
2024 invasion of Lebanon	Israel	Hezbollah; Lebanon (Note: Defensive only); UNIFIL (Note: Defensive only)
Part of the Israel–Hezbollah conflict (2023–present) – On 1 October, Israel launched a military invasion of Lebanon against Hezbollah
2024 invasion of Kursk	Ukraine	Russia; North Korea
Part of the Russo-Ukrainian War – On 6 August, Ukraine launched an incursion into Kursk Oblast. The largest settlement captured by Ukraine was Sudzha. North Korea sent forces to assist Russia starting in November 2024.
2023 invasion of the Gaza Strip: Beit Hanoun; Gaza City; Jabalia; Khan Yunis; Rafah	Israel (Palestine) Popular Forces (Fatah) Hilles clan (Fatah) Khanidak clan	(Palestine) Gaza Strip (Hamas) Hamas; Islamic Jihad; PFLP; DFLP; PRC; Jaysh al-Ummah (Gaza)
Part of the Gaza war – After being attacked by Hamas earlier in 2023, Israel launched a large-scale invasion of the Gaza Strip to remove Hamas from political and military power, laying siege to Gaza City and Khan Yunis
2022 al-Shabaab invasion of Ethiopia	Al-Shabaab	Ethiopia
Part of the Ethiopian–Somali conflict and Somali civil war – On 20 July, the Al-Shabaab militant group launched an invasion of Ethiopia’s Somali Region from Somalia. The invasion was the largest attack by al-Shabaab in Ethiopian territory to date.
2022 invasion of the Democratic Republic of the Congo	Rwanda; March 23 Movement	Democratic Republic of the Congo
2022 invasion of Ukraine: Eastern; Avdiivka; Kharkiv; Mariupol; Northern; Kyiv; Chernihiv; Sumy; Snake Island; Southern; Kherson; Mykolaiv; Enerhodar	Russia; Donetsk PR; Luhansk PR	Ukraine
Part of the Russo-Ukrainian War – On 24 February, Russia launched a full-scale military invasion of Ukraine. The invasion became the largest attack on a European country since World War II. It is estimated to have caused tens of thousands of Ukrainian civilian casualties and hundreds of thousands of military casualties. By June 2022, Russian troops occupied about 20% of Ukrainian territory and established military or military-civilian administrations in several regions and cities.
2017 invasion of the Gambia	Senegal; Nigeria; Ghana; Mali; Togo	Gambia
2014 invasion of Gaza: Shuja'iyya	Israel	(Palestine) Gaza Strip (Hamas) Hamas; Islamic Jihad; PFLP; DFLP
2014 invasion of Ukraine: Crimea; Donetsk Oblast and Luhansk Oblast	Russia	Ukraine
Part of the Russo-Ukrainian War –
2011 invasion of Somalia	Kenya	Somalia
Part of the Somali civil war –
2009 invasion of Gaza	Israel	Gaza Strip: Hamas; Popular Front for the Liberation of Palestine; Islamic Jihad Movement in Palestine; (Palestine) Fatah; Popular Resistance Committees
Part of the Gaza–Israel conflict –
2008 invasion of Georgia	Russia	Georgia
Part of the Abkhazia conflict, Georgian–Ossetian conflict, and Post-Soviet conflicts –
2008 invasion of Anjouan	Comoros; Senegal; Sudan; Tanzania; France; Libyan Arab Jamahiriya; United States	State of Anjouan
2006 invasion of Lebanon	Israel	Hezbollah
On July 22, Israel launched a military invasion of Lebanon against Hezbollah.
2006 invasion of Somalia	Ethiopia (Somalia) Transitional Federal Government; United States	Islamic Courts Union; ONLF; Eritrea
Part of the Ethiopian–Somali conflict –
2004 invasion of Gaza	Israel (IDF)	Hamas; Palestinian Islamic Jihad; Popular Resistance Committees
Part of the Second Intifada –
2003 invasion of Iraq	United States; United Kingdom; Australia; Poland; Kurdistan Region: KDP; PUK; Iraqi National Congress: Free Iraqi Forces	Iraq; MEK
Part of the war on terror and the Iraq War
2001 invasion of Afghanistan	Northern Alliance; United States; United Kingdom; France; Canada; Italy; Turkey; Germany; Australia; New Zealand; Iran	Islamic Emirate of Afghanistan; Taliban; Haqqani network; Non-state allies: Al-Qaeda
Part of the War in Afghanistan – Following the September 11 attacks, the United States declared the beginning of the war on terror. This subsequently led a multinational invasion of Taliban-ruled Afghanistan, which started on 7 October 2001. The goal of the invasion was to dismantle al-Qaeda, which had executed the attacks under the leadership of Osama bin Laden, and to deny Islamist militants a safe base of operations in Afghanistan by toppling the Taliban government. The capital city of Afghanistan, Kabul, was captured by the coalition on 13 November and the Taliban government collapsed on 17 December.

== See also ==
- List of battles in the 21st century
- List of coups d'état and coup attempts
- List of revolutions and rebellions
