= Mount Ntringui National Park =

National park in the Comoros

- Parc National Mont Ntringui
- IUCN category II (national park)
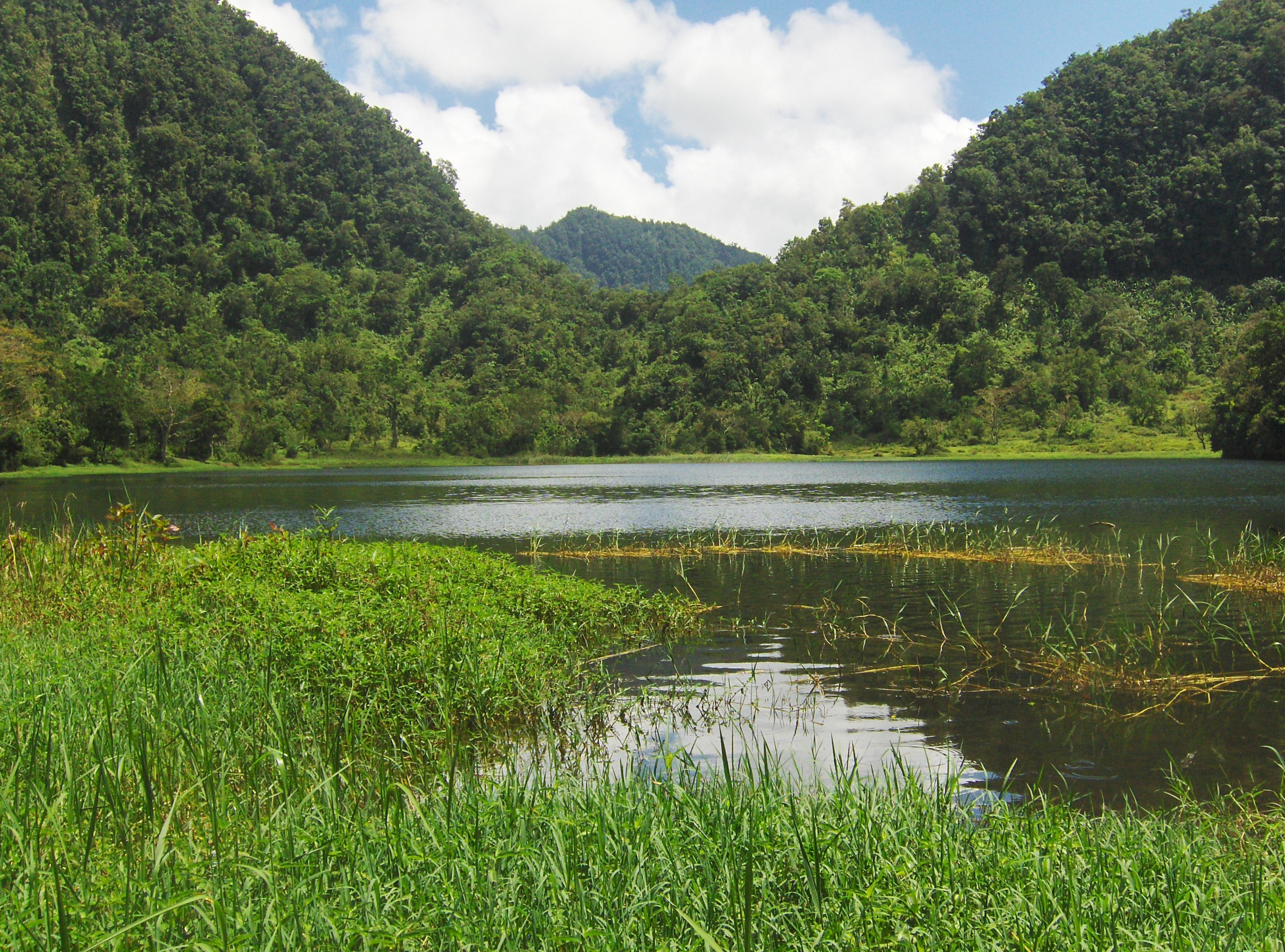
- Lake Dzialandzé

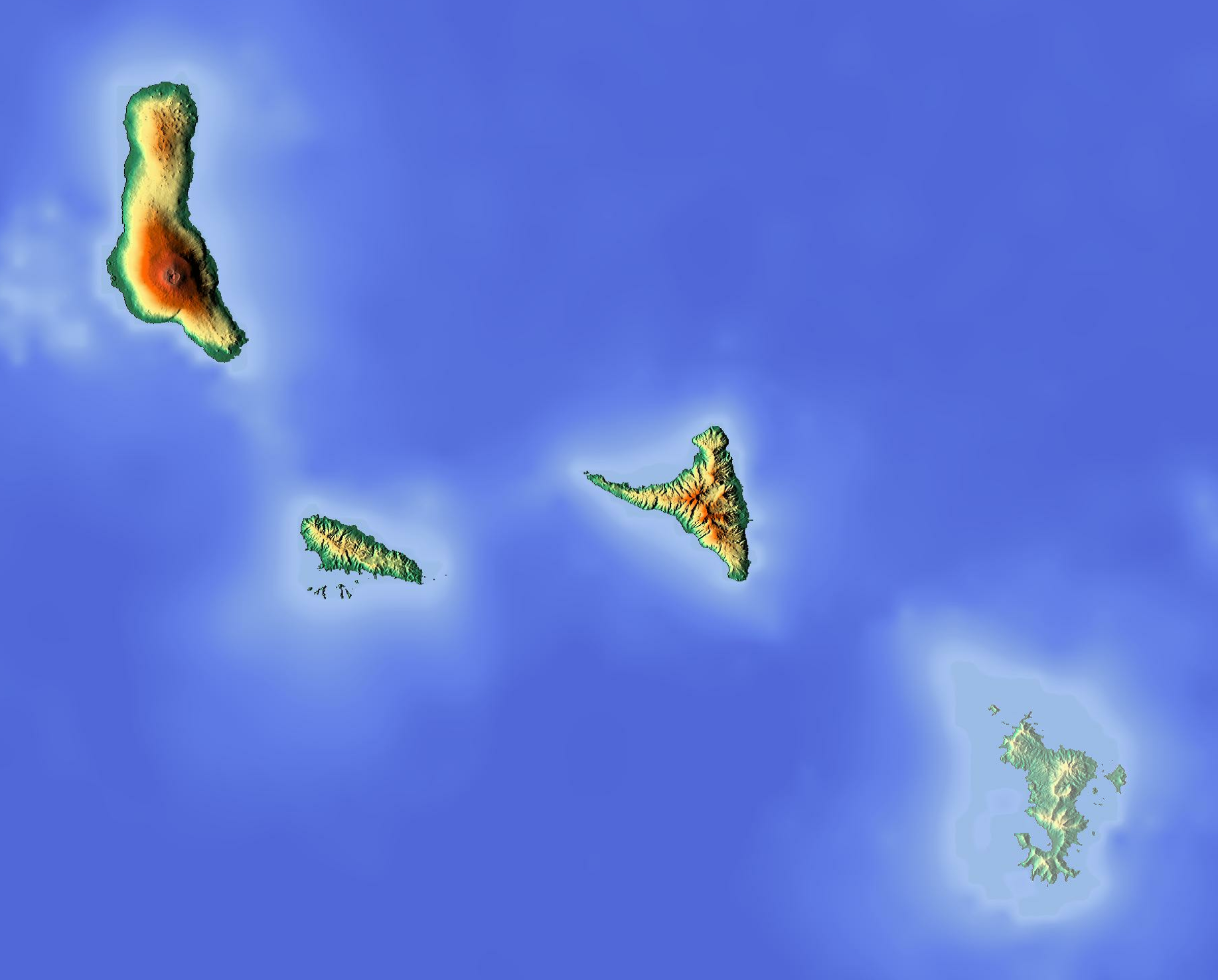
- Location within Comoros
- Location: Anjouan, Comoros
- Nearest city: Mutsamudu
- Coordinates: 12°12′55.5″S 44°25′31.1″E
- Area: 7,914 ha (30.56 sq mi)
- Designated: 2010
- Administrator: The Comoros National Parks Agency

Ramsar Wetland
- Official name: Le Mont Ntringui
- Designated: 12 November 2006
- Reference no.: 1650

Mount Ntringui National Park is a national park on the island of Anjouan in the Comoros. It covers an area of 79.14 km^{2} in the center of the island. The park was established in 2010.

== Park ==
The park includes Mount Ntringui, Anjouan's highest peak, as well as Lake Dzialandzé, a crater lake that is Anjouan's largest lake, and the Moya Forest, Anjouan's largest remaining forest.

The park includes both Mount Ntringui (1.595 m), the highest peak on Anjouan, and Mount Trindrini (1.474 m), the second-highest, which lies southeast of Mt. Ntringui. These peaks are the source of many of Anjouan's permanent rivers and streams, many of which have carved deep ravines and cirques in the mountain flanks. Lake Dzialandzé is located at 900 meters elevation in a crater on the southeastern flank of Mount Ntringui, and covers an area of 2 hectares. It is home to the little grebe (Tachybaptus ruficollis) and Anjouan's indigenous freshwater fish.

Anjouan was originally covered in forest. Most of the island's forests have been cleared, and what is left is under pressure from timber harvesting and clearance for agriculture and grazing land. The remaining forests are mostly within the park. Moya Forest, south of Mount Trindrini in the southern portion of the park, is the largest forest remnant on Anjouan, covering an area of approximately 500 ha. It is home to several native animals, including two bats (Livingstone's flying fox (Pteropus livingstonii) and Pteropus seychellensis var. comorensis), Anjouan scops owl (Otus capnodes), and mongoose lemur (Eulemur mongoz).
