= Anjouan =

Anjouan Nzwani Île Autonome d'Anjouan Ndzuwani جزيرة أنزون المتمتعة بالحكم الذاتي
- Autonomous island
- Autonomous Island of Anjouan
- Flag

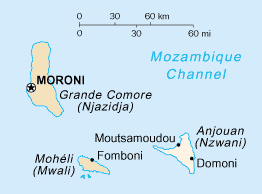
- Anjouan is the easternmost island of the Comoros islands

- Anjouan in the Comoros
- Coordinates: 12°12′54″S 44°25′30″E
- Country: Comoros
- Capital: Mutsamudu

Government
  - Type: Autonomous Island within a presidential republic
  - Governor: Zaidou Youssouf

Area
  - Total: 424 km^{2} (164 sq mi)
- Elevation: 1,595 m (5,233 ft)

Population (2018)
  - Total: 360,409
  - Density: 850/km^{2} (2,200/sq mi)
- Time zone: UTC+03:00 (EAT)

Anjouan ([ɑ̃.ʒu.ɑ̃]) is an autonomous volcanic island in the Comoro Islands in the southwestern Indian Ocean, part of the Union of the Comoros. It is known in Shikomori as Ndzuani, Ndzuwani or Nzwani, and, until the early twentieth century when the name fell out of general use (although still sometimes used by English-speakers in Zanzibar), in English as Johanna. Historically it was also called Hinzuan or Hanzoan.

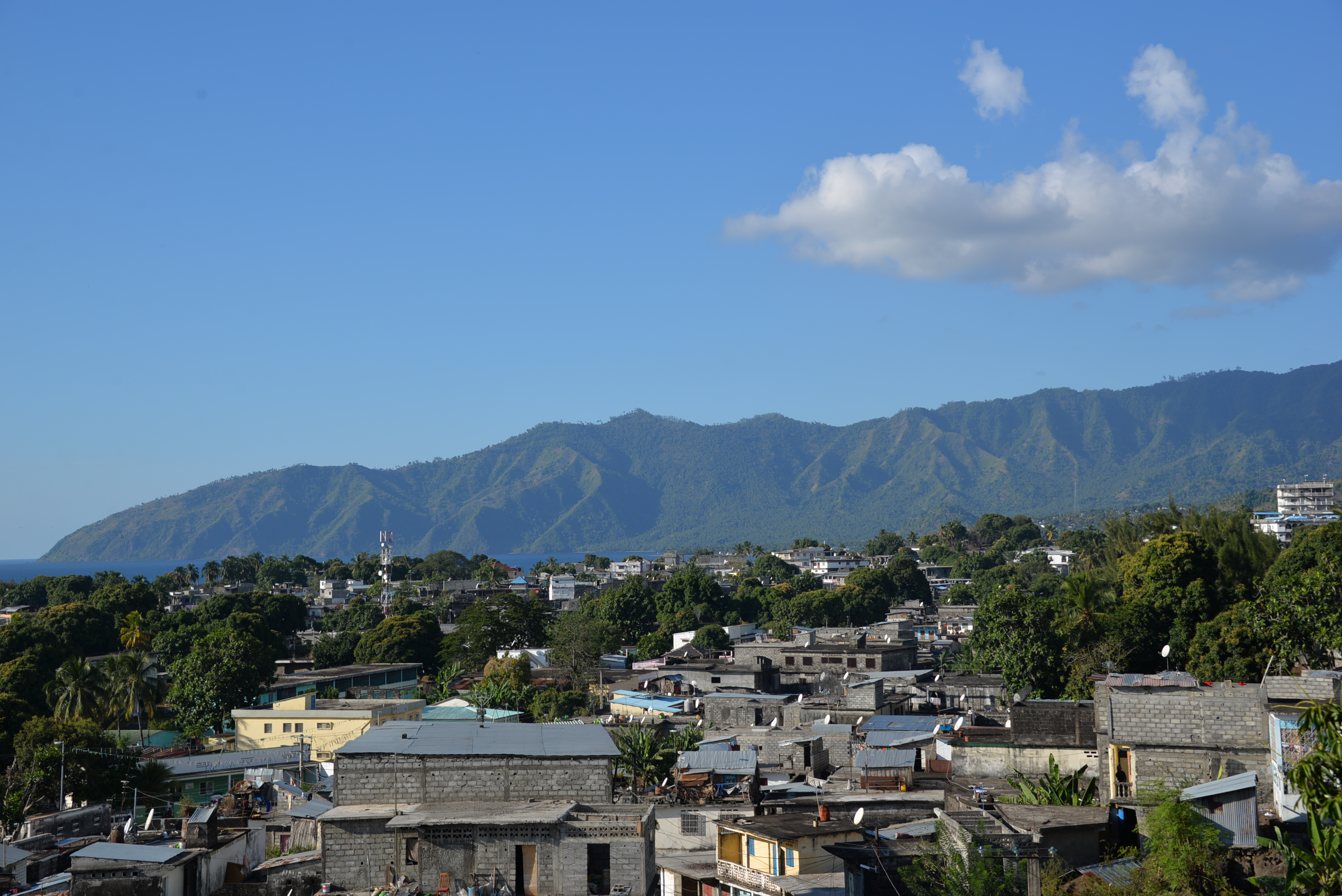
The town of Mutsamudu

Its chief town is Mutsamudu and, as of 2006, its population is around 277,500. The total area of the island is 424 square kilometres (163 square miles).

== History ==
=== Early and colonial history ===
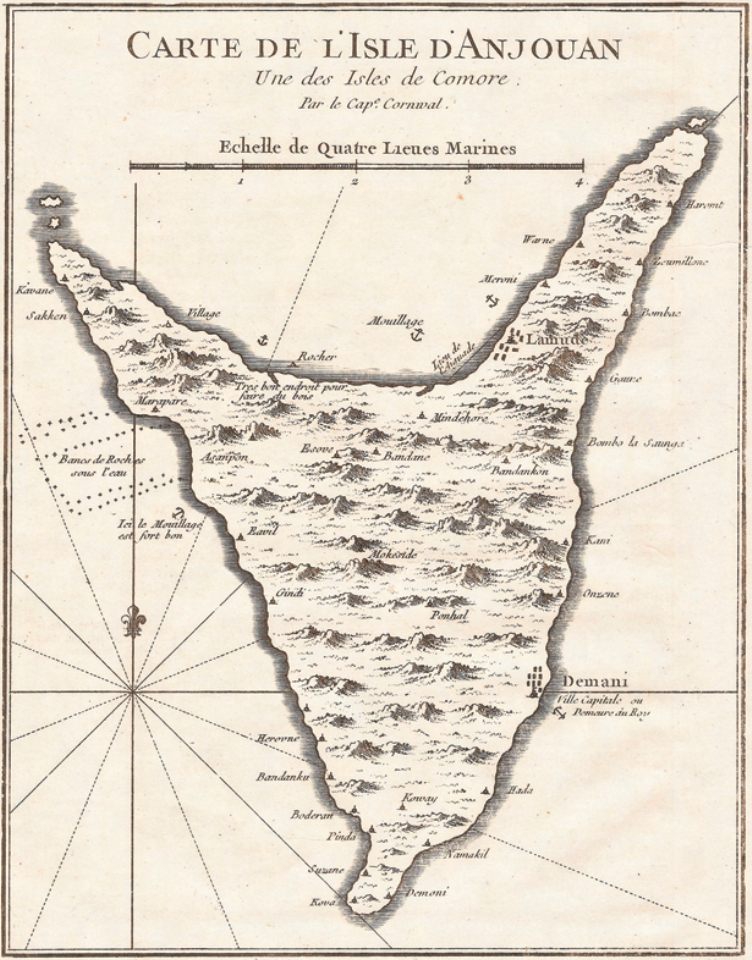
Map of Anjouan (1748) by French hydrographer Jacques Nicolas Bellin.

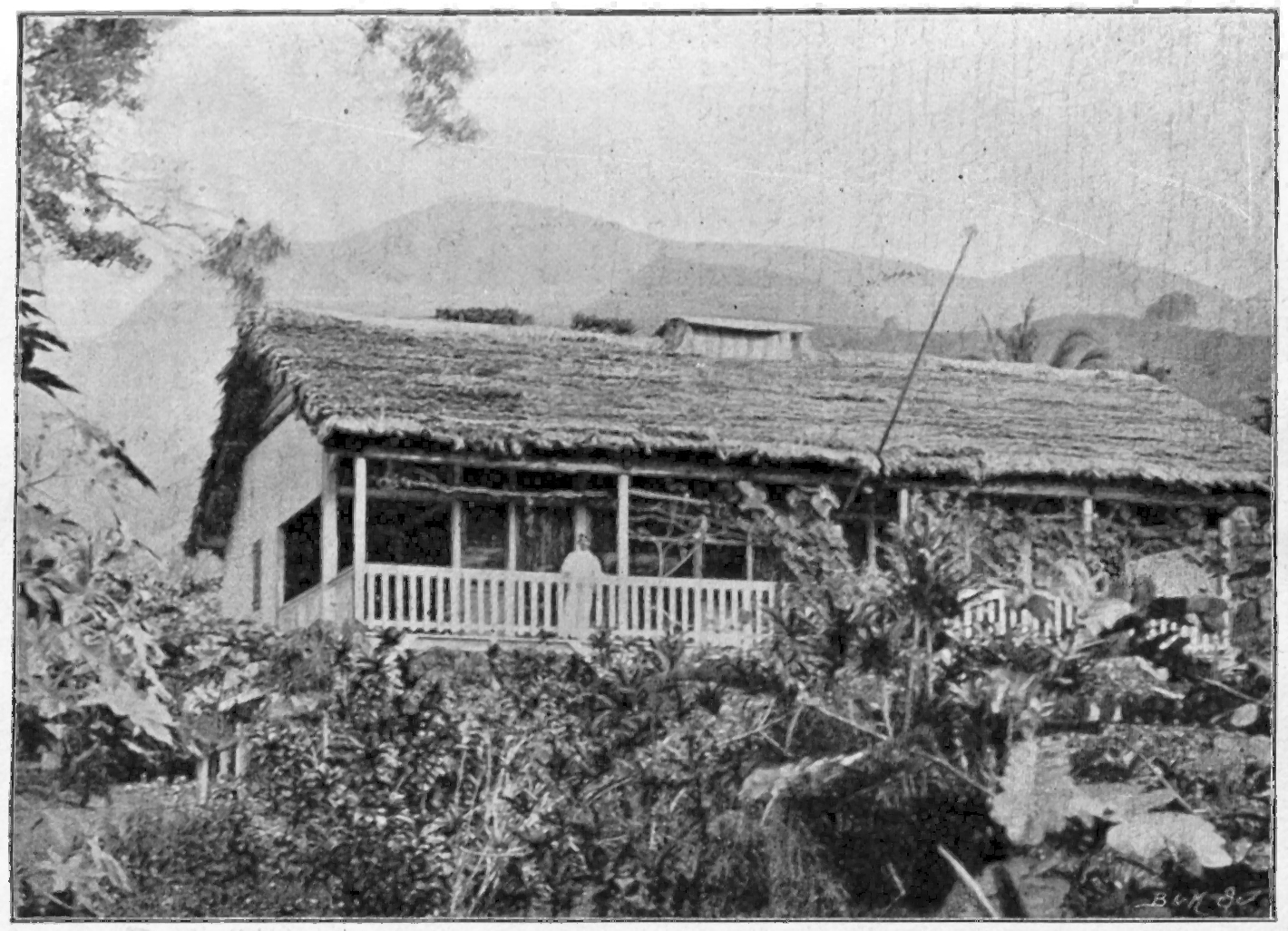
French Residency in Anjouan, 1900

The first inhabitants of the island were Bantu-speaking peoples from eastern Africa and navigators from Indonesia and Southwest Asia. In the late fifteenth century high status Hadrami Arab immigrants married into the local ruling classes and established a sultanate that extended its control over the entire island and occasionally extending their influence to the neighboring island of Mwali and Mayotte. In 1812, Sultan Alawi bin Husain requested British assistance against Malagasy slavers who were threatening his domain, which was turned down. Nevertheless, the island remained within the British sphere of influence until the late 19th century. In 1886 France, already present in Mayotte, established a protectorate over the island; slavery was abolished in 1899, and in 1912, following the forced abdication of the last sultan, France formally annexed the island.

John Mucknell marooned his enemies on Anjouan in 1644. His ship, the John, was owned by the East India Company, but after ridding himself of opposition in this manner, he turned pirate and returned to Britain.

=== Anjouan under independent Comoros ===
Anjouan joined the State of Comoros when it became independent in 1975, with Ahmed Abdallah as president of the State of Comoros. The island, being a part of the country, has gone through more than 20 coups since independence and has experienced several attempts at secession.

=== Secessionist/Autonomous Anjouan ===
In 1997, the islands of Anjouan and Mohéli seceded from the Comoros. On 3 August 1997, Anjouan declared itself the independent State of Anjouan (État d'Anjouan) with Foundi Abdallah Ibrahim as president. An independence referendum was subsequently held in October, with over 99% voting in favour. The island then asked to be integrated again into the French Republic; but France refused. A constitution was adopted for Anjouan in a referendum on 25 February 1998.

In 1999, Anjouan had internal conflicts and on 1 August of that year, the 80-year-old Foundi Abdallah Ibrahim resigned, transferring power to a national coordinator, Said Abeid. The government was overthrown in a coup by army and navy officers on 9 August 2001. Mohamed Bacar soon rose to leadership of the junta that took over and by the end of the month he was the leader of the country. Despite two coup attempts in the following three months, including one by Abeid, Bacar's government remained in power and was apparently more willing to negotiate with Comoros.

After the creation of the Union, the islands were reunified with Comoros in 2002 and a new Union of the Comoros constitution mandated the election of a President of Anjouan along with presidents for the other two autonomous islands and a President of the Union. Bacar was elected for a 5-year term as President of the island of Anjouan. His term expired on 14 April 2007 and the president of the assembly, Houmadi Caambi, became acting president from 15 April until he was overthrown by forces loyal to Bacar on 10 May.

Peace talks were held between the Comorian and Anjouan governments whereby they agreed to hold free elections in which Mohamed Bacar would stand. Although the Union government delayed the election - citing alleged irregularities and intimidation — Bacar unilaterally printed ballots and held an illegal election in June. The result, due to electoral fraud, was an overwhelming victory of 90 percent. In July 2007, he once again declared the island of Anjouan to be independent of the Comoros.

=== 2008 invasion of Anjouan ===
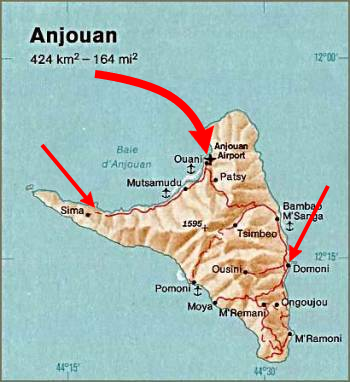
Map of the 2008 invasion of Anjouan by Comoran and African Union troops

In February 2008, the Comoros rejected the African Union's extended sanctions against Anjouan and instead opted for a military solution. In early March, the Comoros armed forces and around 400 international reinforcements from the African Union assembled on the island of Mohéli. Hostilities began on 11 March 2008, when Comorian forces staged an armed incursion on the island but diplomacy continued with an intervention by South African President Thabo Mbeki who attempted to delay the planned invasion to the distinct displeasure of the Comorian government. There were further incursions between 14 March and 16 March 2008 and clashes between local forces loyal to Mohamed Bacar and, presumably, those from the African Union invasion force which then retreated back to Mohéli.

On 19 March 2008, a French military helicopter on a clandestine mission from French-administered Mayotte crashed in the Mozambique Channel close to the city of Sima on Anjouan. Critics of the action allege the helicopter was involved in an attempt to bring Bacar into French exile, and that Bacar was able to hold out so long only because he was protected by the French.

The main operation and, ultimately, the invasion of Anjouan began on the evening of 24 March 2008 when five boats transporting approximately 1,500 soldiers had left Mohéli on their way to Anjouan. In the early hours of 25 March 2008, an amphibious landing was made by Comoran troops supported by contingents from the African Union. The combined forces quickly advanced on the town of Ouani to secure the airfield. After the airport was secured the invasion force apparently split where part of it headed south-west to engage Anjouanais loyalists in the capital, Mutsamudu, and the remainder headed south-east capturing the port of Bambao M'Sanga and the second city of Domoni without resistance.

Mohamed Bacar managed to escape to Mayotte by 26 March to seek political asylum. He was subsequently held in custody there by the French administration and brought to the island of Réunion, where he was charged for entering French territory illegally and possession of weapons. On 15 May 2008, France rejected Bacar's request for asylum but the French refugee office ruled that the ousted leader could not be extradited to Comoros because of the risk of persecution. France's State Secretary for Overseas, Yves Jégo, said France would support the Comoran government's efforts. "We will continue to act in consultation with the Comoros so that the law can be applied and Colonel Bacar can be tried."

=== Post-invasion Anjouan ===
Following the March 2008 invasion of Anjouan, the interim president of Anjouan was Laili Zamane Abdou In May 2008, The Constitutional Court of the Comoros approved five candidates to contest the Anjouan presidential election of 15 June and invalidated the candidacy of Mohamed Bacar. Comoran President A.A. Sambi supported engineer Moussa Toybou for the position who won a bare plurality in the initial balloting. In the second round of the elections held on 29 June, he was contested by political veteran Mohamed Djaanfari but won with 52% of the vote. The Presidency of Anjouan was later transformed into the position of Governor of Anjouan.

== Geography ==
Map of Anjouan

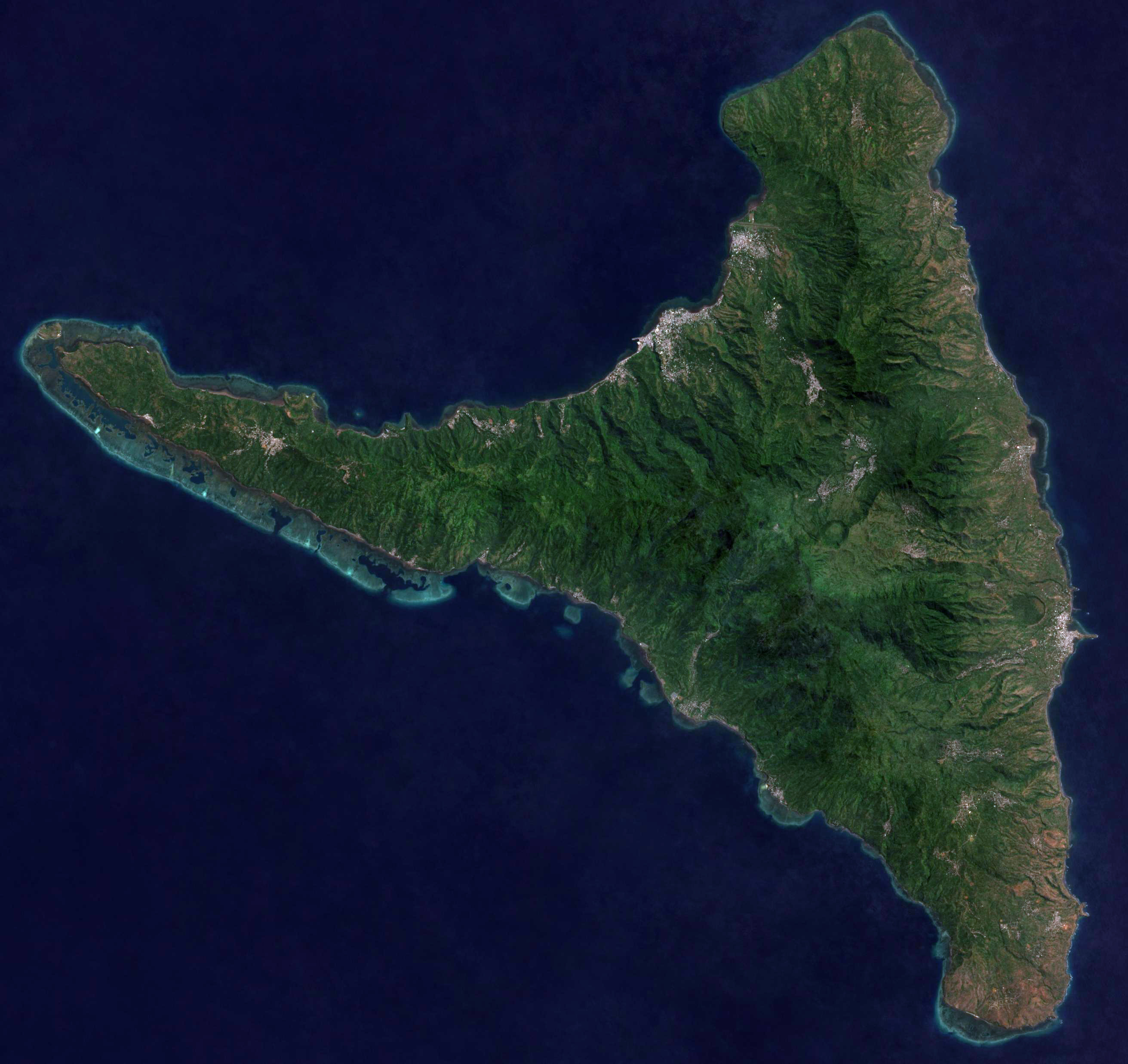
Satellite imagery of Anjouan, 2022

Anjouan is part of the Comoros Islands located in the Mozambique Channel. It consists of the eroded remains of a large shield volcano that formed in the Pleistocene epoch. Eruptions from fissure vents spanned in three directions, followed by a long interval of erosion. Renewed volcanism produced a series of lava flows that filled deep valleys and flooded areas along the coast. The island is known for its steep, mountainous terrain and black sand beaches. Mount Ntringui is the highest point in the island of Anjouan with an elevation of 1,595 m (5,233 ft) above sea level. The second most important (and the most populous) city on Anjouan is Domoni. The main strategic area is the airfield at Ouani, with its 1.5 km runway, and the bay with the coastal road from the chief town Mutsamudu in the east out to the city of Sima in the west.

=== Climate ===
The highs on the island range from 27 to 32 °C (81 to 90 °F) year-round. The weather is warm and humid from December to April and slightly cooler from May to November. The climate is generally much cooler in the center of the island, on the highest mountains, and generally warmer in the North-Eastern region, North of Domoni.

== Flora and fauna ==
Anjouan is home to a diversity of plant life, much of which is edible. The island is abundant in cassava, bananas, mangoes, soursop, avocados, oranges, taro, and vanilla.

The Anjouan scops owl is a rare owl. The Anjouan sparrowhawk is a possibly extinct subspecies of the Frances's goshawk. Lemurs are commonly found in the mountainous regions of the island. Two species of lizards, Flexiseps johannae and Paroedura sanctijohannis, are named after the island, and are found on the island and elsewhere in the Comoros.

=== Important Bird Area ===
A 6,850 ha tract encompassing the highlands of the island has been designated an Important Bird Area (IBA) by BirdLife International because it supports populations of Comoro olive pigeons, Comoro blue pigeons, Anjouan scops owls, Malagasy harriers, Madagascar brush warblers, Comoro thrushes, Anjouan sunbirds and red-headed fodies.

=== Protected areas ===
Mount Ntringui National Park was established in 2010, and covers an area of 79.14 km^{2} in the center of the island. The park includes Mount Ntringui and Mount Trindrini, Anjouan's highest and second-highest peaks, as well as Lake Dzialandzé, Anjouan's largest lake, and the Moya Forest, Anjouan's largest remaining forest.

Shisiwani National Park is a marine national park, which protects the coastal waters, including coral reefs, around the Sima Peninsula. It was established in 2010, and has an area of 64.97 km^{2}.

== Culture ==
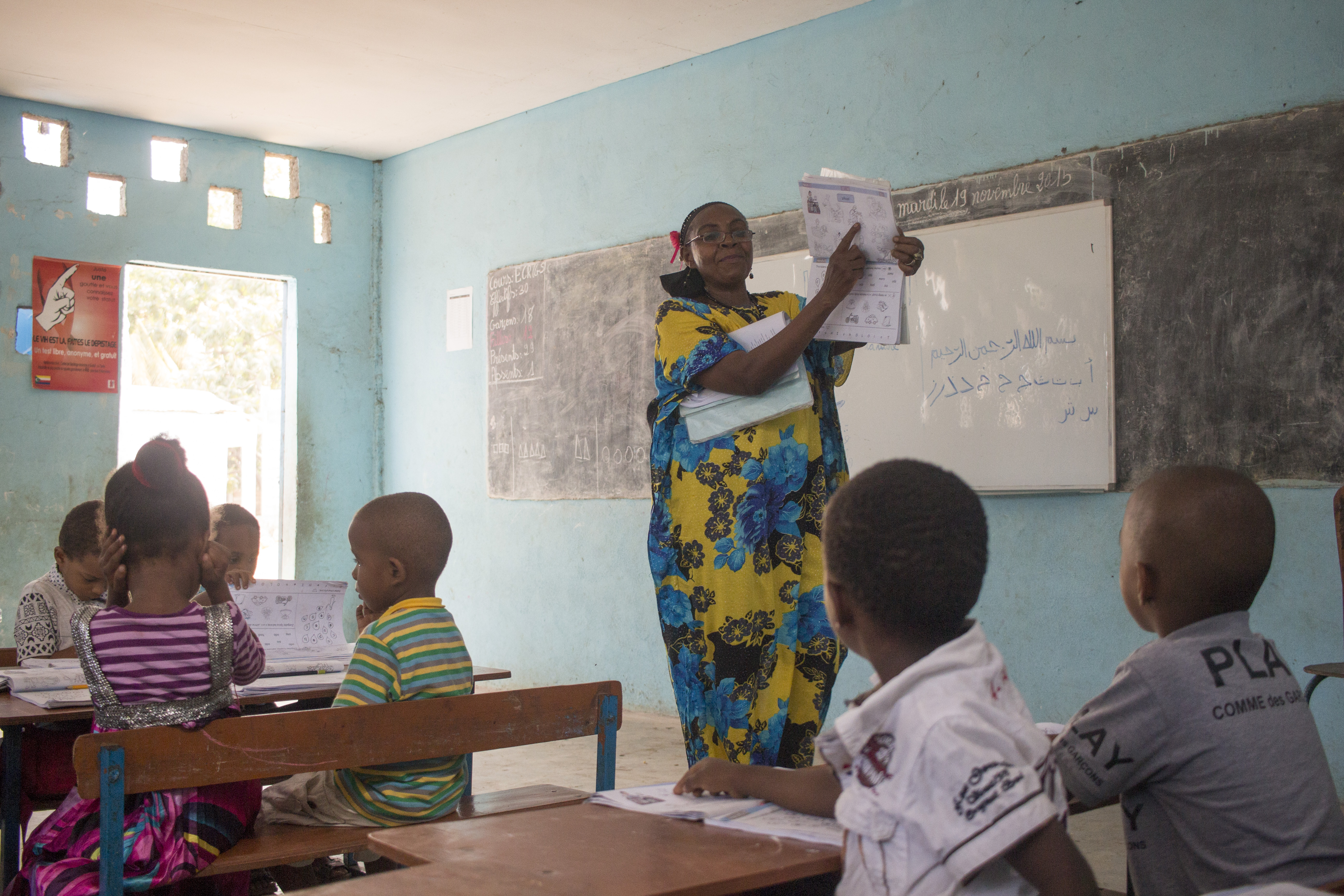
Teaching Arabic in a prescolair class. Though students speak Shikomori, they commonly learn Arabic and French in the classroom.

Anjouan is the island with the highest population density in Comoros. The main religion is Sunni Islam. Although the island is filled with large numbers of mosques, religious observance is not as strict as it is in many other countries observing Islam. The Comoros national state-owned TV station broadcasts locally. Anjouan also operates its own radio station.

=== Language ===
The people of Anjouan speak Shindzuani, a dialect of Shikomori. Though they have similar grammatical structures and much shared vocabulary, Shindzuani varies greatly from the dialect of the capital island, Shingazija, and linguists have debated whether they should truly be considered the same language. Public schools and government functions are carried out in French, but in daily life, Shindzuani is spoken almost exclusively. Additionally, many people living on Anjouan are fairly familiar with Arabic through language classes and the reading on the Quran from an early age. It is not uncommon for students to attend Quranic school in addition to their normal schooling.

=== Clothing ===
Anjouan is known for the wearing of the Shiromani, a sheet-like article of clothing women wrap around their body. The Shiromani is often red, expressing the color of the island of Anjouan.

=== Cuisine ===
The local cuisine has a great deal of Arab and French influence. Spices such as turmeric, cloves, and cumin are widely used. Common Anjouan foods include fish with coconut rice, pigeon pea stew, cooked taro, and cassava dishes. Cassava leaves are eaten just as often as the roots, cooked with coconut milk and often paired with rice in a dish called mataba. Hot peppers are also common in the form of a hot sauce called putu, which is prepared by grinding fresh peppers together on stone. The spiciness and general flavor of putu greatly depending on family and region.

Different regions of Anjouan are known for different crops. Clove trees fill the Northeast corner of the island and the central mountainous region is rich in lychee trees. Bananas, jackfruit, breadfruit, mangoes, papaya, red guava, green guava, a variety of lime, and small oranges are common all over the island. Vanilla is grown by some for export, but is not commonly consumed by Comorians themselves.

== Economy ==
The island uses the Comorian franc as a currency which is printed by the Bank of France and issued by the Central Bank of the Comoros. Many people on the island farm ylang-ylang, vanilla, and cloves. The economy of the island is dependent on agriculture and related industries. These industries employ over 80% of the workforce. The island's main food staple is rice, all of which is imported. Anjouan is the world's primary exporter of ylang-ylang oil, an ingredient in almost all perfumes.

=== Banking system ===
As part of the Union of the Comoros, the banking system of Anjouan is regulated by the Central Bank of the Comoros, created in 1981. Anjouan, pursuant to the Regulation of Banks and Comparable Establishments of 1999, licensed more than 300 offshore banks. All of the shell banks and other entities are located offshore and have no permanent presence in the Comoros. Anjouan sold the right to issue bank licenses and delegated most of its authority to operate and regulate the offshore business to private, non-Comoran domiciled parties.

In 2002, after Anjouan's reentry into the Union of the Comoros as an autonomous island, Anjouan's Offshore Finance Authority was established to promote the island as a tax haven to attract foreign capital.

In 2005, new laws were passed and all of the banking licenses issued there previous to that date were canceled. Those that could show proper due diligence were reset by the newly rearranged Offshore Finance Authority, monopolized by Anjouan Corporate Institution Limited (ACIL) since 2003, which has claimed the authority as registered agent for all International Business Companies and banking license issuance on the island since that time and authorized directly by the Legislative Assembly in Anjouan. The company claiming to sell licenses previous to 2003 was sued in the London High Court on behalf of the Anjouan Government and lost, The High Court of Justice in London confirmed after seeing all the legal documentation that Anjouan Corporate Institution Limited (ACIL), was legally entitled to operate the offshore business, with full consent of the Anjouan Government. All Banking Licenses were being issued as a Class B Banking License and have terms of one year, which were renewable as long as no complaint had been made against the Bank in violation of anti-money laundering regulations, fraud, or Banking laws.

The Central Bank of Comoros has never commented the Anjouan Offshore Finance Authority's activity. At the same time, on the Central Bank website, in the section "Flash News" from April 4, 2014, it was mentioned: "The Central Bank of Comores recalls that up to date, no license has been delivered for the exercise of financial offshore activities in one of the islands of the Union of the Comoros". So the financial licenses issued by "Anjouan's Offshore Finance Authority" and "Anjouan Corporate Services Limited" were not taken in consideration by the authorities of the Union of Comoros.

It has been told that Anjouan authorities abandoned the development of the offshore financial sector since the summer of 2008 but, based on the orders 001-008 of 2005 of Autonomous Island of Anjouan, Anjouan's Offshore Finance Authority is yet maintaining the possibility to make a request for the different types of licenses through their website. Currently there are nominated less than 50 institutions having the active licenses. However, the law creating non-financial offshore companies was legally adopted by the Parliament of Anjouan and non-financial firms registered in Anjouan are recognized legally.

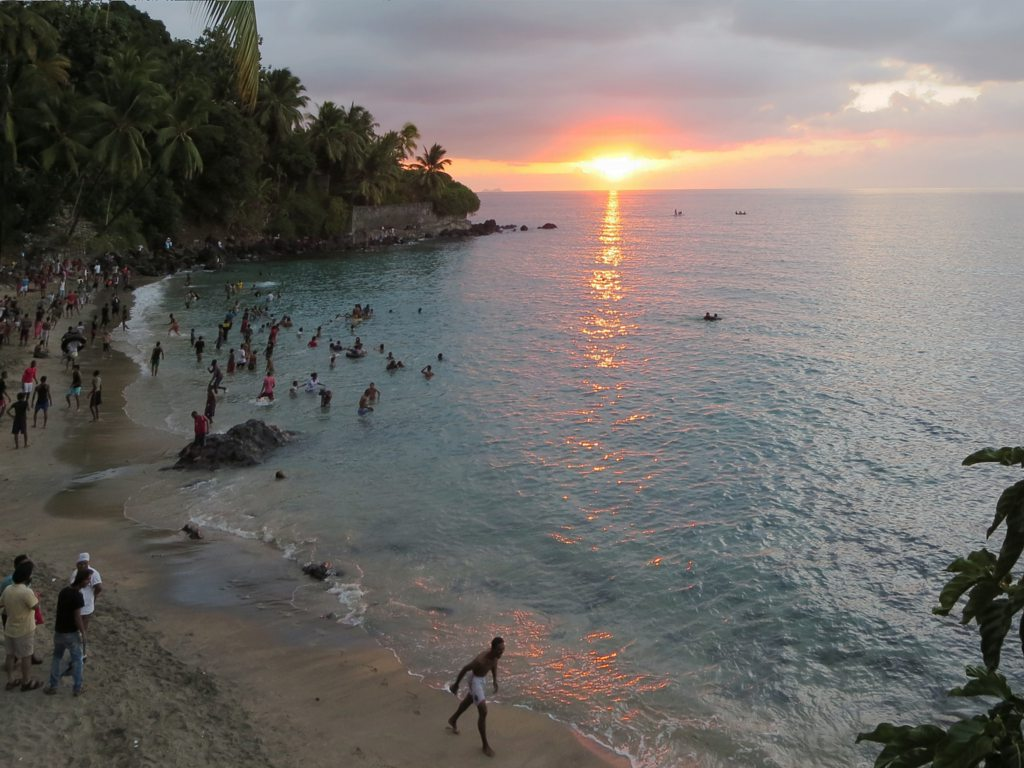
Indian Ocean Sunset on Anjouan Island

=== Tourism ===
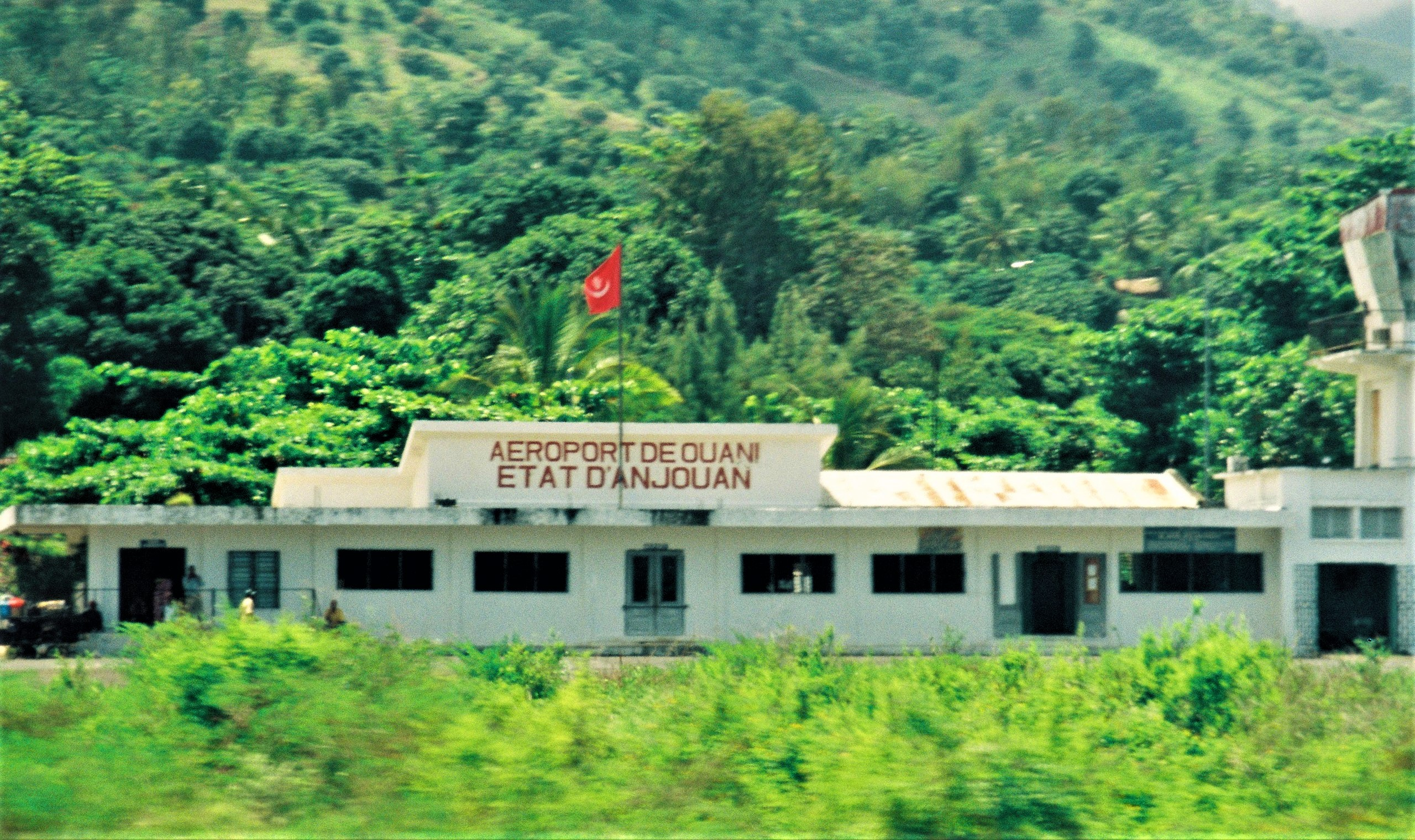
Ouani Airport

- The citadel of Mutsamudu, the market of the city
- The mausoleum of President Ahmed Abdallah in Domoni
- Mount Ntringui National Park which includes the Dzialandze lake and the Mount Ntringui
- The region of Sima where there are many farms of perfume plants which give their nickname to the islands of Comoros.
- The Tratringa waterfalls, at Bambao Mtrouni, and the river of the same name.
- The beach of Moya and the pass of the same name that children ride down on soapboxes.
- The river of Jomani and the Cap Mangeat at the entrance of Domoni.
- The Tratringua waterfall at Ongoni-Marahani
- The wall of Momoni (uhura wa muji) in Domoni

== Government ==
=== Politics ===
Presidential elections were held in Anjouan on 15 June following the 2008 invasion of Anjouan to oust Mohamed Bacar as President of Anjouan. About 128,000 people were eligible to vote. Mohamed Djaanfari, a former vice-president of the Assembly of the Union of the Comoros, and Moussa Toybou, a former minister in Said Mohamed Djohar's government, advanced to the runoff round held on 29 June. The final official result, as confirmed by the constitutional court on 3 July 2008, declared Toybou the winner with 52.42% of the vote to Djaanfari's 47.58%.

December 20, 2010 Anissi Chamsidine is elected Governor of the island of Anjouan. He works for a full reconciliation with the Union of Comoros. To show this will, the separatist flag was dropped and replaced by a new flag with the same symbol than that of the Union of Comoros (the Moslem crescent and four stars symbolizing the four islands of the archipelago). Henceforth the leader of the autonomous island of Anjouan is named Governor instead of President and the Commissioners instead of Ministers.

=== Military ===
Anjouan invested heavily in its national security under Mohamed Bacar. Main components were the Gendarmerie commanded by Commander Abdou, the younger brother of Bacar. A battalion size militia of approximately 500 backed the Gendarmerie. Since the eviction of Bacar in March 2008, the Anjouanais defence forces are led by the Government of the Union of the Comoros.

== See also ==
- State of Anjouan
- Postage stamps of Anjouan
- Akibani
- Antsahé
- Assimpao
- Bada Kouni
- Bada la Djandza
- Chaouéni
- Chironkamba
- Chiroroni
