= 2008 Anjouan presidential election =

15 June 2008 (first round); 29 June 2008 (second round)
Candidate	Moussa Toybou	Mohamed Djaanfari
Popular vote	30,941	28,084
Percentage	52.42%	47.58%
President before election
Lailizamane Abdou Cheik
Elected President
Moussa Toybou

Presidential elections were held in Anjouan on 15 June and 29 June 2008 following the 2008 invasion of Anjouan to oust Mohamed Bacar as President of Anjouan. The election was won by Moussa Toybou, who defeated Mohamed Djaanfari in the second round.

About 128,000 people were eligible to vote, and there were 240 polling stations. Five candidates were qualified to contest the election: Bacar Abdou (deputy for Mutsamudu), Bastoine Soulaimane (a judge and former president of the Anjouan Court of Appeal), Mohamed Djaanfari (former vice-president of the Assembly of the Union of the Comoros), Moussa Toybou (a former minister in Said Mohamed Djohar's government) and Soundi Abdoulatuf (a French military veteran). These candidates were approved by the Constitutional Court on May 20.

Voting for the first round on 15 June, although scheduled to begin at 7am, was delayed by an hour in the main cities, Mutsamudu and Domoni, due to the late arrival of ballot papers or electoral officials. First round turnout was placed at 42.79%.

Toybou was considered a newcomer to politics. He said that he knew "the mechanisms to lift Anjouan out of under-development", and he supported allowing some of those who served under Bacar to remain in administrative roles due to their experience and the need for reconciliation. He also enjoyed the support of President of Comoros Ahmed Abdallah Sambi, while Djaanfari was better known to the local population due to his prior political work.

Campaigning for the second round began on June 21. Toybou won the run-off with 52.37% to Djaanfari's 47.63%, with a turnout of 48.98%; the results had to be validated by the Constitutional Court within three days. Djaanfari contested the result. Turnout in the second round was reportedly higher than in the first one.

== Results ==
The final official result was confirmed by the Constitutional Court on 3 July 2008. Toybou was to be sworn in on 5 July 2008.

Candidate	First round		Second round	
Candidate	Votes	%	Votes	%
Mohamed Djaanfari	21,029	44.18	28,084	47.58
Moussa Toybou	19,096	40.12	30,941	52.42
Soundi Abdoulatuf		5.96		
Bacar Abdou		4.85		
Bastoine Soulaimane		4.89		
Total			59,025	100.00
Valid votes			59,025	94.22
Invalid/blank votes			3,622	5.78
Total votes			62,647	100.00
Registered voters/turnout		42.79	127,953	48.96
Source: Afrol, Centreblog, Constitutional Court
