= Moussa Toybou =

Comorian politician (born 1962)

Moussa Toybou (born 28 November 1962) is the President of the autonomous island of Anjouan in the Union of the Comoros. Toybou won the June 2008 Anjouan presidential election, which was held to replace Mohamed Bacar following the March 2008 invasion of Anjouan. Toybou won 52.42 percent of the vote in the 29 June presidential run-off, defeating Mohamed Djaanfari.

Prior to entering politics, Toybou was trained as a civil engineer in Algeria. In the 2008 election, he was backed by Union President Ahmed Abdallah Sambi. Toybou said that he knew how to "lift Anjouan out of under-development", and he supported allowing some of those who served under Bacar to remain in administrative roles due to their experience and the need for reconciliation.
