= Abdou Salami Abdou =

Comorian politician

Abdou Salami Abdou is a politician from Comoros who is serving as the President of Anjouan from 23 May 2016. In 2018, he was placed under house arrest as he was discovered to be giving money and arms to insurgents.
