= List of heads of state and government who were sentenced to death =

This is an incomplete list of former heads of regimes, like presidents, prime ministers and monarchs, who were sentenced to death by the succeeding regime.

Leader	Country	Born	Title	Died	Notes
Li Si	China (Qin dynasty)	c. 280 BC	Chancellor (? to 208 BCE)	208 BC	Executed by waist chop
Zhao Gao	China (Qin dynasty)	Unknown	Chancellor (208 BC–207 BC)	207 BC	Executed
Ying Ziying	China (Qin dynasty)	Unknown	Emperor (207 BC)	January 206 BC	Executed prisoner of war
Sima Chi	China (Western Jin)	284	Emperor (307 to 311)	March 14, 313	Executed prisoner of war
Sima Ye	China (Western Jin)	300	Emperor (313 to 316)	February 7, 318	Executed prisoner of war
Wen Tianxiang	China (Song dynasty)	June 6, 1236	Chancellor (1275–78)	January 9, 1283	Executed prisoner of war
Zhao Xian	China (Song dynasty)	November 2, 1271	Emperor (1274–76)	May 1323	Ordered to commit suicide
Lady Jane Grey	England; Ireland	c. 1536	Queen (1553)	February 12, 1554	Executed (beheaded by axe)
Mary, Queen of Scots	Scotland	December 8, 1542	Queen of Scotland (1542–1567)	February 8, 1587	Executed (beheaded with axe)
Charles I of England	England; Scotland; Ireland	November 19, 1600	King (1625–1649)	January 30, 1649	Executed by decapitation
Louis XVI	France	August 23, 1754	King (1774–1792)	January 21, 1793	Executed by decapitation (guillotine)
Maximilien Robespierre	(French First Republic) France	May 6, 1758	President (1793–1794)	July 28, 1794	Executed by decapitation (guillotine)
Agustín I	Mexico	September 27, 1783	Regent (1821–1822); Emperor (1822–1823)	July 18, 1824	Executed by firing squad
Francisco Morazán	Central America	October 3, 1792	President (1829, 1830–1834, 1835–1839)	September 15, 1842	Executed by firing squad
Lajos Batthyány	Hungary	February 10, 1807	Prime minister (1848)	October 6, 1849	Executed by firing squad
Gerardo Barrios	El Salvador	September 24, 1813	President (1858, 1859–1860, 1861–1863)	August 29, 1865	Executed by firing squad
Maximilian I	Mexico	July 6, 1832	Emperor (1864–1867)	June 19, 1867	Executed by firing squad
Edward James Roye	Liberia	March 11, 1815	President (1870–1871)	February 11, 1872	Sentenced to death, died in uncertain circumstances before sentence was carried out
Nicholas II	Russia	May 18, 1868	Emperor (1894–1917)	July 17, 1918	Shot along with his family
Omar al-Mukhtar	Libya	August 20, 1858	Ruler of Senussi Zawiyas (1896–1931)	September 16, 1931	Executed by hanging
Peljidiin Genden	Mongolia	1892	President (1924–1927); Prime minister (1932–1936)	November 26, 1937	Executed by firing squad
Ivan Bagryanov	Bulgaria	October 29, 1891	Prime minister (1944)	February 1, 1945	Executed by firing squad
Dobri Bozhilov	Bulgaria	June 13, 1884	Prime minister (1943–1944)	February 1, 1945	Executed by firing squad
Bogdan Filov	Bulgaria	April 9, 1883	Prime minister (1940–1943)	February 2, 1945	Executed by firing squad
Benito Mussolini	Italy	July 29, 1883	Prime minister (1922–1943)	April 28, 1945	Executed by firing squad
Nikola Mandić	Croatia	January 20, 1869	Prime Minister (1943–1945)	June 7, 1945	Executed by firing squad
Vidkun Quisling	Norway	July 18, 1887	Minister president (1942–1945)	October 24, 1945	Executed by firing squad
László Bárdossy	Hungary	December 10, 1890	Prime minister (1941-1942)	January 10, 1946	Executed by firing squad
Béla Imrédy	Hungary	December 29, 1891	Prime minister (1938-1939)	February 28, 1946	Executed by firing squad
Ferenc Szálasi	Hungary	January 6, 1897	Nationleader, Prime minister (1944–1945)	March 12, 1946	Executed by hanging
Ion Antonescu	Romania	June 15, 1882	Prime minister (1940–1944)	June 1, 1946	Executed by firing squad
Chen Gongbo	Collaborationist China	October 19, 1892	President (1944–1945)	June 3, 1946	Executed by firing squad
Döme Sztójay	Hungary	January 5, 1883	Prime minister (1944)	August 29, 1946	Executed by firing squad
Arthur Seyss-Inquart	Austria	July 22, 1892	Chancellor (1938)	October 16, 1946	Executed by hanging
Liang Hongzhi	Collaborationist China	1882	Chairman (1938–1940)	November 6, 1946	Executed by firing squad
Jozef Tiso	Slovakia	October 13, 1887	President (1939–1945)	April 18, 1947	Executed by hanging
Hideki Tojo	Japan	December 30, 1884	Prime minister (1941–1944)	December 23, 1948	Executed by hanging
Philippe Pétain	Vichy France	April 24, 1856	Head of state (1940–1944)	July 23, 1951	Sentence commuted to life imprisonment
Imre Nagy	Hungary	June 7, 1896	Prime minister (1953–1955, 1956)	June 16, 1958	Executed by hanging
Patrice Lumumba	Congo-Léopoldville	July 2, 1925	Prime Minister (1960)	January 17, 1961	Executed by firing squad
Adnan Menderes	Turkey	1899	Prime minister (1950–1960)	September 17, 1961	Executed by hanging
Abdul-Karim Qasim	Iraq	November 21, 1914	Prime minister (1958-1963)	February 9, 1963	Executed by firing squad
Alphonse Massamba-Débat	Congo-Brazzaville	February 11, 1921	President (1963–1968); Prime minister (1963)	March 25, 1977	Executed by firing squad
Salim Rubaya Ali	South Yemen	June 17, 1934	President (1969–1978)	June 26, 1978	Executed by firing squad
Zulfikar Ali Bhutto	Pakistan	January 5, 1928	President (1971–1973); Prime minister (1973–1977)	April 4, 1979	Executed by hanging
Amir-Abbas Hoveyda	Iran	February 18, 1919	Prime minister (1965–1977)	April 7, 1979	Executed by firing squad
Ignatius Kutu Acheampong	Ghana	September 23, 1931	President (1972–1979)	June 16, 1979	Executed by firing squad
Francisco Macías Nguema	Equatorial Guinea	January 1, 1924	President (1968–1979)	September 29, 1979	Executed by firing squad
Maurice Bishop	Grenada	May 29, 1944	Prime minister (1979–1983)	October 19, 1983	Executed by firing squad
Celâl Bayar	Turkey	May 16, 1883	President (1950–1960); Prime minister (1937–1939)	August 22, 1986	Sentence commuted; released in 1964
Ferdinand Marcos	Philippines	September 11, 1917	President (1965–1986)	September 28, 1989	Sentence commuted; released in 22 October 1940
Nicolae Ceaușescu	Romania	January 26, 1918	President (1967–1989)	December 25, 1989	Executed by firing squad
Mohammad Najibullah	Afghanistan	August 6, 1947	President (1987–1992)	September 27, 1996	Executed by hanging
Jean-Bédel Bokassa	Central African Empire	February 22, 1921	Emperor (1976–1979); President (1966–1976)	November 3, 1996	Sentence commuted; released in 1993
Georgios Papadopoulos	Greece	May 5, 1919	Prime Minister (1967–1973); Regent (1972–1973); President (1973)	May 27, 1999	Sentence commuted to life imprisonment
Saddam Hussein	Iraq	April 28, 1937	President (1979–2003)	December 30, 2006	Executed by hanging
Émile Derlin Zinsou	Dahomey	March 23, 1918	President (1968–1969)	July 28, 2016	Convicted in absentia
Moussa Traoré	Mali	September 25, 1936	President (1968–1991)	September 15, 2020	Sentence commuted; released in 2002
Chun Doo-hwan	South Korea	January 18, 1931	President (1980–1988)	November 23, 2021	Sentence commuted; released in 1997
Pervez Musharraf	Pakistan	August 11, 1943	President (2001–2008)	February 5, 2023	Convicted in absentia. Ruling overturned by higher court.
Mengistu Haile Mariam	Ethiopia	May 21, 1937	Head of state (1977–1987); President (1987–1991)	Living	Convicted in absentia
Joseph Kabila	Democratic Republic of the Congo	June 4, 1971	President (2001–2019); Acting President (2001)	Living	Convicted in absentia
Sheikh Hasina	Bangladesh	September 28, 1947	Prime Minister (1996–2001; 2009–2024)	Living	Convicted in absentia
Bashar al-Assad	Syria	September 11, 1965	President (2000–2024)	Living	Convicted in absentia

== See also ==
- List of heads of regimes who were later imprisoned
