= Flag of Anjouan =

Anjouan
- Proportion: 2:3
- Adopted: 2012
- Design: A red field with a centered white crescent moon and four white stars

The flag of Anjouan, an island of Comoros, was adopted in 2012. It is a red field with a centered white crescent moon and four white stars.

== Historical flags ==
Flag of the Sultanate of Ndzuwani (pre-1833)

Flag of the Sultanate of Ndzuwani (1833–c. 1850)

Flag of the Sultanate of Ndzuwani (c. 1850)

Flag of the Sultanate of Ndzuwani (c. 1850–1893), flag of the separatist State of Anjouan, and later official flag (1997–2012)
