= John Mucknell =

- Born: c. 1608; Stepney, London
- Piratical career
- Years active: 1644–1651
- Base of operations: Isles of Scilly

John Mucknell (born c. 1608 in Stepney, London) was an English pirate in the 17th century. A staunch Royalist, he was knighted and appointed as a Vice Admiral by the future Charles II, and licensed as a privateer.

== Biography ==
Mucknell was born to Catholic parents in Stepney, in the East End of London, and baptised at St Dunstan's Church in September 1608. He and his wife Elizabeth later lived in the neighbouring parish of Poplar.

Mucknell became a ship's commander under the East India Company, a powerful firm trading between England and the East Indies. By 1643, Mucknell was unhappy with Puritan opinions and set sail on the John, a new East India Company 44-gun ship, bound for Surat. After marooning his enemies on a small island called Johanna, among the Comoros in the north end of the Mozambique Channel, Mucknell sailed first to Bristol and then to the Isles of Scilly.

There, Mucknell united and took control of local pirates and the John became the flagship. There were about 11 ships in the group. Mucknell operated in the English Channel and the Western Approaches between 1644 and 1651.

== Legacy ==
There are three extant first hand accounts from crew members of the John.

Todd Stevens, a shipwreck hunter, claims to have found the wreck of the John. English Heritage announced plans to dive the wreck in June 2012.

Stevens has written a book on the subject of Mucknell, The Pirate John Mucknell and the Hunt for the Wreck of the John.
