= 2008 invasion of Anjouan =

Military operation in the Comoros islands

- Map of the invasion of Anjouan
Date	March 25, 2008
Location	Anjouan, Comoros 12°15′S 44°25′E
Result	Comorian government and African Union victory
Territorial changes	The Comorian federal government reasserts control over Anjouan

Belligerents
African Union; Comoros; Senegal; Sudan; Tanzania; Logistical support: United States; France; Libyan Arab Jamahiriya	State of Anjouan

Commanders and leaders
A. A. Sambi	Mohamed Bacar

Strength
2,000; (Comoros) 500; (Tanzania) 750; (Sudan) 600; (Senegal) 150	500

Casualties and losses
None	3 killed 10 injured 100 arrested
- 11 civilians injured

The invasion of Anjouan (code-named Operation Democracy in Comoros), on March 25, 2008, was an amphibious assault led by the Comoros, backed by African Union (AU) forces, including troops from Sudan, Tanzania, Senegal, along with logistical support from Libya, France and the United States. The objective of the invasion was to topple Colonel Mohamed Bacar's leadership in Anjouan, an island in the Union of Comoros, when he refused to step down after a disputed 2007 election, in defiance of the federal government and the AU. The Comoros archipelago in the Indian Ocean has had a fractious history since its independence from France in 1975, experiencing more than 20 coups or attempted coups.

The invasion occurred in the early morning of March 25, 2008. The main towns were quickly overrun and the island was declared under the control of the invading forces the same day. Mohamed Bacar managed to escape to Mayotte on March 26 and requested political asylum. He was subsequently held in custody there by the French administration and brought to the island of Réunion. On May 15, France rejected Bacar's request for asylum, but the French refugee office ruled that the ousted leader could not be extradited to the Comoros because of the risk of persecution.

== Background ==
=== Tensions rise ===
The Comoran federal government delayed the holding of an election on Anjouan due to alleged irregularities and intimidation, but Bacar nevertheless printed ballots and held an election in June, claiming a landslide victory of 90 per cent. In July 2007, Bacar declared Anjouan to be independent of the Comoros.

=== Military build-up ===
In March 2008, hundreds of the Comoran Government troops began assembling on Mohéli, which is closer to Anjouan than the larger island, Grande Comore. Sudan and Senegal provided a total of 750 troops, while Libya offered logistical support for the operation. In addition, 500 Tanzanian troops were due to arrive soon after. France, the former colonial power, also assisted the operation by airlifting AU troops to the area.

Vows of resistance from the self-declared President of Anjouan were met with stern words from the AU envoy, saying "He will be overwhelmed...I am afraid to say that if he tries to do that, it will be the end of him physically, if necessary." In an interview with IRIN, Bacar said: "National President Ahmed Abdallah Mohamed Sambi does not know anything concerning the military, but if I had to advise him I would say that it's not the solution. The first time 1997 the army came we kicked them out. The second time May 2007 the army came we kicked them out. That means that if they try to come a third time we will kick them out."

Anjouan promised to hold new elections in May 2008, which South African President Thabo Mbeki supported as a way to resolve the crisis. Mbeki once more tried to stop the invasion on March 14 but the AU disregarded his proposal and the invasion went ahead.

=== Pre-invasion incidents ===
On March 3, 2008, a fuel ship supplying the Comoros Army caught fire in the port of Comoros' capital, Moroni. The cause of the fire was unknown. On March 11 an armed incursion occurred on the islands where three members of the Anjouan Militia loyal to President Bacar were captured and taken to Mohéli for interrogation. Diplomacy continued with an intervention by South African President Mbeki who attempted to delay the planned AU invasion to the distinct displeasure of the Comorian Government. It is understood that Mbeki spoke to the head of the AU, Tanzanian President Jakaya Kikwete, by phone on March 14 to stall the attempt to depose Bacar.

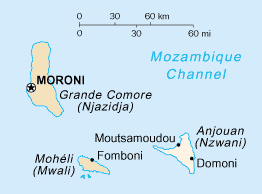
Location of Anjouan in the Comoros

Despite Mbeki's attempts to stop the invasion, a fishing boat with soldiers left Moheli for Anjouan on March 14. There were conflicting statements from both sides, with Comoran and AU military sources reporting that a fishing boat carrying around fifty soldiers from the Government of Comoros landed in southern Anjouan and attempted to capture a police station. In a later statement, Comoran Chief of Staff Salim Mohamed revised the information and said a reconnaissance team of about 10 soldiers landed on March 14 in the south of Anjouan island and reached the southern town of Domoni. A federal source said that two soldiers were wounded. "The target of the operation was the Domoni police station in Anjouan so as to free political prisoners," said the source.

The troops then retreated back to Mohéli and returned to Anjouan on Sunday 16 March to rescue the two wounded soldiers. According to a military source one federal soldier suffered an arm injury and another had a minor foot injury. The same sources reported that during the course of the operation "about twenty people" in Domoni died as a result of the Comoran and AU bombardment of Anjouanais positions. These facts were disputed by the Anjouan administration, which insisted that one of the two Comoran soldiers who had attacked Anjouanais positions in Domoni on March 15 had in fact died and that the police station was not captured. They stated that the Comoran and AU forces had been ambushed by Anjouanais forces during the early stages of their incursion at Domoni and had been forced to withdraw from what was a hopeless situation,

Contrary to its republican mission the National Army of Development (Comoran Army) devotes itself to taking innocent citizens as hostages whose only wrong is to be Anjouanese and not Sambist. In addition to the fishermen kidnapped at Marahare and Mromhouli, a second aggression [by] the National Army of Development dissident forces supported by the trawler provided by Iran failed. The elements of the [Anjouanese] Gendarmerie retaliated in self-defence, wounding two of the gangster attackers including one lethally.

France's role in the crisis was brought into question when, on March 19, a French police helicopter on an unauthorised, clandestine mission from the French-administered Comoro island of Mayotte crashed in the sea close to the city of Sima on Anjouan. Reports from officials in the Comoros said that no one was hurt in the crash. The helicopter was owned by France's Mayotte-based air and border police force. Critics allege the helicopter was involved in an attempt to bring Bacar into French exile, and that Bacar was only holding out so long because he was protected by the French. Lieutenant-Colonel Salimou Mohamed Amiri, Comoros Government Spokesman, declared:

We don't know what it was doing. You can imagine the rumors. The Government of Comoros did not allow them to come. They were not authorized ... The French said they sent other air and naval assets to pick up the crew.

The French military had already transported about 300 Tanzanian troops and 30 tons of freight to Grand Comore between March 14 and March 16. According to reports a French diplomat said that France was ready to transport Senegalese troops as well, but had not yet done so. The diplomatic source said France remains "favourable" to dialogue but on condition that Bacar accepts the presence of African troops at the port and airport of Anjouan.

== Invasion ==
On the morning of March 24, 2008, five boats transporting approximately 1,500 AU soldiers left the port of Fomboni, capital of the island of Mohéli. Bacar and his troops vowed to fight until the last man was left standing, with an Anjouan lieutenant stating, "We will fight until we die."

It was reported that the runway at Ouani Airport close to Mutsamudu was blocked with baggage trolleys and the atmosphere was tense as the island braced itself for the impending assault. Before the telephone lines were cut an Anjouan government spokesperson was quoted as saying: "They have decided to kill but we are not afraid. We are well prepared. Our forces are ready and it's going to work!"

About 450 troops landed on the north side of the Anjouan Bay at dawn on 25 March. The first shots were heard around 5 a.m. (GMT+3) on the island, in the town of Ouani, near the airport and the presidential residence. The combined forces quickly advanced on the town of Ouani to secure the airfield. The BBC reported that the island's capital, airport, seaport, and second city were all overrun by dawn, to scenes of jubilation from the local population. By mid-day, the presidential palace was deserted. But other journalists reported that the AU forces had "struggled to progress further under the automatic fire of Anjouan forces" and in the afternoon "clashes with heavy artillery continued to shake the town of Ouani." The army was reportedly looking for Bacar's hiding place.

"Colonel Mohamed Bacar has been spotted in the village of Sadanpoini where he is heading without doubt for a place to flee on board a kwassa (small canoe) towards Mayotte island, it seems, according to various sources, that he is dressed as a woman."
Abdourahim Said Bacar, Comoran Government Spokesman

After the airport was secured the invasion force apparently split where part of it headed south-west to engage Anjouanais loyalists in the capital, Mutsumudu, and the remainder headed south-east, capturing the port of Bambao M'Sanga and the second city of Domoni without resistance.

Early reports indicated that the Bacar government had fled to the interior of the island and were in hiding. However, later uncorroborated reports from the Comoros Government on March 25 stated that Bacar had fled the island incognito to seek exile in Mayotte. There was no comment from the Bacar government but the Comoran Government spokesperson said that the invasion troops had been told to look for him and were conducting house to house searches.

== Aftermath ==
Bacar managed to escape to Mayotte by speedboat, and reports on March 26 confirmed his presence on the island and stated he had requested political asylum in France. The Associated Press reported from Paris that France was considering the request for political asylum but Comoran leaders and anti-French protesters in Comoros demanded that France return Bacar to the Comoros. On March 27, Bacar was moved to the French island of Réunion, where he was charged and investigated for illegally entering French territory while carrying weapons, along with 23 of his followers. The case was rejected for procedural reasons, but Bacar and the 23 others remained in custody.

By the end of March, several prominent supporters of Bacar had been arrested, including Caabi El-Yachroutu, a former vice-president, Prime Minister, and Interim President of Comoros. Three others were found in hiding near Domoni on March 29, including Mohamed Abdou Mmadi (a former Minister of Transport and spokesman for Bacar), Ibrahim Halidi (a former Prime Minister and advisor to Bacar), and Ahmed Abdallah Sourette (a former President of the Constitutional Court).

On April 5, Bacar was remanded in custody. Comoran President Sambi visited Anjouan in early April, marking his first visit to the island since May 2007. He said that he hoped that separatism in Anjouan would cease with the removal of Bacar from power, and he praised the African leaders who had provided assistance for the invasion.

Contrary to previous reports that France was against the invasion, France gave its approval and helped to air-lift the African Union troops to the island. French Foreign Minister Bernard Kouchner stressed on April 8 that France had not supported Bacar or provided him with any protection, and that it had fully supported African Union intervention.

On April 18, Bacar, along with 21 of his close guards, was released from prison and returned to house arrest at the Réunion military airbase. On April 23, it was announced that the French Office of Protection of Refugees and Stateless Persons (Office français de protection des réfugiés et apatrides; OFPRA) had granted asylum to two of Bacar's men and refused asylum for six of them; those whose requests were rejected were to be sent to a third country and not returned to the Comoros due to fears of persecution. OFPRA had yet to rule on the cases of Bacar or his other men.

Bacar's asylum request was rejected on May 15. France's Secretary of State for Overseas, Yves Jégo, said France would support the Comoran Government's efforts. "We will continue to act in consultation with the Comoros so that the law can be applied and Colonel Bacar can be tried." Presidential elections in Anjouan occurred on June 15 and June 29. The election was won by Moussa Toybou, who defeated Mohamed Djaanfari in the second round.
