= 1997 Anjouan independence referendum =

Anjouan independence referendum
- 26 October 1997

Results
Choice	Votes	%
Yes	135,116	99.68%
No	439	0.32%
Valid votes	135,555	97.52%
Invalid or blank votes	3,444	2.48%
Total votes	138,999	100.00%
Registered voters/turnout	146,593	94.82%

An independence referendum was held on Anjouan, an island in the Comoros, on 26 October 1997. Over 99% of voters voted in favour of independence. However, the vote was not recognised and the island returned to the control of the Comorian government in 2001.

== Background ==
In July 1997 opposition parties were banned and Anjouan separatist leader Abdallah Ibrahim was arrested. His arrest led to rioting in Mutsamudu, the capital of Anjouan. Following the riots, militants from the Anjouan People's Movement took over the island, and declared independence on 3 August 1997. Ibrahim was released from prison and named President. At the same time, the island of Mohéli also declared independence.

On 3 October the Comorian army attempted to invade the island, but were repulsed by local troops. A referendum was subsequently called by Ibrahim despite opposition from the Organisation for African Unity and the Arab League.

== Results ==
Choice	Votes	%
For	135,116	99.68
Against	439	0.32
Total	135,555	100.00
Valid votes	135,555	97.52
Invalid/blank votes	3,444	2.48
Total votes	138,999	100.00
Registered voters/turnout	146,593	94.82
Source: Direct Democracy

== Aftermath ==
Following the referendum, Ibrahim was appointed head of a provision government of island, now renamed Nzwani. In mid-November he agreed to attend peace talks with Comorian president Mohamed Taki Abdoulkarim. After the talks fell through, Anjouan voters subsequently approved a draft constitution in a referendum in February 1998.

Following another failed attempt to reach agreement in 1999, agreement was reached between the Comorian government and the Anjouan separatists in 2001 to progress with a national referendum on a new federal constitution. This was approved by 76% of voters nationally, and 95% of voters on Anjouan.
