= Governor of Anjouan =

Head of autonomous island in Comoros

The Governor of Anjouan is the head of Anjouan, one of the three islands of the Union of Comoros. The position was firstly established as the President of Anjouan in 1997 after the Declaration of independence of Anjouan. Secondly the position became President of the autonomous island of Anjouan following the adoption of the Union of Comoros Constitution of 2001.

The first President of Anjouan was Foundi Ibrahim Abdallah from 1997 to 1999.

Saïd Abeid Abdérémane succeeded to Foundi Ibrahim Abdallah in 1999 and was President of Anjouan until August 2001, date of the military putsch by Mohamed Bacar.

Mohamed Bacar held the elected position from 14 April 2002 to 26 April 2007, when the country's Federal Constitutional Court declared his remaining in office after his term ended on 14 April illegal. Two days later, Comorian president Ahmed Abdallah Sambi appointed Kaambi Houmadi as interim President of Anjouan. Houmadi was replaced by Dhoihirou Halidi on 11 May 2007. This solution was rejected by Bacar, who held his own illegal elections in June which, unsurprisingly, he won in a landslide result of massive fraud. In February 2008 the Government of the Union of Comoros declared it had failed to find a diplomatic solution to the crisis and organised an armed intervention on 25 March 2008 which quickly seized back control of the island. Ikililou Dhoinine, one of the federation's vice presidents, was appointed as interim leader of Anjouan on 26 March 2008. On 30 March, Lailizamane Abdou Cheik, who was head of Anjouan's Court of Appeal (and was therefore the constitutional successor to the Presidency in the event of a vacancy), was appointed as Interim President; he was sworn in on 31 March.

Following the presidential elections held in June 2008, Moussa Toybou was sworn in as president on 5 July 2008.

The takeover of Anjouan by the Government of the Union of Comoros has indeed transformed the statute of President of Anjouan into the statute of Governor with limited privileges.

== Presidents of Anjouan (1997-2009) ==
- Foundi Ibrahim Abdallah (1997 - 1999)
- Saïd Abeid Abdérémane (1999 - August 2001)
- Mohamed Bacar (9 August 2001 - 14 April 2007) (1st time, following the military putsch of August 2001)
- Kaambi Houmadi (15 April 2007 - 10 May 2007) (interim)
- Dhoihirou Halidi (11 May 2007 - 14 June 2007) (interim)
- Mohamed Bacar (14 June 2007 - 25 March 2008) (2nd time (elected), deposed in 2008 invasion of Anjouan)
- Ikililou Dhoinine (26 March 2008 - 29 March 2008) (provisional)
- Lailizamane Abdou Cheik (30 March 2008 - 29 June 2008) (interim)
- Moussa Toybou (30 June 2008 - 2009) (elected)

== Governors of Anjouan (since 2009) ==
- Moussa Toybou (2009 - 26 December 2010)
- Anissi Chamsidine (27 December 2010 - 22 May 2016)
- Abdou Salami Abdou (23 May 2016 - 23 May 2019)
- Anissi Chamsidine (23 May 2019 - 23 May 2024)
- Zaidou Youssouf (since 24 May 2024)
