= Anjouan scops owl =

Conservation status
- Endangered (IUCN 3.1)
- CITES Appendix II

Scientific classification
- Kingdom: Animalia
- Phylum: Chordata
- Class: Aves
- Order: Strigiformes
- Family: Strigidae
- Genus: Otus
- Species: O. capnodes

Binomial name
- Otus capnodes (Gurney, JH Sr, 1889)

Species of owl

The Anjouan scops owl (Otus capnodes) is an owl endemic to the island of Anjouan in the Comoro Islands.

== Description ==
The Anjouan scops owl occurs in chocolate and rufous colour phases and has very small ear-tufts compared to other scops owls. The former has fine buff bars on the head and neck, a dark brown face with fine streaks and brown underparts with very fine brown streaks and vermiculations. The latter has abdomen markings that contrasts more with the plumage. Body length is 15 cm (5.9 in) and the wingspan is 45 cm (18 in).

=== Voice ===
The call of the Anjouan scops owl is a distinctive drawn-out whistle, which is repeated often with short interludes. It has been likened to the "pee-oo" call of the grey plover. The local name is "badanga".

== Distribution and habitat ==
The Anjouan scops owl is found only on the island of Anjouan, where it occurs in the remaining fragments of native upland forest, degraded forest and plantations. It appears to be dependent on large trees situated on steep slopes with cavities for nesting and roosting.

== Behaviour ==
Little is known, but it probably nests and roosts in tree cavities and feeds mainly on insects.

== Conservation and status ==
This species was rediscovered in June 1992, after an absence of records dating back to 1886. It has an estimated population of 2,300 – 3,600 mature individuals as of 2017. Upon its rediscovery, it was classified as "Critically Endangered" because its range is restricted to such a small area, which is being rapidly deforested. It was downlisted to Endangered in 2017, after a study indicated that previous population estimates of 100 – 400 individuals were considerable underestimates. Bristol Conservation and The Science Foundation have conducted surveys on the island to determine how many owls remained in 2009.
