= Mohamed Djaanfari =

Mohamed Djaanfari (1952 – February 21, 2020, in Aix-en-Provence France) is a politician in The Comoros. He is a retired French air force officer, local transportation tycoon and Vice-President of the Assembly of the Union of the Comoros. He contested the 2006 presidential elections and ended up losing badly to Ahmed Abdallah Mohamed Sambi. He received only 13.65% of the national vote on 14 May 2006, compared to Sambi's 58.02%.

Djaanfari is a deputy in the Assembly from Sima. He was a candidate in the June 2008 presidential election on Anjouan, losing to Moussa Toybou in a second round of voting. He received 47.58% of the vote against 52.42% for Toybou. However, it can be notices that in these elections organized under the Sambi regime, a lot of fraud and an illegal change of constitutional court after he ranked first in the first round were noted to the detriment of Mohamed Djaanfari and threats to the lives of citizens particularly in the Chissiwani region so that more than 300 people benefited from political asylum in France.
