= Said Abeid =

President of Anjouan from 1999 to 2001

Saïd Abeid Abdérémane served as the President of Anjouan from 1999 to August 2001, having led the breakaway movement from Comoros in 1997. He was preceded by Foundi Ibrahim Abdallah, who was usurped by Abeid after a couple days of street battles in September 1999. He was succeeded by Mohamed Bacar, following a putsch. In November 2001, he tried to regain power in a failed coup against Bacar, as he was opposed to Bacar's efforts to reunify with Comoros.
