= Mohamed Bacar =

President of Anjouan from 2001 to 2008

President of Anjouan
- In office 9 August 2001 – 26 March 2008
- Preceded by: Saïd Abeid Abdérémane
- Succeeded by: Ikililou Dhoinine (interim, post-invasion)

Personal details
- Born: May 5, 1962 (age 64) Barakani, Anjouan, State of Comoros, French Community (present-day Comoros)
- Party: Independent
- Profession: Military officer

Military service
- Allegiance: Comorian Armed Forces
- Branch/service: Gendarmerie
- Rank: Colonel

Colonel Mohamed Bacar (born May 5, 1962) is a Comorian former politician who was President of Anjouan, one of the three autonomous islands that make up the Union of the Comoros, from 2001 to 2008. He is a former chief of police on Anjouan and has studied extensively in France and the United States. He was part of a military coup on Anjouan in August 2001 and soon became president. It is alleged he rigged the elections to become the first president of Anjouan in March 2002, in part due to his leading role in the separatist movement. He was ousted by the combined forces of the Government of the Union of Comoros and the African Union in the March 2008 invasion of Anjouan.

== Presidency disputed ==
On April 26, 2007, the country's Federal Constitutional Court proclaimed the Presidency of Anjouan vacant, declaring Bacar's period in office after his first term ended on April 14 to be illegal. Two days later, Comorian President Ahmed Abdallah Sambi, with the support of the African Union (AU), appointed M. Dhoihirou Halidi as interim President of Anjouan. However, he was never allowed to take office and Bacar, in defiance of both the Union of Comoros government and the AU, independently organised a presidential election. The Union government withheld election material from Anjouan to try and prevent the poll from taking place, but Bacar printed his own ballot papers, went ahead with the vote on 10 June and claimed a landslide victory of 90 percent. He was inaugurated for a second term as the President of Anjouan on 14 June.

Both the AU and the Union government said if an election were held on Anjouan it would be declared "illegal". Bacar's inauguration ceremony deepened the electoral crisis, making it highly unlikely that the official Anjouan poll, postponed to 17 June, would be held.

In his inauguration speech, Bacar declared himself "the president of all Anjouan" and appealed to the Union government "not to throw oil onto the fire".

France, the country's former colonial power, expressed its support for the Union government and the AU stance against Bacar in a statement released on 15 June, and noted that the 10 June election was only the first round in the presidential elections, with the second round scheduled for 24 June.

The statement urged Bacar to respect the 17 June date for holding Anjouan's official election, and allow it to be supervised by AU troops and monitored by international observers.

Since this time the situation had deteriorated markedly and the government of Comoros determined that talks had failed and a military solution was required. During February and March 2008 troops from the Comoros with support from the African Union began massing for an amphibious assault of the island of Anjouan and the termination of the presidency of Mohamed Bacar. Agence France-Presse reported that 'the first batch' of African Union troops arrived in the Comoros Islands on March 20, 2008, while the BBC reported that the first African Union troops arrived on March 11, 2008.

In an interview with Agence France-Presse on March 12, 2008, Bacar said that he had "always been open to dialogue" and that there should be a round table to discuss Comoran problems. He said that holding a new election in Anjouan would be acceptable if a round table was in favor of it. According to Bacar, some of the countries backing military intervention are undemocratic themselves, and it was hypocritical for them to try to "give [Anjouan] lessons in democracy"; he said that an invasion would ultimately solve nothing and that he was ready to fight and die if necessary.

== Removal from office ==
A tense period punctuated by several incidents of military incursions on Anjouan continued from the beginning of March with notable events including an abortive Comoron raid on Domoni in the south of the island, the seizure of two Anjouan soldiers on the coast close to Sima and the crash of a French military helicopter also near Sima. The end came when, in the early hours of March 25, the island was invaded by a combined Comoros and African Union force. The island's capital, airport, seaport and second city were all overrun by dawn to scenes of jubilation from the local population. Early reports indicated that the government of Mohamed Bacar had fled to the interior of the island and were in hiding; however, later reports from the Comoros government on March 25 stated that Bacar had fled the island incognito seeking exile in Mayotte:

Colonel Mohamed Bacar has been spotted in the village of Sadanpoini where he is heading without doubt for a place to flee on board a kwassa (small canoe) towards Mayotte island, it seems, according to various sources, that he is dressed as a woman.

— Abdourahim Said Bacar, Comoran government spokesman

Soon afterwards, the French government confirmed that Bacar had fled to Mayotte. He requested that France grant him political asylum, and the French government said that it was considering the request. The Comoran government asked France to hand him over so that it could put him on trial; it had issued an international arrest warrant for Bacar. Subsequently, the French moved Bacar to the nearby island of Réunion on the night of March 27–28, along with 23 of his supporters who accompanied him when he fled to Mayotte. It was thought that he would be charged on Réunion with weapons possession and illegal entry due to his arrival on Mayotte by speedboat. Comoran President Ahmed Abdallah Sambi said that if the French objected to extraditing Bacar to Comoros, where the death penalty is allowed, then it could send him to the International Criminal Court in The Hague for trial. Thousands of Comorans participated in a protest on March 28 to demand that Bacar be extradited; it was widely believed in the Comoros that France secretly worked to protect him. In its extradition request, the Comoran government accused Bacar of "embezzlement of public funds, homicide, rape, torture and other abuses against the people of Anjouan".

The case against Bacar and his 23 supporters, based on illegal entry and weapons possession, was dismissed by a court in Saint-Denis, Réunion on March 29. However, they were ordered to be placed in administrative detention; they were kept at air base 181. An order (reconduite à la frontière) to expel Bacar and his men back to the Comoros was issued on March 28, but it was subsequently revoked. On March 31, Bacar and his men requested political asylum. Bacar's lawyers also requested a temporary residence permit for them, but this was rejected by the court in Saint-Denis. On April 1, a new order was signed for the expulsion of Bacar and his men. At a court hearing on April 2, Bacar said that he had "confidence in French justice"; his lawyers said that they would appeal the order for his expulsion.

On April 2, the Assembly of the Union of the Comoros accused France of taking Bacar from Anjouan to Mayotte. Replying to this allegation, French Foreign Ministry spokesman Pascale Andréani said on April 3 that Bacar had managed to flee Anjouan "under unclear circumstances". Andréani said that Bacar was under house arrest on Réunion and that his request for asylum was being reviewed. On April 5, he and his men were detained at the request of the Saint-Denis public prosecutor. Bacar was moved to a different cell on April 7 due to threats he had received from other inmates.

Bacar appealed his detention, and on April 18 the Saint-Denis Court of Appeal ordered that he and his men be released, although they were to be kept under house arrest at air base 181. The Comoran government was given "until May 4 to send a file documenting its extradition request". Reports on May 15 said France rejected Bacar's request for asylum. Nevertheless, the French refugee office ruled that he could not be extradited to Comoros because of the risk of persecution. France's State Secretary for Overseas, Yves Jégo, said France would support the Comoran government's efforts. "We will continue to act in consultation with the Comoros so that the law can be applied and Col Bacar can be tried."

In his trial for weapons possession and illegal entry at the Saint-Denis Court of Appeal, Bacar's lawyers argued that Bacar and his men had needed the weapons for self-defense when they traveled from Anjouan to Mayotte and that they had surrendered the weapons to the police on Mayotte upon arrival. On June 5, 2008, Bacar was acquitted on the charge of illegal entry but was given a suspended sentence of three months imprisonment for entering the country with weapons.

On June 24, 2008, the Saint-Denis Court of Appeal ruled against extraditing Bacar to the Comoros. With all his appeals exhausted, Bacar, his brother, and two of his men were expelled from Réunion on the morning of July 19. They were taken to Cotonou, Benin, on a French government flight; the Beninese government had agreed to allow Bacar to stay in Benin. Bacar said that on this occasion that he intended to stay there for as long as his presence was allowed, and he expressed a desire to "reflect on our past errors". Comoran government spokesman Abdourahim Said Bakar said that the government was "disappointed" by the expulsion of Bacar to Benin, reiterating the government's position that he should face trial in the Comoros or before an international court.

== Embargo ==
With the decree (EG) Nr. 243/2008 from 17. March 2008 the European Commission introduced restrictive measures against Bacar's former government. All financial and commercial resources of Mohamed Bacar, Jaffar Salim, Mhamed Abdou Madi, Ali Mchindra, Houmadi Souf, Rehema Boinali, Dhoihirou Halidi and Abdou Bacar are frozen. This also affects all companies, corporations, foundations and so on of these persons. Every payment or financial or commercial help to these people has to be approved. A person who gives money or other resources to these people may be prosecuted in Germany as a criminal according to § 34 Abs. 4 Nr. 2 German foreign trade law. Other European countries have different laws on this purpose.

Preceded by Saïd Abeid Abdérémane	President of the Autonomous Island of Anjouan (Union of Comoros); 2002–2008	Succeeded by Mohamed Dhoihirou Halidi
