= List of members of the Pan-African Parliament =

Below is a list of the MPs that make up the African Union's Pan-African Parliament, the respective countries they are elected from, and their political party. The members served during the 2004 to 2009 period.

== Algeria ==
In Algeria members of the Pan African Parliament include :

- Boudina Mustapha
- Draoui Mohamed
- Kara Baya
- Chara Bachir
- Hammi Larouiss

== Angola ==
In Angola the members of parliament include :

- Domingos Manuel Njinga
- Efigênia dos Santos Lima Clemente
- Fernando José de França Dias Van-Dúnem (MPLA)
- Jerónimo Elavoko Wanga (UNITA)
- Abel Epalanga Chivukuvuku (UNITA)

== Benin ==
Members of parliament in Benin include :

- Théophile Nata
- Rosine Vieyra Soglo - Benin Rebirth Party (RB)
- Orou Gabé Orou Sego
- Ismaël Tidjani Serpos
- Madeleine Achade

== Botswana ==
In Botswana members of parliament are listed below :

- Mosaraela Goya – Botswana Democratic Party (BDP)
- Ronald Koone Sebego - Botswana Democratic Party (BDP)
- Isaac Mabiletsa – Independent
- Dikgang Makgalemele – (BDP)
- Tshelang Masisi – (BDP)
- Nehemiah Mmoloki Moduble
- Boyce Sebetela
- Maitlhoko Mooka

== Burkina Faso ==
Members of parliament in Burkina Faso include :

- Oubkiri Marc Yao (deceased)
- Larba Yarga
- Marie Blandine Sawadogo
- Bénéwendé Stanislas Sankara
- Gilbert Noël Ouédraogo
- Yamba Sawadogo
- Joséphine Drabo Kanyoulou

== Burundi ==
Burundi members of Parliament include :

- Pierre Claver Nahimana
- Jean-Baptiste Manwangari
- Schdrack Niyonkuru
- Christian Sendegeya
- Marie-Thérèse Toyi
- Zaïtuni Abdallah

== Cameroon ==
Cameroonian members of parliament include :

- Essomba Tsoungui Elie Victor
- Imbia Sylvester Itoe
- Mbonda Elie
- Mbah Ndam Joseph Njang

== Cape Verde ==
In Cape Verde members of parliament include :

- José Manuel Gomes Andrade
- Orlanda Maria Duarte Santos Ferreira
- Mário José Carvalho de Lima
- João Baptista Ferreira Medina
- Eva Verona Teixeira Ortet

== Central African Republic ==
In Central African Republic members of parliament include :

- Jean-Baptiste Nouganga
- Jean-Marie Mokole
- Anne-Marie Goumba
- Marie Agba-Otikpo
- Jean-Benoît Gonda

== Chad ==
In Chad members of parliament include :

- Idriss Ndele Moussa
- Elise Loum
- Ngarindo Milengar
- Mbaydoum Simeon
- Delwa Kassiré Koumakoye

== Republic of the Congo ==
In the Republic of the Congo members of parliament include:== Source:

- Jean-Pierre Thystère Tchicaya
- Jean-Claude Siapa Ivouloungou
- Mélanie Komzo
- André Obami-Itou
- Zely Pierre Inzoungou-Massanga

== Djibouti ==
- Safia Elmi Djibril
- Abdallah Barkat Ibrahim
- Halo Mohamed Ibrahim
- Houssein Mohamed Ali
- Mahamoud Moustapha Daher

== Egypt ==
- Abdel Ahad Gamal El Din
- Georgette Sobhi Kaliny
- Mostafa El Guendy
- Mamdouh Hosny Khalil
- Mohammed Ragab Ahmad

== Equatorial Guinea ==
- Pilar Buepoyo Boseka
- Vicente Ehate Tomi
- Francisco Garcia Gaetjens
- Fidel Marcos Mane Ncogo
- Carmelo Mocong Onguene

== Ethiopia ==
- Dawit Yohannes (Deceased)
- Halie-Kiros Gessesse
- Mubarek Sani
- Aster Bekele
- Mulualem Bessie

== Gabon ==
- Henriette Massounga
- René Radembino Coniquet
- Simon Boulamantri
- Pierre Claver Zeng Ebome
- Séraphin Moundounga

== The Gambia ==
- Fabakary Jatta – Government – Alliance for Patriotic Reorientation and Construction
- Halifa Sallah – Opposition – People's Democratic Organisation for Independence and Socialism
- Kalifa Kambi – Government – Alliance for Patriotic Reorientation and Construction
- Bintanding Jarju – Government – Alliance for Patriotic Reorientation and Construction
- Mammah Kandeh – Government – Alliance for Patriotic Reorientation and Construction

== Ghana ==
- Edward K. Doe Adjaho (2009–)
- Ambrose P. Dery (2009–)
- Enoch Teye Mensah (2009–)
- Moses Asaga (2009–)
- Elizabeth Agyemang (2009–)

== Guinea ==
- Koumbia Diallo Boubacar
- Kante El Hadj Dia
- Aribot Belly
- Ghussein El Hadj Ismaila Mohamed
- Somparé Boubacar

== Guinea Bissau ==
Source:

== Kenya ==
- Danson Mungatana of UDA party
- Esther Passaris of ODM party
- Margaret Kamar of Jubilee Party
- Joseph Majimbo of Ford Kenya
- Rahab Mukami of UDA Party

== Lesotho ==
- Oziel Hlalele Motaung
- Malebaka Flory Bulane
- Letuka Nkole
- Thabang Nyeoe
- Khauhelo Deborah Raditapole

== Liberia ==
- Joyce Musu Freeman-Sumo – Congress for Democratic Change (CDC)
- Armah Z. Jallah – (CDC)
- Henry Yallah – Unity Party (UP)
- George T. Tengbe – (UP)
- Eugene Fallah Kparkar – Liberty Party (LP)

== Libya ==
- Abdulla Edriss Ebrahim
- Amal Nuri Safar
- Aragab Muftah Abudabus
- Mohammed Lutfi Farhat
- Mohammed El-hadhiri

== Madagascar ==
- Rajemison Rakotomaharo
- Jean Lahiniriko
- Rasoanirina Méline
- Raberson Jeannot Emilien
- Philippson Gérard Aimé

== Malawi ==
- Simon Vuwa Kaunda
- Callista Chimombo
- Louis Chimango
- Steven Malamba
- Lovenes Gondwe

== Mali ==
- Ibrahim Boubacar Keïta – Opposition – Rally for Mali
- Mountaga Tall
- Ascofare Oulematou Tamboura
- Moustapha Dicko – Government – Alliance for Democracy in Mali
- Sidibe Korian Sidibe

== Mauritania ==
- Habib Ould Diah
- Diop Hamady Khalidou
- Mohamed El Moustapha Ould Bedr Eddine
- Bakar Ould Ahmedou
- Diyé Ba

== Mauritius ==
- Premnath Ramnah
- José Arunasalon
- Marie Noelle Françoise Labelle
- Ashit Kumar Gungah
- Arvin Boolell

== Mozambique ==
- Macamo Veronica Nataniel
- Dique Enoqe Maria Angelina
- Munhawa Sousa Salvador
- José Gabriel Manteigas
- Eduardo Joaquim Mulémbwè

== Namibia ==
- Peter Katjavivi - South West Africa People's Organization (SWAPO)
- Loide Kasingo - (SWAPO)
- Bernard Sibalatani - (SWAPO)
- Evelyn Nawases-Taeyele - (SWAPO)
- Arnold Tjihuiko - National Unity Democratic Organisation (NUDO)

== Niger ==
- Mounkaïla Aïssata
- MaÏdagi Allambèye
- Hassoumi Massoudou
- Alhousseïni Algoubass
- Mahamane Saley

== Nigeria ==
- Danboyi Usman
- Lee Maeba
- Mohammed Kumalia
- Bankole Dimeji
- Patrica Ndogu

== Rwanda ==
- Jeanne d’Arc Nyinawase – Liberal Party (LP)
- Gallican Niyongana – Social Democratic Party (SDP)
- Agnès Mukabaranga – Christian Democratic Party (CDP)
- Tharcisse Shamakokera – Rwandan Patriotic Front (RPF)
- Juliana Kantengwa – (RPF)
- Emmanuel Niyigena [Rwandan]

== Sahrawi Arab Democratic Republic ==
- Sueilma Beiruk – Popular Front for the Liberation of Saguia el-Hamra and Río de Oro (POLISARIO)
- Jamal el-Bendir – (POLISARIO)
- Salek Abderrahman – (POLISARIO)
- Seniya Ahmed Marhba – (POLISARIO)
- Fatma Sidi Nafi – (POLISARIO)

== Senegal ==
- Emile Diatta
- Babacar Gaye
- Ibra Diouf
- Abdoulaye BA
- Aminata Mbengue Ndiaye

== Seychelles ==
- Wavel Ramkalawan
- Simon Gill
- Sylvanne Lemiel
- Terence Mondon
- Regina Esparon

== Sierra Leone ==
- Sheik I. Kamara
- Baba-Jigida
- Dauda Kamara
- Ibrahim Kemoh Sessay
- Abu Mbawa Kongobah

== Somalia ==
- Asha Hagi Elmi
- Mahamoud Bashi Issa
- Yusuf Mohamed Abdi
- Farah Ismail Hussein
- Fahma Ahmed Nur
- shakaph hussein ali
- Dr. Mohamed Aden Jeelle

== South Africa ==
In South Africa the members of parliament include the following:

- Refilwe Mtshweni-Tsipane – Government – African National Congress
- Mdumiseni Ntuli – Government – African National Congress
- Mergan Chetty – Government – Democratic Alliance
- Duduzile Zuma-Sambudla – Opposition – uMkhonto weSizwe
- Vuyani Pambo – Opposition – Economic Freedom Fighters

== South Sudan ==
- Albino Aboug – Government – Sudan People's Liberation Movement
- Emmanuel Lowilla – Government – Sudan People's Liberation Movement
- Domai Gatpan Kulang – Government – Sudan People's Liberation Movement
- Sophia Pal Gai – Government – Sudan People's Liberation Movement
- Mabior Riiny Lual – Opposition – South Sudan Opposition Alliance

== Sudan ==
- Awad Haj Ali Ahmed (2012 to 2016)
- Bísa Adam
- Sayed Angelo Beda
- Ibrahim Ahmed Ghandor
- Idris Yousif
- Su'ad al-Fatih al-Badawi
- Malik Hussain Hamid

== Eswatini ==
- Marwick Khumalo
- Mphiwa Dlamini
- Michael Temple
- Nokukhanya Gamedze
- Tsandzile Dlamini

== Tanzania ==
- Dr. Gertrude Ibengwe Mongella
- Omar Sheha Mussa
- Athumani Saidi Janguo
- Prof. Feethan Filipo Banyikwa
- John Momose Cheyo

== Togo ==
- Fambaré Natchaba Ouattara
- Solitoki Magim Esso
- Ptomsoouwé Batchassi
- Loumonvi Fombo
- Améyo Adja

== Tunisia ==
- Sahbi Karoui
- Mohamed Salah Zaray
- Saida Agrebi
- Badreddine Missaoui
- Jalel Lakadar

== Uganda ==
- Cecilia Ogwal – Uganda People's Congress (UPC)
- Sam Otada – Independent
- Beatrice Rusaniya – National Resistance Movement (NRM)
- Sarah Kataike – (NRM)
- Onyango Kakoba – (NRM)

== Zambia ==
- Lucky Mulusa – Movement for Multi-Party Democracy (MMD)
- Mutinta Mazoka – United Party for National Development (UPND)
- Dorothy Kazunga – Patriotic Front (PF)
- Davis Mwango – (PF)
- Patrick Mucheleka – Independent

== Zimbabwe ==
- Joram Gumbo – Zimbabwe African National Union – Patriotic Front (ZANU-PF)
- Fortune Charumbira – (ZANU-PF)
- Kokerai Rugara – Movement for Democratic Change – Tsvangirai (MDC-T)
- Editor Matamisa – (MDC-T)
- Maxwell Dube – Movement for Democratic Change – Ncube (MDC)
