= Baya, Afghanistan =

Baya, Afghanistan may refer to:

- Bayah, Afghanistan, a town in Badghis Province
- Baya, Sar-e Pol, a village

== See also ==
- Baya (disambiguation)
- Bayah (disambiguation)
