= Bureau of the Pan-African Parliament =

Leadership of the Pan-African Parliament (PAP)

The Bureau of the Pan-African Parliament is the essential leadership of the Pan-African Parliament (PAP), consisting of one President and four Vice-Presidents.

The President and each Vice-President represent a different region of Africa. The current members of the Bureau are:

- Acting President –Hon. Ashebir Gayo from Ethiopia
- Third Vice-President – Hon. Lucia Passos from Cape Verde

The Bureau is responsible for:

- The management and administration of the affairs and facilities of Parliament and its organs.
- Regulating the procedures relating to the financial, organisational and administrative needs in accordance with Financial Rules of the AU and matters concerning Members and the internal organisation of Parliament and its organs.
- Determining the draft agenda and the programmes of the sessions of Parliament.
- Determining the establishment, plan and structure of the Secretariat and lay down regulations for the staff, including their terms and conditions of service.
- Proposing to Parliament for adoption the establishment and job descriptions of its support staff.
- Proposing, to the Pan African Parliament, the appointment of the Clerk and Deputy Clerks to Parliament.
- The preparation of the draft budget and its presentation to the responsible Committee.
- Coordinating and harmonising the functions of Permanent Committees.
- Any other matters in accordance with the directives issued by Parliament.

Carrying out any other functions as may be prescribed by Parliament or incidental to these functions.

== List of presidents ==
No.	Image	President	Took office	Left office	State	Party
1		Gertrude Mongella; Mongella Bureau	May 2004	May 2009	Tanzania	Chama cha Mapinduzi
2		Idriss Ndele Moussa; Moussa Bureau	May 2009	28 May 2012	Chad	Patriotic Salvation Movement
3		Bethel Nnaemeka Amadi; Amadi Bureau	28 May 2012	27 May 2015	Nigeria	People's Democratic Party
4		Roger Nkodo Dang	27 May 2015	1 March 2021	Cameroon	Cameroon People's Democratic Movement

== List of Bureaus with representatives by region ==
Legend: President - Vice-president

No.	Mandate	Eastern Africa	Central Africa	Western Africa	Northern Africa	Southern Africa
1	2004–2009	Gertrude Mongella; Tanzania	Elise Loum; Chad	Jerome Sacca Kina Guezere (2004–2005); Benin Theophile Nata (2005–2009); Benin	Mohammed Lutfi Farhat; Libya	Fernando Dias Van-Dúnem; Angola
2	2009–2012	Mary Mugyenyi (2009–2011); Uganda Francoise Labelle (2011–2012); Mauritius	Idriss Ndele Moussa; Chad	Bethel Nnaemeka Amadi; Nigeria	Laroussi Hammi; Algeria	Joram Macdonald Gumbo; Zimbabwe
3	2012–2015	Juliana Kantengwa; Rwanda	Roger Nkodo Dang; Cameroon	Bethel Nnaemeka Amadi; Nigeria	Moustafa El Gendy; Egypt	Loide L. Kasingo; Namibia
4	2015–2018	Ashebir W. Gayo; Ethiopia	Roger Nkodo Dang; Cameroon	Bernadette Lahai; Sierra Leone	Suilma Hay Emhamed Saleh; Western Sahara	Eduardo Joaquim Mulembwe; Mozambique
5	2018–present	Stephen Masele; Tanzania	Roger Nkodo Dang; Cameroon	Haidra Cisse; Mali	Bouras Djamel; Algeria	Chief F. Z. Charumbira; Zimbabwe

== See also ==
- Pan-African Parliament
