= List of the first women holders of political offices =

This is a list of political offices which have been held by a woman, with details of the first woman holder of each office. It is ordered by country, by dates of appointment. Former countries, such as Yugoslavia, are also listed.

== International organizations ==
=== African Union ===
- President of the Pan-African Parliament – Gertrude Mongella – 2004 (at its founding)
- Vice President of the Pan-African Parliament – Elise Loum – 2004
- Chairperson of the African Union Commission – Nkosazana Dlamini-Zuma – 2012

=== European Union ===
- President of the European Parliament – Simone Veil – 1979
- President-in-Office of the European Council – Margaret Thatcher – 1981
- European Commissioner – Christiane Scrivener / Vasso Papandreou – 1989
- Leader of the Socialist Group and of any major party – Pauline Green – 1994
- Co Vice-President of the European Commission – Loyola de Palacio – 1999
- First Vice-President of the European Commission – Margot Wallström – 2004
- High Representative of the Union for Foreign Affairs and Security Policy – Catherine Ashton – 2009
- President of the European Commission – Ursula von der Leyen – 2019

=== League of Nations ===
- Substitute Delegate and Ambassador to the League of Nations – Elena Văcărescu – 1922
- Permanent Delegate and Ambassador to the League of Nations – Elena Văcărescu – 1924

=== United Nations ===
- Head of the section of Welfare Policy – Alva Myrdal – 1949
- Chairman of UNESCO's social science section – Alva Myrdal – 1950
- President of the United Nations General Assembly – Vijaya Lakshmi Pandit – 1953
- Permanent Representative – Agda Rössel (Permanent Representative of Sweden to the United Nations) – 1958
- Head of the United Nations Children's Fund – Carol Bellamy – 1995
- United Nations High Commissioner for Human Rights – Mary Robinson – 1997
- Deputy Secretary-General – Louise Fréchette – 1998
- Executive Director of the United Nations Human Settlements Programme – Anna Tibaijuka – 2000
- Under-Secretary-General – Inga-Britt Ahlenius – 2005
- Assistant-Secretary-General – Helvi Sipilä – 1972
- President of the International Court of Justice – Rosalyn Higgins – 2006
- Administrator of the United Nations Development Programme – Helen Clark – 2009
- Managing Director of the International Monetary Fund – Christine Lagarde – 2011

== See also ==
- Council of Women World Leaders
- List of elected and appointed female heads of state and government
- List of the first LGBT holders of political offices
- List of the first women heads of government and state in Muslim-majority countries
- Muslim women political leaders
- Women in government
