= Mohamed Salah (disambiguation) =

Mohamed Salah (born 1992) is an Egyptian footballer who plays as a forward for the Egypt national team.

Mohamed Salah may also refer to:

== Sports ==
- Mohamed Salah Jedidi (1938–2014), Tunisian professional footballer
- Mohamed Salah (footballer, born 1956), Egyptian former professional footballer and head coach of Pharco FC
- Mohamed Salah Abo Gresha (born 1970), Egyptian professional footballer, most notably for Ismaily SC
- Mohamed Salah Elneel (born 1991), Qatari professional footballer
- Mohamed Salah (Indian footballer) (born 1994), Indian professional footballer
- Mo Salah (footballer, born 2004), Belgian professional footballer
- Mohammed Sallah (footballer, born 2006), Gambian professional footballer

== Politics ==
- Mohamed Salah Dembri (1938–2020), Algerian politician, former Minister of Foreign Affairs
- Mohamed Salah Mzali (1896–1984), Tunisian politician, former Prime Minister of Tunisia
- Mohamed Salah Zaray, Tunisian politician, Tunisian delegate to Pan-African Parliament
- Mohamed Salah al-Din Zaidan, de facto leader/general emir of Al-Qaeda

== Others ==
- Mohamed Salah Ben Mrad (1881–1979), Tunisian theologian, journalist and intellectual
- Mohamed Salah El Azab (born 1981), Egyptian writer and novelist
- Mohammad Salah, village in Iran
