= Suzanne Vos =

South African politician

- Occupation: Politician
- Known for: Member of the Pan-African Parliament and committee rapporteur
- Office: Member of Parliament (South Africa)
- Political party: Inkatha Freedom Party
- Board member of: South African Broadcasting Corporation (SABC)

Suzanne Vos was a South African politician. She was a member of the Inkatha Freedom Party and Parliament.

Vos was also a member of the Pan-African Parliament and rapporteur of the Committee on Transport, Industry, Communications, Energy, Science and Technology, one of its Permanent Committees. Vos is currently sitting on the board of the South African Broadcasting Commission (SABC).
