= Bouras Djamel =

Algerian politician

Acting President of the Pan-African Parliament
- In office August 2020 – June 2022
- Preceded by: Roger Nkodo Dang
- Succeeded by: Fortune Z. Charumbira

3rd Vice President of the Pan-African Parliament for North Africa
- Incumbent
- Assumed office May 10, 2018

Personal details
- Born: 1971–1972 (age 49) Algeria

Bouras Djamel is an Algerian politician and the Third Vice President of the Pan-African Parliament representing the Northern African Region. He was designated Acting President starting in August 2020, with his term set to end when the full Bureau of the PAP is reconstituted at the start of the next plenary session.
