= Sawadogo =

Sawadogo is a Burkinabè surname and may refer to:

- Aboubacar Sawadogo (born 1989), Burkinabè international footballer
- Adama Sawadogo (born 1990), Burkinabè international footballer
- Bienvenu Sawadogo (born 1995), Burkinabè sprinter specialising in the 400 metres
- Cilia Sawadogo (born 1965), Canadian-Burkinabè-German filmmaker
- Clément Sawadogo, Burkinabè politician, Minister of the Civil Service, Labour and Social Security in Burkina Faso
- Faysal Sawadogo (born 1996), Burkinabè taekwondo practitioner
- Isaka Sawadogo (born 1966), Burkinabè actor
- Mahama Sawadogo (1954–2017), Burkinabè politician, former President of the CDP Parliamentary Group in the National Assembly of Burkina Faso
- Malik Sawadogo (born 2003), Burkinabè-Swiss footballer
- Marie Blandine Sawadogo, member of the Pan-African Parliament from Burkina Faso
- Salimata Sawadogo (born 1958), former chair of the African Commission on Human and Peoples' Rights
- Siméon Sawadogo, Burkinabè politician
- Souleymane Sawadogo (born 1995), Burkinabè footballer
- Tindwende Sawadogo (born 1995), Burkinabè Olympic swimmer
- Yacouba Sawadogo (1946–2023), Burkinabè farmer and agronomist
- Yamba Sawadogo, Burkinabè politician

== See also ==
- Sławutówko
- Zawadówka (disambiguation)
