= Abu Mbawa Kongobah =

Sierra Leonean politician

Paramount Chief Abu Mbawa Kongobah is a Sierra Leonean politician. He is a member of the Pan-African Parliament and the Paramount Chief from Kono District. In the Pan-African Parliament, he is in the Committee on Rural Economy, Agriculture, Natural Resources, and Environment.
