= Mahamane =

Mahamane is a given name. Notable people with the name include:

- Mahamane Cissé (born 1993), Nigerien football player
- Mahamane Haidara (1910–1981), Malian politician
- Mahamane Kalil Maiga (born 1948), Malian scientist and politician
- Mahamane Ousmane (born 1948), Nigerien politician, fourth President of Niger
- Mahamane Saley, Nigerien politician
- Mahamane Touré (born 1954), Malian general
- Mahamane Traoré (born 1988), Malian football midfielder
