= Baya =

Baya may refer to:

== Ethnic groups ==
- Gbaya people, ethnic group in the Central African Republic

== People ==
- Baya (artist) (1931–1998), Algerian artist
- Baya Rahouli (born 1979), Algerian athlete
- Kara Baya, member of the pan-African parliament
- Raymond Ramazani Baya (1943–2019), Democratic Republic of Congo politician
- Zoubeir Baya (born 1971), Tunisian football player
- Paulo Baya, Brazilian footballer

== Biology ==
=== Animals ===
- Baya (leafhopper), a leafhopper genus in the tribe Erythroneurini
- The baya weaver, a bird species found in South and Southeast Asia
- The Finn's baya, a bird species found in the Ganges valley of India

=== Plants ===
- Baya, a synonym for the Portuguese baga (grape) variety

== Places ==
- Baya, Côte d'Ivoire, a village in Côte d'Ivoire
- Baya, Ganassi, an inactive volcano in Lanao del Sur province, Philippines
- Baya, Iran, a village in Kurdistan Province, Iran
- Baya, Qazvin, a village in Qazvin Province, Iran
- Baya, Mali, a commune in the Cercle of Yanfolila in the Sikasso Region of Mali
- Baya, Togo, a village in the Bassar Prefecture in the Kara Region of north-western Togo
- Baya, Sar-e Pol, Afghanistan
- Baya river, the name of a river in the Begusarai district of the Bihar state, India
- Baya, an alternative name for Kipoi, Ioannina, a village in Greece

== Beverages ==
- Baya, a rice wine from the northern Philippines also known as tapuy

== Military ==
- USS Baya (SS-318), a U.S. Navy submarine

== Music ==
- "Baya al Ward" (song), a 2006 single by Amal Hijazi
- Baya al Ward, a 2006 album by Amal Hijazi
- Baya, the lower drum in a pair of tabla

== See also ==
- Bayah (disambiguation)
- Bayas
- Bayas River
