= Committee on Rules =

Committee on Rules or Rules Committee

- Committee on Rules, Privileges, and Discipline, one of the ten permanent committees of the Pan-African Parliament
- Philippine House Committee on Rules
- Philippine Senate Committee on Rules
- United States House Committee on Rules
- United States Senate Committee on Rules, 1874–1947
- United States Senate Committee on Rules and Administration, 1947–present
- Canadian Senate Standing Committee on Rules, Procedures and the Rights of Parliament
- Rules Committee (Parliament of India)
