= Marie Agba-Otikpo =

Central African Republic politician

Marie Adba-Otikpo
- Agba-Otikpo in a meeting, summer 2007

Representative for Ngaoundaye First District
- In office 1999–2000

Personal details
- Born: Marie Belkine; 1 December 1948 Bocaranga, Central African Republic
- Died: April 2021 (aged 72)

Marie Belkine (1 December 1948 – April 2021), commonly known as Marie Agba-Otikpo, was a Central African Republic politician. She was a member of the National Assembly and the head of the Defence and Security Commission (CDS).

== Early life and education ==
Agba-Otikpo was born on 1 December 1948 in Bocaranga. At the start of her career, Agba-Otikpo practiced as a social worker and was employed at the Central African Republic embassy in Paris as an advisor in social affairs.

== Political career ==
Aligning herself with President Ange-Félix Patassé, Agba-Otikpo was elected to the National Assembly as the MLPC representative for Ngaoundaye first district in 1998. She received 76.3 percent of the votes, and served as the administrator of the assembly from 1999 to 2000. Agba-Otikpo was reelected on 8 May 2005. She was a member of the Pan-African Parliament from 2005 to 2011, and a member of the Committee on Health, Labour and Social Affairs. She was defeated at the 2011 parliamentary election.

Agba-Otikpo was also a member of REFPAC (Network of Central African Women Parliamentarians) in 2007. On April 29, 2015, Agba-Otikpo reestablished the Ministry of Public Security after the April 2015 Bangui police strike. At the time of the police strike, Agba-Otikpo was in charge of the Commission of Defense and Security for the National Transitional Council (CNT).

In the 2015-16 general election, Agba-Otikpo ran for the 2nd Ngaoundaye riding of Ouham-Pendé for the Party for Democratic Governance. After a runoff election in April 2016, she was defeated by Antoine Koirokpi.

She died in April 2021.
