= Kalil =

Kalil is a surname. Notable people with this surname include:

- Alexandre Kalil (born 1959), Brazilian politician
- Antônio Petrus Kalil (1925–2019)
- Ariel Kalil (born 1969), American psychologist
- Frank Kalil (born 1959), American American football player
- Haley Kalil (born 1992), American model
- Leonardo Kalil Abdala, Brazilian football player
- Mahamane Kalil Maiga (born 1948), Malian scientist and politician
- Matt Kalil (born 1989), American American football player
- Ryan Kalil (born 1985), American American football player
- Thomas Kalil (born 1963), American politician
