= Ndam =

Ndam or NDAM may refer to

- Ndam language of Chad
- National Democratic Action Movement
- Ndam (surname)
