= Sylvester Itoe Imbia =

Cameroonian politician

Sylvester Itoe Imbia is a member of the Pan-African Parliament from Cameroon.

== See also ==
- List of members of the Pan-African Parliament
