= Uebert Angel =

Ministry founder, televangelist, businessman

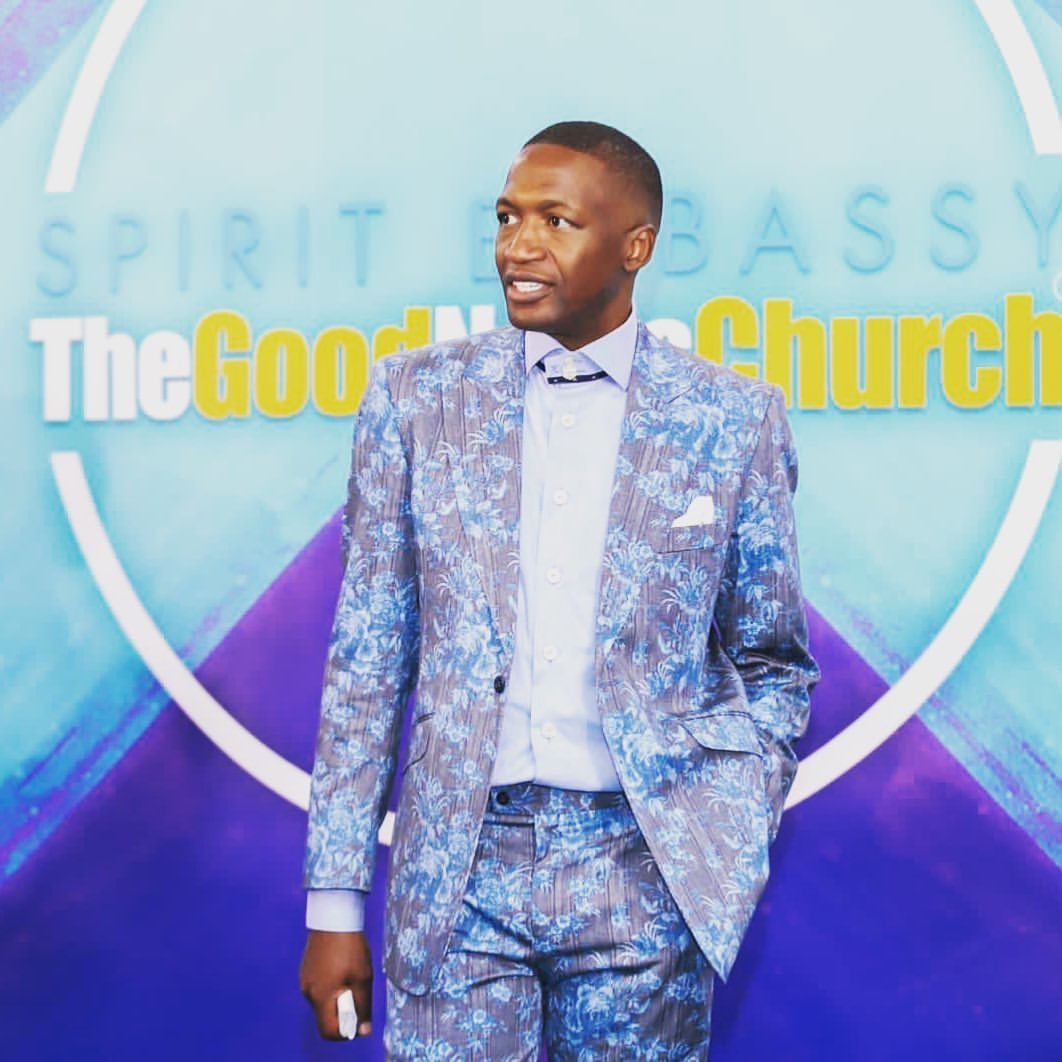
- Uebert Angel speaking in London, UK 2021
- Born: Uebert Mudzanire; 6 September 1978 (age 48); Fort Victoria, Rhodesia
- Occupations: Ministry founder, televangelist, businessman, Ambassador
- Spouse: Beverly Angel
- Website: www.uebertangel.org

Uebert Angel (born Uebert Mudzanire; 6 September 1978) is a British-Zimbabwean Businessman and a preacher. He is an evangelical preacher and the founder of Spirit Embassy, a Pentecostal ministry in the United Kingdom.

He is also the Presidential Envoy and Ambassador At Large for the country of Zimbabwe to Europe and the Americas. He is commonly referred to as Prophet Angel and also formerly known as Uebert Angel Mudzanire. The church was founded in 2007 as "Spirit Embassy" and in October 2015 it rebranded its name to "Good News Church", retaining "Spirit Embassy" as a term for Angel's overall ministry.

Described as "a young charismatic prophet", Angel travels by helicopter to preach the message that God wants his flock to be rich, as rich as he is. He is also the founder of The Angel Organisation which is the parent company for his other business interests.

Angel has been critiqued for advocating prosperity theology through his sermons, teachings and writings, or the prosperity gospel, a pseudo-theological belief that the reward of financial and material gain is the divine will of God for all pious Christians.

== Identity ==
Angel's true identity has been subject of debate. A Zimbabwean newspaper claimed that he uses two national identification cards with different birthdays. The same paper also revealed that his British passport uses a different birthday than the one submitted when registering companies.

== Life and education ==
Angel was born and grew up in Masvingo, Zimbabwe and later moved to Manchester, England, where he founded the Spirit Embassy ministry in 2007. Angel has two financial degrees, one post-graduate degree in education from University of Bolton, and a Masters in Entrepreneurship from the University of Edinburgh.

== Ministry and prosperity theology ==
In October 2015 the Spirit Embassy ministry re-branded its name to the "Good News Church" (sometimes referred to as "Spirit Embassy Good News Church"). The church ministry attracted numerous followers and there are currently 70 branches in over 15 different countries in Europe, Africa and the US. Angel has also launched Miracle TV and Good News TV where he carries out regular speaking engagements and broadcasts programs on behalf of the Good News Church. He is also the founder and president of Osborn Institute of Theology, an online Bible school which was launched in August 2012.

Angel has been critiqued for advocating prosperity theology through his sermons, teachings and writings, or the prosperity gospel, a pseudo-theological belief that the reward of financial and material gain is the divine will of God for all pious Christians. Thus, his ministry appears to be indirectly promoting tithing and prosperity theology in a very persuading manner. This is similar to the doctrines of other mega churches, televangelists, and several prominent figures associated with prosperity theology.

Angel has been in the center of multiple scams and controversies throughout his ministry and various charities, leading to him being called a 'fraudster' or a 'false prophet'. Despite attempts to brush the allegations aside, there have been various accusations nevertheless, which have been both financial and sexual in nature.

== Business activities ==
Angel founded Club Millionaire Limited in 2005, providing concierge services in Britain. He entered the real estate business developing residential properties and later moved to commercial establishments, land and building acquisition, as well as buying and selling of properties. In 2008 he founded Sam Barkeley Construction and The Angel Organisation, the parent company for his business interests, of which he currently is CEO. He also runs other business enterprises under the parent company, including Brits Bank and Atom Mobile. He is also the founder of The Millionaire Academy, whose stated purpose is to instruct individuals how to become successful entrepreneurs and run businesses of their own.

In 2014, a Radio Station in Zimbabwe claimed to have access to an "unedited Forbes Magazine story" detailing Uebert Angel's wealth. Angel is involved in a number of commercial real estate projects including the transformation of an old West Midlands Cinema and nightclub into a theatre style events centre. Another UK project is the building of Angel's office headquarters in Lincolnshire, East Midlands.

== Ambassadorial role ==
In March 2021 Angel was appointed as the nation of Zimbabwe's Ambassador at Large and Presidential Envoy by Zimbabwean president H.E. President Emmerson Mnangagwa. The ambassadorial role came with the responsibility for Angel to seek trade and investment opportunities for the country of Zimbabwe. Since being appointed Angel has embarked on a number of projects.

In July 2023, Angel was appointed as the Ambassador for Interfaith Dialogue and Humanitarian Affairs at the Pan African Parliament (PAP) of the African Union. In August 2023 he was dismissed from that role by the acting president of the PAP, Gayo Asherbiri, who justified Angel's firing in a letter stating that Angel's appointment as ambassador was illegal.

== Fraud allegation ==
The accusation defrauded a Bentley Continental from the owner, which was valued at over $300,000. It was assumed that Angel fled to the UK in 2015 to avoid arrest warrants in Zimbabwe over summons issued regarding these allegations. In February 2016, the arrest warrant was cancelled by the Harare provincial magistrate, Vakayi Chikwekwe.

== Al-Jazeera investigation on gold smuggling ==
Uebert Angel was cleared by Zimbabwe's Financial Intelligence Unit (FIU) of all accusations made by Al Jazeera's Investigative Unit in March 2023. The investigation by Al Jazeera had alleged that Angel was abusing his diplomatic privileges to facilitate a global money laundering operation. According to the report, this operation involved channeling illicit funds into Zimbabwe, exchanging them for gold sourced from Zimbabwean mines, and selling the gold abroad for clean money. Al Jazeera's undercover reporters, posing as potential clients, recorded Angel allegedly saying, "You want gold, gold we can do it right now, we can make the call right now, and it’s done." However, subsequent investigations by the FIU found no evidence to substantiate these claims, clearing Angel of wrongdoing.

Preacher Jerome Fernando who claims to be a prophet who Uebert appointed to head the Glorius Church in Sri Lanka denied allegations and threatened legal action against accusers. Uebert and Jerome also had met with members of the Rajapaksa family during preaching sessions with Jerome and were given military protection under the Rajapaksa administration.

== Humanitarian activities ==
Angel and his wife Beverly Angel have both been involved in charity work since the launch of his church in 2007. He helps poor families in Africa and Asia by providing monthly groceries and paying the tuition fees of children through his "Adopt a Family" scheme. In November 2015, he founded Uebert Angel Foundation with his wife which helps poor students by providing scholarships, and tuition fees for education. He is also founder of Free Earth Humanitarian Organisation which works to ensure that underprivileged people have their basic needs for living met. In January 2020 the Angels paid school fees for an entire school of 797 students at Kadyamadare Primary School in the Chikwaka Communal Lands in Zimbabwe. This was done again through Uebert Angel's charity arm the Uebert Angel Foundation (UAF). The foundation followed this up in February when they did the same for 1026 students at Bota Primary School in Masvingo, paying their school fees including levies – for the whole year.

During the COVID-19 pandemic the Uebert Angel Foundation (UAF) executed a number of charitable projects which started with $15,000 in mealie meals to feed vulnerable families in Chitungwiza, Zimbabwe. That was followed one month later when UAF donated bags of mealie meal and cooking oil to vulnerable members of his 5000 strong branch of Spirit Embassy: GoodNews Church in Harare, Zimbabwe.
