= Mbaydoum Simeon =

Chadian politician

Mbaydoum Simeon is a member of the Pan-African Parliament from Chad.

== See also ==
- List of members of the Pan-African Parliament
