= Committee on Justice and Human Rights =

Committee of the Pan-African Parliament

The Committee on Justice and Human Rights is one of the eleven permanent committees of the Pan-African Parliament. It is in charge of law and justice issues in Africa.

Functions of the committee:

- Assist Parliament in its role of harmonising and coordinating the laws of Member States.
- Promote respect for and develop sound principles of freedom, civil liberties, justice, human and peoples' rights and fundamental rights within the Union.

Chairperson of the committee is the Hon Abdelahad Gamaleldin (Egypt).

The deputy chairperson is the Hon Efigênia dos Santos Lima Clemente (Angola).

Rapporteur of the committee is Hon Abdu Katuntu (Uganda).

== See also ==
- Permanent Committees of the Pan-African Parliament
