= Chara Bachir =

Algerian politician

Chara Bachir (Arabic: شارة بشير) is an Algerian politician. Bachir is a member of the Pan-African Parliament from Algeria, beginning in 2004.

== See also ==
- List of members of the Pan-African Parliament
