= Jerónimo Elavoko Wanga =

Angolan politician

Minister of Education Transitional Government
- In office 1975–?
- President: Agostinho Neto
- Preceded by: None

Second Vice President of the National Assembly
- In office ?–?

Member of the Pan-African Parliament
- In office 2004–2007

Personal details
- Born: April 24, 1934 Bié Province, Angola
- Died: April 3, 2007 (aged 72) Johannesburg, South Africa

Jerónimo Elavoko Wanga (24 April 1934 - 3 April 2007) was an Angolan politician who was a member of the Pan-African Parliament from 2004 until his death in 2007. Born in 1934 in the Bié Province, Wanga studied mathematics and originally worked as a teacher. He was later elected in Bié's electoral circle. When Angola gained independence from Portugal in 1975, Wanga served as the Minister of Education for the Transitional Government. He was also the second vice president of the National Assembly where he was, among other functions, the chief of the UNITA parliamentary group.

== See also ==
- List of members of the Pan-African Parliament
