= Oubkiri Marc Yao =

Burkinabé politician (1943–2024)

Oubkiri Marc Yao (1943 – 11 October 2024) was a Burkinabé politician and a member of the Pan-African Parliament from Burkina Faso. He was also First Vice-President of the National Assembly of Burkina Faso, and Ambassador of Burkina Faso to the Soviet Union, Denmark, and Ghana. Yao died on 11 October 2024.

== Biography ==
In 2007, while Oubkiri Marc Yao was 1st Vice-President of the National Assembly and Vice-President of the Congress for Democracy and Progress (CDP), Oubkiri Marc Yao withdrew from the national list of CDP candidates for the legislative elections of May 2007. Oubkiri Marc Yao is also considered one of the ideologues of former President Blaise Compaoré. He was also a member of the Pan-African Parliament and First Vice-President of the National Assembly of Burkina Faso. Marc Oubkiri Yao died on 11 October 2024, from illness.

== See also ==
- List of members of the Pan-African Parliament
