= 2003 Nigerian Senate elections in Taraba State =

2003 Nigerian Senate election in Taraba State

The 2003 Nigerian Senate election in Taraba State was held on April 12, 2003, to elect members of the Nigerian Senate to represent Taraba State. Ambuno Zik Sunday representing Taraba North, Abdulazeez Ibrahim representing Taraba Central and Danboyi Usman representing Taraba South all won on the platform of the Peoples Democratic Party.

== Overview ==
Affiliation	Party		Total
Affiliation	PDP	AD	Total
Before Election			3
After Election	3	0	3

== Summary ==
District	Incumbent	Party	Elected Senator	Party
Taraba North			Ambuno Zik Sunday	PDP
Taraba Central			Abdulazeez Ibrahim	PDP
Taraba South			Danboyi Usman	PDP

== Results ==
=== Taraba North ===
The election was won by Ambuno Zik Sunday of the Peoples Democratic Party.

2003 Nigerian Senate election in Taraba State
Party	Candidate	Votes	%
PDP	Ambuno Zik Sunday		
Total votes			
PDP hold			

=== Taraba Central ===
The election was won by Abdulazeez Ibrahim of the Peoples Democratic Party.

2003 Nigerian Senate election in Taraba State
Party	Candidate	Votes	%
PDP	Abdulazeez Ibrahim		
Total votes			
PDP hold			

=== Taraba South ===
The election was won by Danboyi Usman of the Peoples Democratic Party.

2003 Nigerian Senate election in Taraba State
Party	Candidate	Votes	%
PDP	Danboyi Usman		
Total votes			
PDP hold			
