= Tsoungui =

Tsoungui is a surname. Notable people with the surname include:

- Antef Tsoungui (born 2002), Belgian footballer
- Elie Victor Essomba Tsoungui, Cameroonian politician
- Linda-Philomène Tsoungui (born 1992), German drummer
- Marc Tsoungui (born 2002), Cameroonian footballer
