= Domingos Manuel Njinga =

Angolan politician

Domingo Manuel Njinga is a member of the Pan-African Parliament from Angola, beginning in 2004.

== See also ==
- List of members of the Pan-African Parliament
