= Fateh Boutbig =

Algerian politician

- فاتح بوطبيق
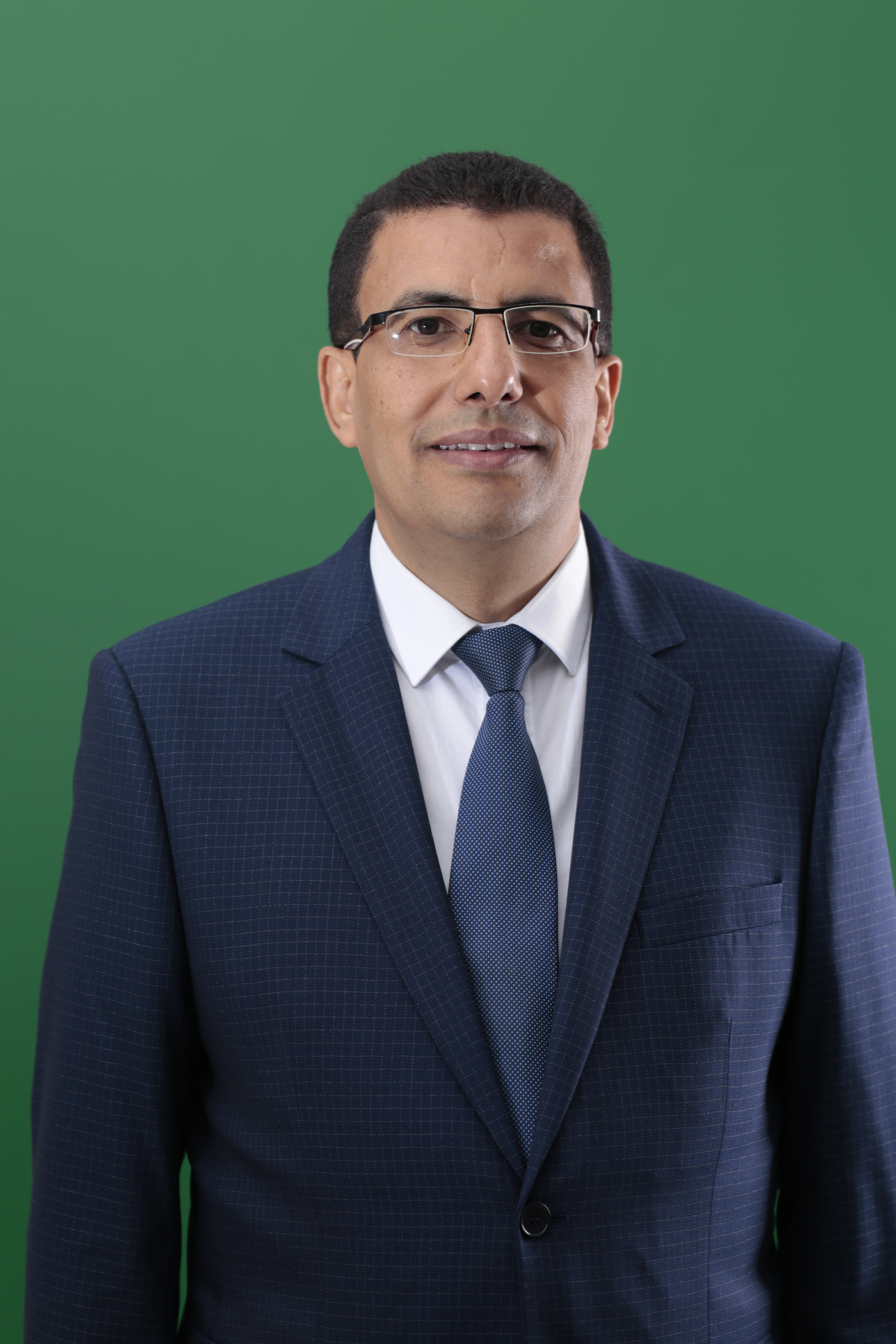
- Boutbig in 2021

President of the Pan-African Parliament
- Incumbent
- Assumed office 30 April 2026
- Preceded by: Fortune Z. Charumbira

Member of the Council of the Nation
- Incumbent
- Assumed office 2 April 2026
- Appointed by: Abdelmadjid Tebboune

President of the Future Front
- Incumbent
- Assumed office January 2024
- Preceded by: Abdelaziz Belaïd

Member of the People's National Assembly
- In office 12 June 2021 – March 2026
- Constituency: Algiers

Personal details
- Born: Fateh Boutbig
- Party: Future Front
- Education: University of Algiers

Fateh Boutbig (Arabic: فاتح بوطبيق, romanized: Fātiḥ Būṭbīq) is an Algerian politician and lawyer serving as President of the Pan-African Parliament from 30 April 2026.

== Life ==
Boutbig obtained a bachelor's degree in Law from the University of Algiers in 2000, and a master's degree in 2007. He later earned a PhD in Law. He also shortly studied psychology, and obtained a degree in media from Arab Center for Radio and Television Training in 2004.

Boutbig worked as an administrative assistant at the Algiers Port Authority.

== Politics ==
Boutbig was active in the National Union of Algerian Youth. Between 2002 and 2004, Boutbig served as National Secretary for Students and Academic Activities.

Boutbig served as a member of the People's National Assembly since 2021. In January 2024, Boutbig was endorsed as president of the Future Front party, succeeding Abdelaziz Belaïd.
