= Ngarindo Milengar =

Chadian politician

Ngarindo Milengar is a member of the Pan-African Parliament from Chad.

== See also ==
- List of members of the Pan-African Parliament
