= Nehemiah Mmoloki Moduble =

Nehemiah Mmoloki Moduble is a member of the Pan-African Parliament from Botswana.

== See also ==
- List of members of the Pan-African Parliament
- Politics of Botswana
