= Yargo Department =

Coordinates: 12°4′N 0°17′W

Yargo
- Department
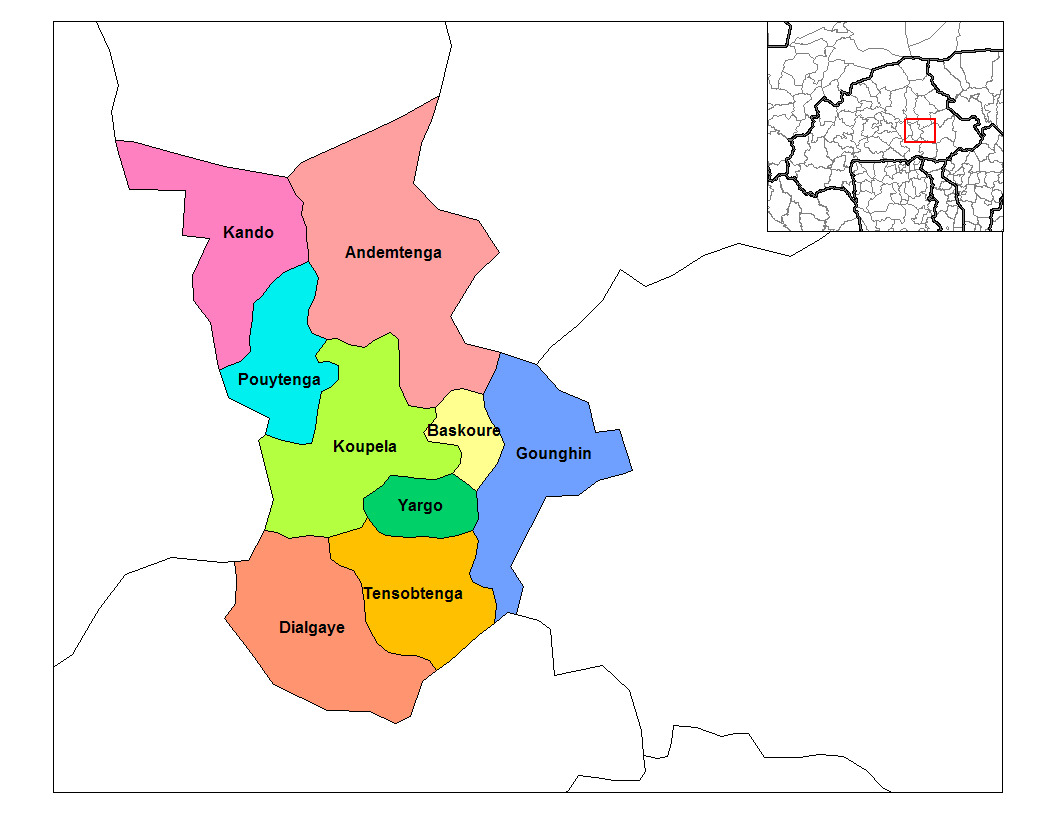
- Yargo Department location in the province
- Country: Burkina Faso
- Province: Kouritenga Province

Area
  - Total: 44.5 sq mi (115.3 km^{2})

Population (2019)
  - Total: 19,965
  - Density: 448.5/sq mi (173.2/km^{2})
- Time zone: UTC+0 (GMT 0)

Yargo is a department or commune of Kouritenga Province in eastern Burkina Faso. Its capital lies at the town of Yargo. According to the 1996 census the department has a total population of 14,473.

== Towns and villages ==
- Yargo (1 014 inhabitants) (capital)
- Balbzinko (783 inhabitants)
- Balgo (1 680 inhabitants)
- Bissiga (647 inhabitants)
- Bissiga-Peulh (29 inhabitants)
- Daltenga (991 inhabitants)
- Kamsansin (362 inhabitants)
- Kanougou (646 inhabitants)
- Kokossé Tandaga (883 inhabitants)
- Kokossin Nabikome (898 inhabitants)
- Lilyala (575 inhabitants)
- Pissi-Sebgo (965 inhabitants)
- Poétenga (1 216 inhabitants)
- Sawadogo (373 inhabitants)
- Silmaiougou-Boumdoundi (1 110 inhabitants)
- Silmiougou-Peulh (202 inhabitants)
- Silmiougou-Yarcé (850 inhabitants)
- Tandadtenga (506 inhabitants)
- Zanrin (740 inhabitants)
