= Orou Gabé Orou Sego =

Beninese politician

Orou Gabé Orou Sego is a member of the Pan-African Parliament from Benin, beginning in 2004.

== See also ==
- List of members of the Pan-African Parliament
