= Bayah =

Bayah may refer to:

- Bay'ah, an Islamic oath of allegiance
- Bayah, Afghanistan
- Bayah, Iran
- Bayah, Philippine Highlands Rice Wine, also known as Tapuy

== See also ==
- Baya (disambiguation)
- Bayas
