= Elie Mbonda =

Cameroonian politician

Elie Mbonda is a politician in Cameroon. He is also a member of the Pan-African Parliament where Elie is a member of the Health, Labor and Social Affairs Committee. While not in politics, Elie is a member of the faculty at University of Yaoundé. His research focuses on Mother and Child Health, Paediatrics, Medicine and Biomedical Sciences.

== See also ==
- List of members of the Pan-African Parliament
