= Halo Mohamed Ibrahim =

Djiboutian politician

- Born: November 15, 1986 (age 39); Dorra, Djibouti
- Occupation: Politician

Halo Mohamed Ibrahim (born November 15, 1986) is a Djiboutian politician who served as a member of the Pan-African Parliament representing Djibouti and the Parliament of Djibouti as the rapporteur for the Commission for Social Development and Environmental Protection.

She is the eldest of five children and attended college in Malaysia before earning a bachelor's degree in Business Administration Marketing, working for such companies as DHL, Construction Alliance, Golden Africa, and Haro International.
