= Pilar Buepoyo Boseka =

Equatoguinean politician

Pilar Buepoyo Boseka is an Equatoguinean politician. She is a member of the Pan-African Parliament for Equatorial Guinea. She was the Vice-Minister of Health and Environment from 1999 to 2001.
