= Abdallah Barkat Ibrahim =

Djiboutian politician

- Occupation: Politician

Abdallah Barkat Ibrahim is a Djiboutian politician. He served as a member of the Pan-African Parliament representing Djibouti and the Parliament of Djibouti as the Chairman of the Committee on Legislation, General Administration and Human Rights.
