= Jalel Lakadar =

Tunisian politician

Jalel Lakadar is a member of the Pan-African Parliament, representing Tunisia.
