= Ndam (surname) =

Ndam or N'Dam is a Cameroonian surname. Notable people with the surname include:

- Adamou Ndam Njoya (1942–2020), Cameroonian politician, lawyer, author, and professor
- Hassan Ndam (born 1998), Cameroonian football defender
- Hassan N'Dam N'Jikam (born 1984), Cameroonian-French professional boxer
- Joseph Mbah Ndam, Cameroonian politician
