= Abdulla Edriss Ebrahim =

Libyan politician (died 2004)

Abdulla Edriss Ebrahim (died 2 August 2004) was a member of the Pan-African Parliament from Libya.
