= Mélanie Komzo =

Republic of the Congo politician

Mélanie Komzo is a Republic of the Congo politician. She is a member of the Pan-African Parliament.
