= Zely Pierre Inzoungou-Massanga =

Congolese politician

- Occupation: Politician

Zely Pierre Inzoungou-Massanga is a Congolese politician. He served as Representative of the Chairman and Deputy Chairperson of the Committee on Rules, Privileges and Discipline while a member of the Pan-African Parliament. He also occupied the Niari Department spot in the Republic of Congo Senate for the Action and Renewal Movement.
