= Draoui Mohamed =

Algerian politician

Draoui Mohamed (Arabic: دراوي محمد) sits on the Committee on Education, Culture, Tourism and Human Resources a permanent committee of the Pan-African Parliament, while also sitting on the Pan-African Parliament representing Algeria beginning in 2004.

== See also ==
- List of members of the Pan-African Parliament
