= Awad Haj Ali =

Sudanese academic (born 1954)

Awad Haj Ali Ahmed (Note: His name is sometimes written Awad Haj Ali, Awad Hag Ali, or Awad Hag Ali Ahmed. His name on publications is often A.H.A. Ahmed and A. H. Ahmed.) (born January 1954 in Portsudan, Sudan) Is a Sudanese academic. He has been an educator, vice chancellor of Neelain University for more than ten years, and director of the Sudanese Central Bureau of Statistics. He was a member of the Pan-African Parliament (PAP), and a chairperson of the Eastern Caucus of the PAP.

== Biography ==
He was awarded a PhD in computer science by Newcastle University in 1981. Ahmed's main area of study and research is Computing Science, and his minor fields are Mathematics and Statistics.

He was a professor of Computer Science. He was the vice chancellor of Neelain University 1997-2005 and 2008-2010. Ahmed is also a former director of the Sudanese Central Bureau of Statistics and he was the census controller of the 2008 Sudanese Census. From 2012 to 2016, he was a member of the Pan African Parliament and he was a chairperson of the Eastern Caucus of the Pan African Parliament.

Ahmed's employment at Al-Neelain University was terminated in 2020. Then the university after a while apologized to prof Awad and has returned to his position as an emeritus professor.
