= Malebaka Flory Bulane =

Mosotho politician

Malebaka Flory Bulane is a member of the Pan-African Parliament from Lesotho.
