= Mamdouh Hosny Khalil =

Egyptian politician

Mamdouh Hosny Khalil or Mamdouh Hosni Khalil (born 7 November 1964) is an Egyptian politician.

He received a university qualification of Bachelor of Civil Engineering. He was the chief executive officer of Alex. Steel Group which manufactured pre-engineered steel buildings, and operated a steel service center, and a sheet metal works.

As a member of the Egyptian People's Assembly he is the director of the Industry and Energy Committee. He is also a member of the Pan African Parliament belonging to the Committee on Transport, Industry, Communications, Energy, Science and Technology In his political affiliation with the National Democratic Party (NDP) he is a member of Policy Committee and Energy Committee.

== Personal life ==
His hobbies include volleyball and tennis. He is a member of Alexandria Business Men Association, the Rotary Club of Alexandria and the Alexandria Sporting Club.
