= Ragab Muftah Abudabus =

Libyan politician

Ragab Muftah Abudabus (Arabic: رجب مفتاح بودبوس) (aka: Ragab Budabuss or Ragab Budabbus) is a member of the Pan-African Parliament from Libya.

According Afrigate News and Alwasat Libya agency, professor Rajab Abu Dabus was born in Benghazi, in 1941.

He studied primary school at Al-Nahda School "Torelli" in 1953, and secondary school at Benghazi Secondary School for Boys "Martyrs." January" located on Gamal Abdel Nasser Street, Benghazi, during the years 1956–1965. Then he joined the Libyan University, Faculty of Arts, Department of Philosophy and Sociology, during the period between 1965 and 1968.

He was the founder and director of the Korina School of Arts student magazine from 1967 to 1970, a prominent peer-reviewed cultural magazine that had a prominent position in the Libyan negotiations.

He obtained a diploma in the French language, a master's degree in philosophy, and a diploma in studies. In-depth philosophy, doctorate in philosophy and sociology.

In the field of translation from French, he published an introduction to philosophy, The Rise and Fall of the Great Powers, Veral on the Republic, Marxism and Capitalism - A Brief History of the Battle of the Age, After Communism the Fall of Capitalism, After the Empire, The Great Game and Western Ambitions in The Arab Levant, the trial of globalization "three parts", the end of work "three parts", the state liberalism.

He graduated with a doctorate in philosophy from the University of Aix-en-Provence in France and held several administrative and academic positions.

He has held a number of positions, including: - Head of the Department of Philosophy, Garyounis University, 1977.

- Secretary of the People's Committee for Scientific Research, Garyounis University, 1984. -Secretary of the People's Committee for Scientific Affairs, Garyounis University, 1985. -Secretary of the Human Sciences Center 1986. -Secretary of the People's Committee for Information and Culture 1987–1990 President and coordinator of the Green Amphitheater 1991.

In December 2016, he was released after six years in prison after his arrest in October 2011 due to his political views.

His death was announced on February 11, 2022, following a heart attack, leaving behind sadness in the Libyan and Arab intellectual, and cultural circles.
