= Mahamoud Moustapha Daher =

Djiboutian politician

- Occupation: Politician

Mahamoud Moustapha Daher is a Djiboutian politician who has served as a member of the Pan-African Parliament representing Djibouti and the Parliament of Djibouti as the Minister of National Education and Vocational Training.
