= Ndella Paye =

French Afro-feminist and Muslim theologian

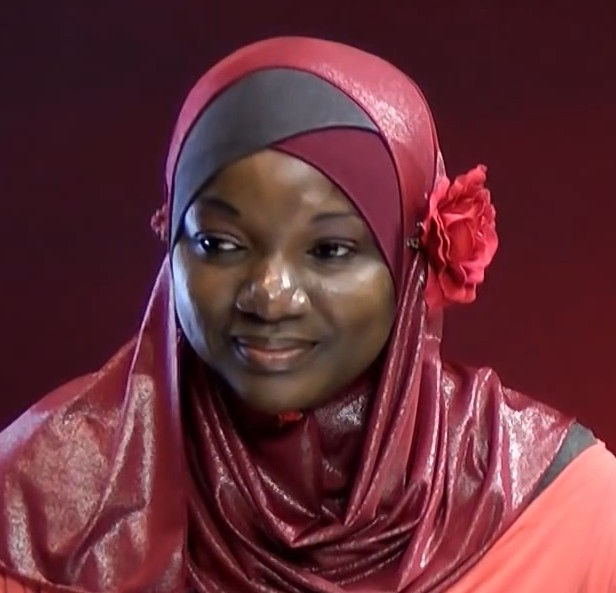
- Ndella Paye in 2013
- Born: 1974 (age 51–52); Senegal
- Education: École pratique des hautes études

Ndella Paye Diouf (born c. 1974) is a militant French Afro-feminist and Muslim theologian who was born in Senegal. She has fought against the requirement for young Muslim women to wear the hijab in French schools but has above all sought full equality between the races and between men and women. She has been particularly intent on ensuring a successful future for her three daughters, giving them self-confidence through a good education and convincing them that black skin and afro hair are features of beauty.

== Biography ==
Born in Senegal in c. 1974, Ndella Paye arrived in France in 1993 to join her father, Jacques Diouf, a diplomat. While in Paris, she graduated in Arabic and Muslim Theology, followed by a master's degree in Religious Sciences and Society at the École pratique des hautes études. She married a Frenchman from Senegal whom she met at her mosque. When they separated in 2016, Ndella allowed him to take care of their three daughters, causing considerable criticism. She herself moved to England where she has worked as an accountant.

She has developed her own views on religion, believing that the Quran and other faiths are incorrectly subjected to masculine interpretations. As a result, while strongly supporting Islam, she believes that men and women are equal.

Her feminist activism began in 2004 with preparations for a law prohibiting young women to wear the hijab in French schools. She created the Collectif des Féministes Pour l’Égalité (Feminist Collective for Equal Rights) but left it in 2012 after creating Mamans Toutes Égales (All Mothers Equal) in support of mothers unable to continue their education.

Inspired by Thomas Sankara and Angela Davis, her role model remains her mother, a nurse and a unionist, who fought for the pill despite her husband's objections.
