= Orlanda Maria Duarte Santos Ferreira =

Cape Verdean politician

Orlanda Maria Duarte Santos Ferreira is a former member of the Pan-African Parliament from Cape Verde. She is a former member of the ECOWAS Parliament.
