= Committee on Transport, Industry, Communication, Energy, Science, and Technology =

Committee of the Pan-African Parliament

The Committee on Transport, Industry, Communications, Energy, Science and Technology is one of the ten permanent committees of the Pan-African Parliament.

It is responsible for the following areas:

- Consider issues relating to the development of transport and communications.
- Assist Parliament to oversee the development and implementation of policies of the Union relating to transport, communication, science and technology and industry
- Consider issues relating to the use of science and technology for the development of the Continent
- Assist Parliament to supervise the development policies and the Union implementation programmes for matters of industry, science, technology and energy.

Chairperson of the Committee is Hon Mostefa Boudina of Algeria.

Deputy Chairperson of the Committee is Hon Henriette Massounga Nono from Gabon.

Rapporteur of the Committee is the Hon Suzanne Vos from South Africa.

== See also ==
- Permanent Committees of the Pan-African Parliament
