= Loumonvi Fombo =

Togolese politician (born 1951)

Loumonvi Sodzadan Fombo (born January 3, 1951) is a member of the Pan-African Parliament from Togo.

Fombo was born in Atakpamé and is a member of the Ifê ethnic group. In 1996 he became Regional Director of Agriculture, Breeding, and Fishing in Plateaux Region, and he was subsequently elected to the National Assembly of Togo. He was First Vice-President of the National Assembly from 2000 to 2002, and he was re-elected to the National Assembly in the October 2002 parliamentary election from the First Constituency of Ogou Prefecture. Standing as the candidate of the ruling Rally of the Togolese People (RPT), he was the only candidate in his constituency due to an opposition boycott, but it was nevertheless alleged that young people were driven around to different polling stations to vote for him multiple times. Following this election, he became President of the National Assembly's Human Rights Commission. In 2004, he was elected to the Pan-African Parliament.
