= Committee on Cooperation, International Relations, and Conflict Resolution =

Committee of the Pan-African Parliament

The Committee on Cooperation, International Relations, and Conflict Resolution is one of the ten permanent committees of the Pan-African Parliament.

It is charged with the following duties:

- Consider issues relating to the development of an efficient policy in matters of cooperation and international relations of the Parliament and the Union.
- Consider the conventions and protocols linking the Parliament with regional and international institutions and report to the Parliament.
- Carry out examinations on the revision of Protocols and Treaties of the Union.
- Assist the Parliament in its efforts of conflict prevention and resolution.

Chairperson of the Committee is Hon Elhadj Diao Kante from Guinea.

Deputy Chairperson of the Committee Hon Mrs Diye Ba Mauritania.

Rapporteur of the Committee is Hon Symon V Kaunda of Malawi.

== See also ==
- Permanent Committees of the Pan-African Parliament
