= Fidel Marcos Mane Ncogo =

Equatoguinean politician

- Born: Fidel Marcos Mane Ncogo Eyang
- Occupation: Politician

Fidel Marcos Mane Ncogo Eyang is an Equatoguinean politician who served as a member of the Pan-African Parliament representing Equatorial Guinea and as the Minister Delegate of Energy for his home country.
