= Baba Jigida =

Sierra Leonean politician

Princess Baba Jigida is a Sierra Leonean politician. She is a member of the Sierra Leone People's Party (SLPP). She is also a member of the Pan-African Parliament as well as a member of the Parliament of Sierra Leone from the Western Area Rural District outside of Freetown.
