= Jean-Baptiste Nouganga =

Central African politician

Jean-Baptiste Nouganga is a member of the Pan-African Parliament from the Central African Republic.
