= José Manuel Gomes Andrade =

Cape Verdean politician

José Manuel Gomes Andrade was previously a member of the Pan-African Parliament from Cape Verde. As of 2015 he is serving as a member of Cape Verde's national assembly.
