= Ibra Diouf =

Senegalese politician

Ibra Diouf is a Senegalese politician who served as a member of the Pan-African Parliament. Ibra Diouf is also served as the Minister of Regional Planning and Local Government under President Macky Sall from 2013 to 2017. He was born on June 4, 1962, in Kolda, Senegal.

Prior to his appointment as a minister, Diouf held various positions in both the public and private sectors. He worked for the Senegalese government as a technical adviser and served as the Director of Studies and Planning at the Ministry of Local Government.

Diouf was also involved in politics, and in 2012 he was elected as the mayor of the town of Kolda. He was later appointed as the Minister of Regional Planning and Local Government, where he played a key role in the implementation of the government's decentralization policy.

In 2017, Diouf was replaced as Minister of Regional Planning and Local Government by Oumar Guèye. Since then, he has remained active in Senegalese politics and continues to be a prominent figure in the country's political landscape.
