= Maria Angelina Dique Enoque =

Mozambican politician

Maria Angelina Dique Enoque is a Mozambican politician.

== Political career ==
In 2004 she was a member of the Pan-African Parliament and in the Agricultural committee. She was elected to the Assembly of the Republic of Mozambique with RENAMO from Manica Province in the 1999 election.
