= Georgette Sobhi Kaliny =

Egyptian politician

- Occupation: Politician

Georgette Sobhi Kaliny is an Egyptian politician who served as a member of the Pan-African Parliament representing Egypt and as a member of the Parliament of Egypt.
