= Committee on Monetary and Financial Affairs =

Committee of the Pan-African Parliament

The Committee on Monetary and Financial Affairs is one of the ten permanent committees of the Pan-African Parliament.

The committee deals with the following concerns:

- Examine the draft estimates of the Parliamentary budget and submit them to Parliament.
- Discuss the budget of the Union and make appropriate recommendations.
- Examine and report to Parliament on the problems involved in the implementation of the annual budget.
- Assist Parliament in executing its role of establishing sound economic, monetary and investment policies

The chairperson of the Committee is Peter Daka from Zambia.

Deputy Chairperson Babacar Gaye from Senegal.

Rapporteur is Wycliffe Oparanya from Kenya.

== See also ==
- Permanent Committees of the Pan-African Parliament
