= Patrica Ndogu =

Nigerian politician

Patrica N. Ndogu is a member of the Pan-African Parliament from Nigeria.
