= Danboyi Usman =

Nigerian politician

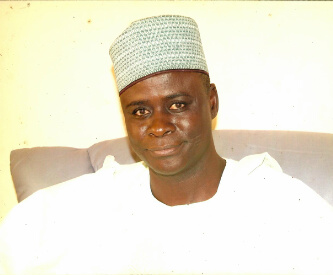
Sen. Saleh Usman Danboyi

Late Saleh Usman Danboyi was a Muslim member of the Pan-African Parliament (PAP), the legislative body of the African Union, and a senator from Taraba State, northern Nigeria. His membership in the People's Democratic Party was purportedly revoked in 2005 by the then state administration, but this action was declared illegal by the National Excos of the party after severe criticism of same by other politicians. Late Saleh Usman Danboyi was also a former deputy governor of taraba state under joly nyame’s first tenure as the governor of taraba state. He died as the Director General of PDP gubernatorial campaign council in 2015 election of the present governor Darius Dickson Ishiaku

== See also ==
- List of members of the Pan-African Parliament
