= Mohammed el-Hadhiri =

Libyan politician

Mohammed El-hadhiri (Arabic: محمد الحاضري) is a member of the Pan-African Parliament from Libya.

== Notes ==
The name is also transliterated as Mohamed Elmadani El-Houderi
