= Joséphine Drabo Kanyoulou =

Burkinabé politician

- Occupation: Politician
- Organization(s): Alliance for Democracy and Federation – African Democratic Rally, Economic Community of West African States

Joséphine Drabo Kanyoulou is a Burkinabé politician. She has served as a member of the Pan-African Parliament representing Burkina Faso, vice president of the Alliance for Democracy and Federation – African Democratic Rally, a women’s leadership program member for the Africa Liberal Network, a collaborator with Women Political Leaders and the National Democratic Institute, and as the second-vice president of the parliament of the Economic Community of West African States.

She was one of a delegation of women MPs who attended COP21 representing the Women in Parliaments Global Forum and National Democratic Institute.
