= Committee on Gender, Family, Youth, and People with Disabilities =

Committee of the Pan-African Parliament

The Committee on Gender, Family, Youths and People with Disabilities is one of the ten permanent committees of the Pan-African Parliament. It concentrates on issues concerning women, family and people and children with disabilities.

Functions of the Committee:

- Consider issues relating to the promotion of gender equality.
- Assist Parliament to oversee the development of policies and activities of the Union relating to family, youth and people with disabilities.

The chairperson is Hon. Dao Gabala Mariam.

The African Union also has a Women, Gender, Development and Youth Directorate (WGDY).

== See also ==
- Permanent Committees of the Pan-African Parliament
