= Christian Sendegeya =

Burundian politician

Christian Sendegeya is a Burundian politician. He is a member of the Pan-African Parliament from Burundi. He has also been the governor of Muramvya Province. He returned to Burundi in 2001 after seven years of exile in Denmark.

A Tutsi, he was a member of the pro-Hutu party CNDD and even served as their vice-president.
