= Améyo Adja =

Togolese politician

Member of the Pan-African Parliament
- Incumbent
- Assumed office 2004

Member of the ECOWAS Parliament
- Incumbent
- Assumed office 2 November 2005

Member of the National Assembly of Togo
- Incumbent
- Assumed office October 2002
- Constituency: Second Constituency of Lomé

Personal details
- Born: July 1956 (age 70) Lomé, Togo
- Party: Rally for the Strengthening of Democracy and Development

Améyo Adja (born July 1956) is a Togolese politician and a member of the Pan-African Parliament from Togo.

== Biography ==
Adja was born in Lomé.

She was elected to the National Assembly of Togo in the October 2002 parliamentary election as a candidate of the Rally for the Strengthening of Democracy and Development (RSDD) from the Second Constituency of Lomé, and she became President of the Opposition Parliamentary Group. She was elected to the ECOWAS Parliament by the National Assembly on November 2, 2005, receiving 59 votes from the 68 deputies present.

She was also elected to the Pan-African Parliament, becoming one of Togo's five members when it began meeting in March 2004.
