= Ronald Koone Sebego =

Motswana politician

Ronald Koone Sebego is a member of the Pan-African Parliament from Botswana and the National Assembly of Botswana. He is also a member of the Botswana Democratic Party.
