= Pierre Claver Nahimana =

Burundian politician

Pierre Claver Nahimana is a member of the Pan-African Parliament from Burundi.
