= Joseph Mbah Ndam =

Cameroonian politician

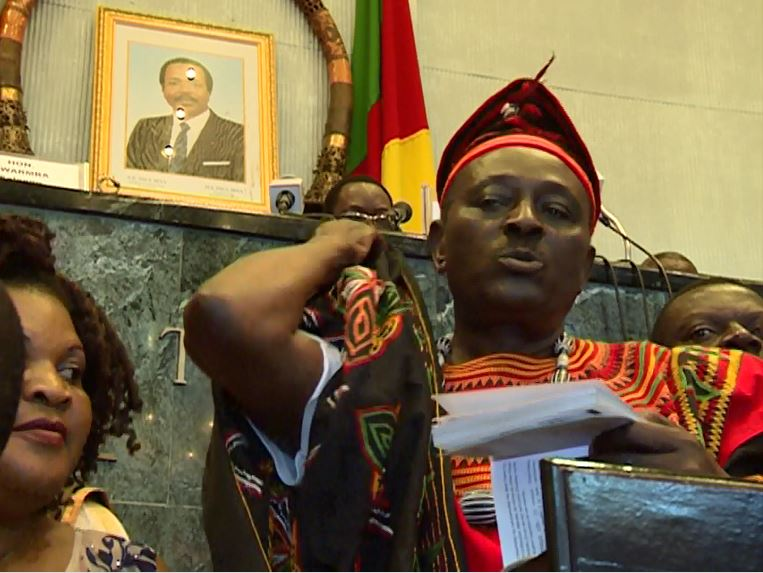

Personal details
- Political party: Social Democratic Front

Joseph Njang Mbah Ndam was a Cameroonian politician. He was a member of the opposition Social Democratic Front and served as its party chairman. He was also a member of the Pan-African Parliament.

== See also ==
- List of members of the Pan-African Parliament

He died on April 13, 2020, in Yaounde Cameroons Capital following an illness.
