= Kara Baya =

Algerian politician

Kara Baya is a member of the Pan-African Parliament from Algeria, beginning in 2004.

== See also ==
- List of members of the Pan-African Parliament
