= Elie Victor Essomba Tsoungui =

Cameroonian politician

Elie Victor Essomba Tsoungui is a member of the Pan-African Parliament from Cameroon.

== See also ==
- List of members of the Pan-African Parliament
