= Jean-Benoît Gonda =

Central African politician

- Occupation: Politician

Jean-Benoît Gonda is a Central African politician. He served in the Pan-African Parliament representing Central African Republic and in the National Assembly as a part of the National Party for a New Central Africa.
