= Committee on Health, Labour, and Social Affairs =

Committee of the Pan-African Parliament

The Committee on Health, Labour, and Social Affairs is one of the ten permanent committees of the Pan-African Parliament.

It takes the following actions:

- Consider strategies and programmes for the improvement of the lives of African peoples.
- Consider issues relating to regional and international cooperation in strategic planning and implementation of social development and health policies and programs.

Chairperson of the Committee is Hon Dr Khauhelo Deborah Raditapole from Lesotho.

Deputy Chairperson of the Committee Hon Dr Aribot Belly from Guinea.

Rapporteur of the Committee is Hon Ahmed Mohamed Hassan from Djibouti.

Other members of the Committee include: Hon Mbonda Elie from Cameroon among others.

== See also ==
- Permanent Committees of the Pan-African Parliament
