= Committee on Trade, Customs, and Immigration Matters =

Committee of the Pan-African Parliament

The Committee on Trade, Customs, and Immigration Matters, is one of the ten permanent committees of the Pan-African Parliament.

It concentrates on the following:

- Consider matters relating to development of sound policy for cross-border, regional and continental concerns within the areas of trade, customs and immigration.
- Assist the Parliament to oversee relevant organs or institutions and policies of the Union.
- Assist the Parliament to oversee external trade.

The committee is chaired by Lee Maeba of Nigeria.

The deputy chairperson of the committee is Dr. Faeka AlReafi from Egypt.

The rapporteur of the committee is Tsudao Gurirab from Namibia.

The primary objective of the committee is to deal specifically with matters relating to the development of policy for cross-border, regional and continental concerns within the areas of trade (primarily external trade), customs and immigration. It assists the Parliament to oversee relevant organs or institutions and AU policies relating to trade.

== See also ==
- Permanent Committees of the Pan-African Parliament
