= Mário José Carvalho de Lima =

Mário José Carvalho de Lima is a member of the Pan-African Parliament from Cape Verde.

== Education ==
Educated at University of Aveiro, he has served as a lecturer at The Higher Institute of Education of Cape Verde since 1992, and previously taught at University of Aveiro in the 1990s and was the Head of the Department of Science and Technology from 1994 to 1998.
