= Letuka Nkole =

Mosotho politician

Letuka Nkole is a member of the Pan-African Parliament from Lesotho.
