= Ptomsoouwé Batchassi =

Togolese politician (born 1958)

Ptomsoouwé Batchassi (born 1958) is a Togolese politician and a member of the Pan-African Parliament from Togo.

Batchassi was born in Kazaboua, Sotouboua Prefecture. He was administrative secretary of the regional bureau of the Rally of the Togolese People (RPT) in Sotouboua Prefecture from 1992 to 1994. He was subsequently prefectoral secretary of the RPT in Sotouboua Prefecture from 1997 to 2001 and was elected to the National Assembly of Togo in the March 1999 parliamentary election, becoming a member of the National Assembly's Social and Cultural Committee. He was re-elected in the October 2002 parliamentary election from the Second Constituency of Sotouboua Prefecture and became Second Questeur of the National Assembly.

On February 3, 2004 he was elected to the Pan-African Parliament; he was re-elected to the Pan-African Parliament in 2005.

Batchassi is a member of the RPT Central Committee from Sotouboua Prefecture as of the RPT's Ninth Ordinary Congress in December 2006.
