= Committee on Rules, Privileges, and Discipline =

Committee of the Pan-African Parliament

The Committee on Rules, Privileges and Discipline is one of the ten permanent committees of the Pan-African Parliament.

== Functions ==
The committee's functions are to:

- Assist the Bureau in interpretation and application of these Rules of Procedure.
- Consider requests for waiver of immunity and discipline submitted under these rules.
- Consider proposals for the amendment of the Rules of Procedure; and consider cases of indiscipline referred to.

== Leadership ==
Chairperson of the committee is Hon Miria Matembe (Uganda).

The deputy chairperson is the Hon Ismaël Tidjani Serpos (Benin).

The rapporteur of the committee is the Hon Abraham Ossei Aidooh (Ghana).

== See also ==
- Permanent Committees of the Pan-African Parliament
