= Steven Malamba =

Malawian politician

Steven Smart Jampa Malamba is a member of the Pan-African Parliament from Malawi.
