= Committee on Education, Culture, Tourism, and Human Resources =

Committee of the Pan-African Parliament

The Committee on Education, Culture, Tourism and Human Resources is one of the ten permanent committees of the Pan-African Parliament. It deals with issues relating to education, cultural issues, tourism and human resources.

Functions of the committee:

- Consider strategies and programmes for the improvement of the lives of African peoples.
- Consider issues relating to regional and international cooperation in strategic planning and implementation of social development and health policies and programs.

Chairperson of the Committee is Hon William F. Shija from (Tanzania).

Deputy Chairperson of the Committee is the Hon Maidagi Allambeye from (Niger).

Rapporteur of the Committee is the Hon Draoui Mohamed (Algeria).

== See also ==
- Cultural resources management
- Permanent Committees of the Pan-African Parliament
