= Marie Blandine Sawadogo =

Burkinabé politician

Marie Blandine Ouédraogo Sawadogo is a member of the Pan-African Parliament from Burkina Faso.Sawadogo is a member of the National Assembly of Burkina Faso representing the Congress for Democracy and Progress party. She was elected to the Pan-African Parliament in 2004. Sawadogo is currently the vice-president of the Congress for Democracy and Progress (CDP), a political party in Burkina Faso. She also serves as the coordinator of the general assembly. She is the mother of Belgian athlete Élodie Ouédraogo.

In May 2022 she acted as coordinator of a general assembly of CDP women activists in Ouagadougou that was framed as both a show of party presence and support for the Mouvement patriotique pour la sauvegarde et la restauration (MPSR) transitional authorities. At that gathering, she publicly argued that all political actors and citizens should support efforts toward peace and security in Burkina Faso.

In May 2022, speaking as the vice-president of the Congress for Democracy and Progress (CDP), Sawadogo publicly urged support for national peace and security efforts under the MPSR.

== See also ==
- List of members of the Pan-African Parliament
