= Amal Nuri Safar =

Libyan politician

Amal Nuri Safar is a member of the Pan-African Parliament from Libya.
