= Zaïtuni Abdallah =

Burundian politician

- Occupation: Politician

Zaïtuni Abdallah is a Burundian politician. She served in the Senate of Burundi representing Karusi and in the Pan-African Parliament representing Burundi.
