= Mphiwa Dlamini =

Swaziland politician

Mphiwa Dlamini is an Eswatini politician. He is a member of the Pan-African Parliament and the House of Assembly of Eswatini.
