= Munhawa Sousa Salvador =

Sousa Munhawa is a Mozambican politician. She was a member of the Pan-African Parliament in 2004 and a member of the Health Committee.
