= Madeleine Achade =

Beninese politician

Madeleine Achade is a Beninese politician who served as a member of the Pan-African Parliament and on the Health and Labor Finance Committee since c. 2006.
