= João Baptista Ferreira Medina =

Cape Verdean politician

João Baptista Ferreira Medina is a politician from Cape Verde. Medina is a member of the Movement for Democracy (MPD) and was elected to the National Assembly from the São Vicente constituency. He is also a member of the Pan-African Parliament.
