= Schadrack Niyonkuru =

Burundian politician

Schadrack Niyonkuru (sometimes spelled Shadrack) is a member of the Pan-African Parliament and the National Assembly of Burundi. He is the former President of the Parti du peuple, a Burundi political party allied with the Front for Democracy in Burundi. Niyonkuru is from Bururi Province.

== Works ==
- "LE ROLE DU PARLEMENT DANS LA GESTION DE L'AIDE PUBLIQUE AU BURUNDI" (PDF, in French). International Cooperation Ethics Advisory Agency. 2008.
