= Gayo Asherbiri =

Ethiopian politician

His Excellency Gayo Asherbiri

Elected member of the National Assembly of Ethiopia

Vice President - Pan African Parliament
- In office 2022–2027

Acting President Pan African Parliament
- Incumbent
- Assumed office August 2022

Personal details
- Born: Gayo Asherbiri Ethiopia

Gayo Asherbiri is an Ethiopian doctor, politician and member of parliament in the Parliament of Ethiopia. He is also the current Acting President of the Pan African Parliament as of August 2023.

== Career ==
Gayo is a medical doctor by profession. He first ran for office as Member of the Ethiopian Parliament in 2004. He then joined the Pan African Parliament and rose through the ranks to become Vice President of the East African Caucus in 2022.

In August 2023, he became acting President of the Pan African Parliament. Days later, he dismissed Zimbabwean preacher Uebert Angel as Pan African Parliament Ambassador in what he said was an illegal appointment.

== Personal life ==
Gayo is married and lives in Addis Ababa.
