= Marie-Thérèse Toyi =

Marie-Thérèse Toy is a Burundian academic, lecturer and researcher. Toyi is the author of the English-language novel Weep Not, Refugee (2014), about the Burundian Civil War.
