= Elise Loum =

Elise Ndoadoumngue Ne'loumsei Loum (born 1956, Chad) was a vice-president of the African Union's Pan-African Parliament from 2004 to 2009. In 1983 she received a Junior High School Teacher Certificate from Advanced Teachers' College, N'Djaména, Chad. She was awarded an English First Certificate in 1986 from Colchester English Study Centre, University of Essex, Colchester, Essex, and was given a certificate in Education from Northern Arizona University in 1990.

== Biography ==
In 1994 she earned a Senior High School Teacher Certificate from Advanced Teachers' College in N'Djaména, Chad. She has a Certificate in Human Resource Management from Yaoundé Catholic University - Louvain University, Belgium & CEFOD, N'Djaména. She is a recipient of an Education Testing Certificate (International Testing and Training Programs) from Princeton, New Jersey. In 1995 she joined the Peace Corps working in Chad.

In 1983 she was a high school English teacher. For one year in 1987 she trained experts at the Dutch Association for Development. From 1995 to 1998 she was principal of Félix Éboué Junior High School in N'Djaména. In 1999 she became Head of Educational Service at the Prime Minister's Office. For one year in 2000 she was a Technical Advisor of the President of Republic. in 2001 she was Minister of Social Affairs, Childhood and Family, which she did until 2002. in June 2002 she became 2nd Deputy Speaker of the National Assembly of Chad. She is now the second vice president of the National Assembly.

She is a member of the following organizations:

- Member of the Chadian Teachers' Union.
- Member for African Women's Network for Peace.
- Member of the Association for the Promotion of Fundamental Liberties in Chad.
- President of the Network of Women's Union for Peace.
- Member of CIVITAS.

== See also ==
- List of members of the Pan-African Parliament
