= Terence Mondon =

- Occupation: Politician
- Title: member of the National Assembly of Seychelles

Terence Mondon is a member of the National Assembly of Seychelles. He is a member of the United Seychelles, and was first elected to the Assembly in 2002.

== See also ==
- Politics of Seychelles
