= List of Paramount Chiefs of Sierra Leone =

Below is a list of the current District Chiefs in Sierra Leone. In the government of Sierra Leone, Paramount Chiefs are nonpartisan Members of Parliament. There are District Chiefs representing every district besides the Freetown Districts.

- Bo District, Southern Region – Paramount Chief Joe Kangbai Macavoray
- Bombali District, Northern Region – Paramount Chief Kandeh Finoh III
- Bonthe District Southern Region -Paramount Chief Rugiatu Inatorma Sasay Bumpeh II, Nongoba Bullom Chiefdom
- Bonthe District, Southern Region – Paramount Chief Alie Badara Sheriff
- Falaba District, Northern Region – Paramount Chief Fasalie Kulako Demba Marrah III
- Kailahun District, Eastern Region – Paramount Chief Cyril Foray Gondor II
- Kambia District, Northern Region – Paramount Chief Bai Farama Tass Bubu Ngbnak IV
- Karene District, Northern Region – Paramount Chief Sheik Abdulrahman Tejan Bangura Kafoir 1
- Kenema District, Eastern Region – Paramount Chief Prince Mambu Pewa III
- Koinadugu District, Northern Region – Paramount Chief Alie Balasama Marah IV
- Kono District, Eastern Region – Paramount Chief Sahr Youngai Kontanday Mbriwa II
- Kowa Chiefdom, Southern Region - Paramount Chief Amy Kallon-Tibbie Il
- Moyamba District, Southern Region – Paramount Chief Haja Fatmata Bintu Koroma Meama-Kajue
- Port Loko District, Northern Region, – Paramount Chief Bai Sherbora Sehba Gbereh
- Pujehun District, Southern Region – Paramount Chief Matilda Yayu Lansana Minah
