= Zawadówka =

Zawadówka may refer to the following places:

- Zawadówka, Gmina Chełm in Lublin Voivodeship (east Poland)
- Zawadówka, Gmina Rejowiec in Lublin Voivodeship (east Poland)
- Zawadówka, Włodawa County in Lublin Voivodeship (east Poland)
