= Idriss Ndélé Moussa =

Chadian politician (1959–2013)

Idriss Ndélé Moussa Yayami (17 April 1959, Faya-Largeau – 20 May 2013, N'Djamena) was a Chadian dental surgeon, academic and politician. He was the president of the African Union's Pan-African Parliament from 2009 to 2012. He became president on 29 May 2009. The other leading contenders for the presidency were Sawadogo Lassane and Mostefa Abdelaziz El-Gendy. Moussa received a majority of votes of the members of the Pan-African Parliament.

== Early life ==
A dental surgeon by profession, Moussa served as assistant professor at the Faculty of Health Sciences at the University of N'Djamena. He was married and had six children.

Moussa held several leadership positions within the National Assembly of Chad, and served for several years in the Pan-African Parliament.

He also served as Secretary General of the Conseil Supérieur de Transition (CST), which acted as a provisional parliament from the National Sovereign Conference in Chad. He was a member of the African Union mission to observe the parliamentary elections in Mauritius in 2005, member of the PAP mission to observe the general elections in Zimbabwe in 2008, and Head of the PAP mission to observe the parliamentary elections in Angola in 2008.

He died on 20 May 2013 in a car accident in N'Djamena.

== See also ==
- List of members of the Pan-African Parliament

Political offices
Preceded by Gertrude Mongella	President of the Pan-African Parliament; 2009 – 2012	Succeeded by Bethel Nnaemeka Amadi
