= Mohamed Salah Zaray =

Tunisian politician

Mohamed Salah Zaray is a member of the African Union's Pan-African Parliament representing Tunisia.
