= Mohammad Salah =

Mohammad Salah محمدصلاح
- Village
- Location within Iran
- Coordinates: 39°04′15″N 44°38′55″E
- Country: Iran
- Province: West Azerbaijan
- County: Chaldoran
- Bakhsh: Central
- Rural District: Baba Jik

Population (2006)
  - Total: 57
- Time zone: UTC+3:30 (IRST)
  - Summer (DST): UTC+4:30 (IRDT)

Mohammad Salah (Persian: محمدصلاح, also Romanized as Moḩammad Şalāḩ and Moḩammad Şāleḩ) is a village in Baba Jik Rural District, in the Central District of Chaldoran County, West Azerbaijan Province, Iran. At the 2006 census, its population was 57 in 9 families.
