= Khauhelo Deborah Raditapole =

Mosotho politician

Dr. Khauhelo Deborah Raditapole

Natural Resources

Ministry of Natural Resources
- In office 1995–1996
- Constituency: Mabote constituency

Ministry of Health and Social Welfare
- Incumbent
- Assumed office 1992

Personal details
- Born: 7 August 1938 (age 88)
- Party: Basotho Congress Party

Khauhelo Deborah Raditapole was a member of the Pan-African Parliament from Lesotho. Raditapole was born in Maseru on 7 August 1938. She had her earlier education in Lesotho, but obtained her Pharmacy degree from Lvov Medical School at Ukraine and completed her higher studies in the US. She worked in a teaching hospital in Tanzania for 10 years as she was denied entry to Lesotho. She returned to Lesotho in 1987 at the invitation of the then Principal Secretary for Health Tom Thabane.

She started her political career as a member of the Mabote constituency in 1993 from Basotho Congress Party (BCP). She was deputed the Minister of Health initially and transferred to Ministry of Natural Resources. When she was transferred again in 1996, she resigned her post as a minister, the first of its kind in Lesotho. As a minister, she defined the strategy for AIDS control in 1994 and also credited to have effected Jordan basin project which became Metolong Dam project.

== Early life ==
Raditapole was born in Maseru on 7 August 1938, her father who was a civil servant. While she completed her high school at Basutoland High School in 1959 in Lesotho, she did her higher education in the Soviet Union. She won a scholarship to her bachelor's degree in pharmacy at Lvov Medical School from 1962–67 and completed her Master's in the US. She was denied entry to Lesotho on the claims that she was trained to make bombs. Along with her other colleagues, she was a refugee in Dar es Salaam, Tanzania. She served as an employee of a teaching hospital in Tanzania. She was invited to the country by the then Principal Secretary for Health, Thomas Thabane, who went on to become the prime minister of Lesotho. After returning in 1981, she worked in Lesotho Pharmaceutical Corporation.

== Political career ==
At the end of emergency rule in 1992, Dr. Raditapole was elected into the Basotho Congress Party (BCP) National Executive Committee at the party's first annual congress. She was the candidate of Mabote constituency in 1993 from BCP and retained the seat until 1998. She was appointed the Minister of Health under the rule of Mokhehle. She was transferred from the Ministry of Health to Ministry of Natural Resources in 1995. She was serving as the Ministry of Natural Resources in 1996 when her ministry position was shuffled. She was not satisfied and resigned the post as a minister, which was uncommon in Lesotho. After resignation, she was tipped to become the next and first female prime minister of Lesotho, but her party failed to win majority votes in the following elections. During 2003, she had clashed within the party with the party leader Qhobela winning the case against her in High Court that the party conference she held was not improper. But she went on to become the leader of the party in the annual conference on 28 February 2004.

== Accolades ==
Raditapole, as the Minister of Health, defined the strategy for AIDS control in 1994, the epidemic that threatened to wipe out many citizens of the country. She was also credited to have effected Jordan basin project which became Metolong Dam project. The project ensured access to clean water to Basotho. She served as a member of the Pan-African Parliament from Lesotho in 2004.
