= Permanent Committees of the Pan-African Parliament =

Committees of the parliament of the African Union

To help coordinate efforts in dealing with issues on the continent the Pan-African Parliament created eleven permanent committees:

1. Committee on Rural Economy, Agriculture, Natural Resources, and Environment
2. Committee on Monetary and Financial Affairs
3. Committee on Trade, Customs, and Immigration Matters
4. Committee on Cooperation, International Relations, and Conflict Resolution
5. Committee on Transport, Industry, Communication, Energy, Science, and Technology
6. Committee on Health, Labour and Social Affairs
7. Committee on Gender, Family, Youth, and People with Disabilities
8. Committee on Education, Culture, Tourism, and Human Resources
9. Committee on Justice and Human Rights
10. Committee on Rules, Privileges, and Discipline
11. Committee on Audit and Public Accounts

== See also ==
- Pan-African Parliament
- Community of Sahel–Saharan States
