= Sam Otada =

Ugandan politician

- Born: 27 October 1976 (age 49); Masindi, Uganda
- Citizenship: Uganda
- Education: Makerere University
- Occupations: Businessman, Lawyer & Retired politician
- Years active: 1999 – present
- Known for: Business acumen
- Title: Chairman; Otada Group of Companies

Samuel Owor Amooti Otada (born 27 October 1976), commonly known as Sam Otada, is a Ugandan businessman, lawyer and retired politician. He is the chairman and group chief executive officer of Otada Group of Companies, a family-owned business conglomerate comprising Otada construction, Otada Foundation, Otada Holdings and Otada Transport. He has been reported to be one of the wealthiest people in Uganda.

Otada previously served as member of Parliament for Kibanda County, Kiryandongo District from 2001 to 2016.

== Education ==
Otada was born in Masindi District, Western Region, on 27 October 1976. He attended Makerere University, Uganda's oldest and largest public university, graduating in 1999, with a Bachelor of Commerce degree. He returned to Makerere in 2014 to pursue a Bachelor of Laws graduating with Honours in January 2019. He completed the legal bar course at Law Development Centre in 2020.

== Business career ==
Otada's father, a businessman and entrepreneur, died in 1999 soon after his youngest son finished his undergraduate studies at Makerere. The young man, at age 22 inherited his father's company, then a bus operator with about 30 buses. Under his leadership, the bus company has grown into four different businesses dealing in transportation, civil engineering, construction, waste management, and mobile telephone airtime.

Otada was elected as the member of Parliament for Kibanda County, Kiryandongo District in 2001. He held the seat in 2006 and 2011. For the 2016 general election, the constituency was split into two, with Otada standing for the new constituency of Kibanda County North on an independent ticket. He lost to Taban Idi Amin, but challenged the result through the courts.

== Political career ==
During the ninth Parliament (2011–16), Otada served as the Leader of the Independents in the Ugandan parliament. He sat on the following parliamentary committees:

- Equal Opportunities Committee
- Legal and Parliamentary Affairs Committee

== See also ==
- Kiryandongo
