= Yamba Sawadogo =

Burkinabé politician and former prisoner

- Born: Yamba Malick Sawadogo
- Occupations: Politician, former prisoner

Yamba Malick Sawadogo is a Burkinabé politician and former prisoner. Sawadogo represented Burkina Faso in the Pan-African Parliament and, in 1987, while serving jail time at the Ouagadougou Arrest and Correction House, was involved in the burial of assassinated president Thomas Sankara.
