= Mohammed Lutfi Farhat =

Mohammed Lutfi Farhat (born 1945) is a member of the Pan-African Parliament from Libya and the Parliament's North African Vice President.

== Education ==
In 1968 Farhat received a Bachelor of Economics from Libyan University. A master's degree in economics from the University of Southampton, United Kingdom, in 1972, and a PhD in economics from Southampton in 1976. He has been a lecturer at the Garyonis University since 1976, and from 1977 to 1979 was secretary to Fund for University Pedagogical Staff Syndicate. In 1978 he was an assistant professor at the Al-Fateh and Garyonis Universities.

For five years, starting in 1985, Farhat was secretary to Research and Studies Branch in the International Centre of Green Book Studies and Research, while also being an associate professor at the Al-Fateh University in 1982. He was a lecturer at the Green Coliseum in 1980. In 1984 Farhat was a member of a committee assigned to prepare the Concept of Application of the Citation (partners not wage takers) and a member of a committee assigned to review commercial law. In 1986 he was a professor at the Al-Fateh University, a lecturer at the Credence Institute, and chief of the Industrial and Economical Survey Team. From 1986 to 1987 was secretary to the Advisory Council of Imports. He also was secretary to the General People's Committee for Planning from 1987 to 1990.

In 1990 was Farhat Chief of the Economic Committee for Africa, manager of the Green Credence Institute from 1991 to 1995, in 1993 was a member of the advisory committee for Al-Shams Newspaper. Has been a board member at the Central Bank of Libya from 1994 to 2001, was chairman of the Libya Insurance Company from 1995 to 2001, board director and vice-chairman at the Arab Reinsurance Company from 1995 to 2001, executive committee member at Arab War Risks Syndicate from 1996 to 2001, in 1997 was a member of a committee assigned to prepare the Concept of the Planning Board, from member of the general planning board from 1998 to 2004, and rector of Al-Fateh University in 2001 to 2004.

== Awards and honors ==
1989 – Great Al-Fatah Medallion

== Books and treatises ==
- Some Aspects of Justice in Distribution, General Establishment for Publishing, Distribution and Advertisement (1984)
- Optimal Use of Non-Renewable Resources, Al-Fateh University (1984)
- Outlines of a New Economic Theory, International Centre for Green Book Research and Studies (1984)
- The System of Participation in Production, International Centre for Green Book Research and Studies (1984)
- Principles of Econometrics, Jamahiriyan House for Publishing, Distribution and Advertisement (1986)
- A Study of Economies of Natural Resources in Great Jamahiriya, (a thesis prepared with others for the Industrial Research Centre) (1986)
- The Great Achievement, International Centre for Green Book Research and Studies (1987)
- Socialism, a study of the Economic System, Jamahiriyan House for Publishing, Distribution and Advertisement (1989)
- The Unjust Rules, Jamahiriyan House for Publishing, Distribution and Advertisement (1995)
- The Wealth of the Nation, Jamahiriyan House for Publishing, Distribution and Advertisement (1996)
- The Natural Rights for the Human Being, International Centre for Green Book Research and Studies (1998)
- The Socialist Economy, Theory and Application, Information and Educational Department (2001)
- The Tariff Wars (manuscript)
- A study on the National Accounts (manuscript)
