= Bethel Nnaemeka Amadi =

Nigerian politician (1964–2019)

Bethel Nnaemeka Amadi // (25 April 1964 – 10 February 2019) was a Nigerian politician. He served as President of the Pan-African Parliament between 2012 and 2015.

== Career ==
Amadi was born on 25 April 1964 to parents from Imo State. He went to the University of Jos where he obtained a bachelor's degree in Law with Honors. He was called to the bar in 1986. In the early 1990s Amadi worked in the oil business in Nigeria and together with others he founded a law firm. In the 2003 Nigerian parliamentary election Amadi was elected to the House of Representatives for Imo state's Mbaitoli/ Ikeduru federal constituency representing the Peoples Democratic Party. He was re-elected in the 2007 general election and the 2011 general election. In this period he served a time as chief whip during the tenure of speaker Patricia Etteh.

Between 2012 and 2015 he served as President of the Pan-African Parliament. On 27 May 2015 his successor Roger Nkodo Dang was elected. Amadi died on 10 February 2019.

Political offices
Preceded by Idriss Ndele Moussa	President of the Pan-African Parliament; 2012–2015	Succeeded by Roger Nkodo Dang
