= Mahamane Saley =

Nigerien politician

Mahamane Saley is a Nigerien politician. He has been a member of the Pan-African Parliament for Niger since first being appointed in 1999.
