= Bayah, Afghanistan =

Bayah
- Location in Afghanistan
- Coordinates: 35°24′41″N 64°05′22″E
- Country: Afghanistan
- Province: Badghis Province
- Time zone: + 4.30

Bayah (also, Bāyah and Bāya) is a town in Badghis Province, Afghanistan.
