= Baya, Sar-e Pol =

Village in Afghanistan

Coordinates: 35°47′28″N 66°45′26″E

Baya is a village in Sar-e Pol Province, Afghanistan.

== See also ==
- Sar-e Pol Province
