= Roger Nkodo Dang =

Cameroonian politician

His Excellency Roger Nkodo Dang MP

President of the Pan-African Parliament
- In office May 27, 2015 – March 1, 2021
- Preceded by: Bethel Nnaemeka Amadi

Personal details
- Born: 6 November 1963 (age 62) Fang-Bikang I, Cameroon
- Party: RDPC

Roger Nkodo Dang (born 6 November 1963) is a Cameroonian politician. He became President of the Pan-African Parliament in 2015. On 27 May 2015, he obtained 85 votes to be elected as the successor to former president Bethel Nnaemeka Amadi. Dang is a member of the National Assembly of Cameroon.

== Career ==
Dang is a diplomat by training. Under Amadi's presidency from 2012 to 2015, he served as the first vice-president of the Pan-African Parliament, representing the Central Africa Region.

During the 2013 Cameroon People's Democratic Movement (CPDM) nomination process for the Cameroonian legislature, the list that Nkodo Dang led was initially disqualified in favor of that of Jean-Claude Bekolo Mbang. However, the work of Nkodo Dang in the Pan-African Parliament allow him to consider becoming president. The CPDM, under pressure from Cavaye Yeguié Djibril, President of the Assembly, decided to disqualify Bekolo Mbang's list and requalify that of Nkodo Dang. In the election Nkodo Dang returned to his seat at the National Assembly.

Nkodo Dang is a member of the Yebekolo ethnic group, a sub-group of the Boulou people.
