= Committee on Rural Economy, Agriculture, Natural Resources, and Environment =

Committee of the Pan-African Parliament

The Committee on Rural Economy Agriculture, Natural Resources and Environment is one of the ten Permanent Committees of the Pan-African Parliament.

Functions of the committee:

- Consider the development of common regional and continental policies in the agricultural sector.
- Assist the Parliament to oversee and assist with the harmonisation of policies for rural and agricultural development and promote the development policy and the implementation of programmes of the Union relating of natural resources and environment.

The Chairperson of the Committee is Malik Hussein from Sudan.

Louis Chimango from Malawi is Deputy Chairperson.

Diop Hamdi Kalidou from Mauritania is Rapporteur.

== See also ==
- Permanent Committees of the Pan-African Parliament
