= Gertrude Mongella =

Tanzanian politician

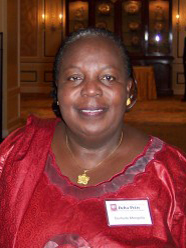

Member of the Tanzanian Parliament
- In office 2000 – 2010; Prior term: 1980-1993
- Succeeded by: Machemli Naluyaga
- Constituency: Ukerewe

1st President of the Pan-African Parliament
- In office May 2004 – May 2009
- Succeeded by: Idriss Ndele Moussa
- Constituency: Tanzania

Tanzanian High Commissioner to India
- In office 1991–1992
- President: Ali Hassan Mwinyi

Minister without Portfolio
- In office 1987–1990
- President: Ali Hassan Mwinyi

Minister of Lands, Tourism and Natural Resources
- In office 1985–1987
- President: Ali Hassan Mwinyi

Personal details
- Born: Gertrude Ibengwe Makanza; 13 September 1945 (age 81) Ukerewe Island, Tanganyika
- Party: CCM
- Spouse: Silvin Mongella
- Children: 3: John; Patrick; Emmanuel
- Education: UDSM (BA)

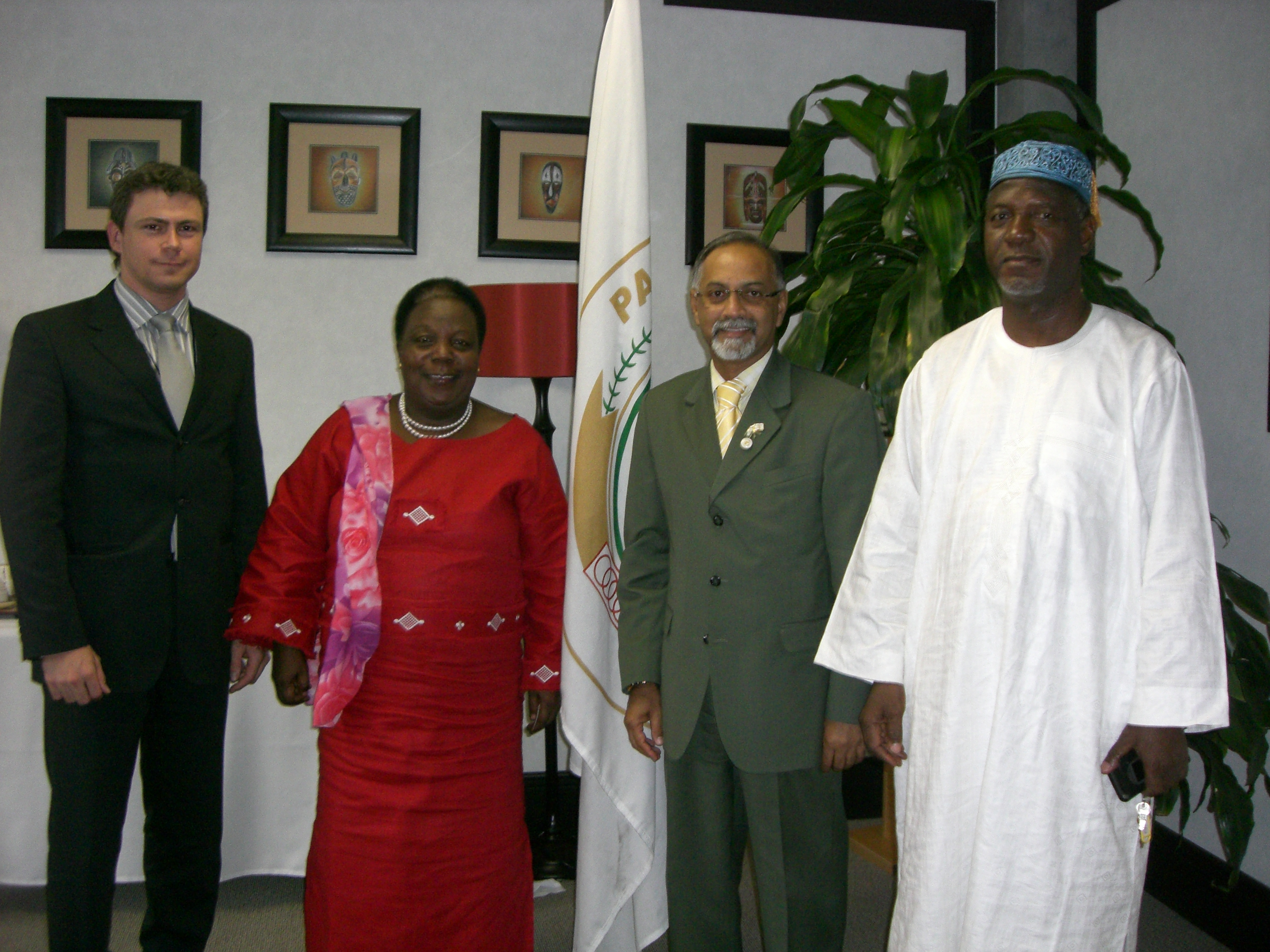
Mongella with Malik Yakubu (r)

Gertrude Ibengwe Mongella (née Makanza; born 13 September 1945) is a Tanzanian politician who was the first president of the Pan-African Parliament.

== Early life and work ==
Mongella was born in 1945 on Ukerewe Island, now in Ukerewe District, Mwanza Region. In 1970, Mongella graduated from the University of East Africa, in Dar es Salaam.

For four years, Mongella was a tutor at Dar es Salaam Teachers Training College. In 1974, she became curriculum developer for the Dar es Salaam Institutes of Education, a post that she had until 1978. From 1977 to 1992, she was a Member of the Central Committee and National Executive Committee of the CCM. From 1975 to 1982, she was a member of the Council of the University of Dar es Salaam. During the same period, she was on the board of directors for the Tanzania Rural Development Bank.

== Governmental work ==
In the mid-1970s, Mongella was a Member of the East African Legislative Assembly. Throughout the 1980s and for some of the 1990s, she was a member of the Parliament of Tanzania. From 1982 to 1988, Mongella was Minister of State in the Prime Minister's office. Then, she became Minister of Lands, Tourism and Natural Resources from 1985 to 1987. Finally, from 1987 to 1990, she was a Minister Without Portfolio in the President's Office.

== International work ==
In 1985, Mongella became vice-chairperson to the World Conference to Review and Appraise the Achievements of the United Nations Decade for Women. In 1989, Mongella was Tanzanian Representative to the Commission on the Status of Women. From 1990 to 1993, she was a Trustee Member of the United Nations International Research and Training Institute for the Advancement of Women (INSTRAW).

From 1991 to 1992 President Mongella was Tanzanian High Commissioner to India, in 1995 she was UN Assistant Secretary General and Secretary General, Fourth World Conference on Women on Women in Beijing, China. From 1996 to 1997, Mongella was UN Under-Secretary and Special Envoy to the Secretary General of the United Nations on Women's Issues and Development.

In 1996 she was a Member of the Advisory Group to the Director General UNESCO for the follow-up of the Beijing Conference in Africa, South of the Sahara. Also in 1996, she was a board member of the Agency for Co-Operation and Research in Development in London. In 1996 she was a member of the board for both The Hunger Project in New York City, and the UN University in Tokyo, Japan. Also in 1996, she was President of Advocacy for Women in Africa. In 1997 Mongella was Senior Advisor to the Executive Secretary of the Economic Commission for Africa on Gender Issues.

In 1998 she became a member of the OAU sitting on the Women Committee for Peace and Development, In 1999, she was a member of the "Council of the Future", UNESCO, Paris, France. In 2000, she was a Member of the Tanzanian Parliament Ukerewe Constituency. In 2002, she was a member of the OAU's High Level Advisory Panel of Eminent Persons. In 2002 Mongella was a member of the Regional Reproduction Health Task Force for the World Health Organization's African Region, she was also leader of the OAU Election Observer Team to the Zimbabwean Presidential Election. 2003 saw her as Goodwill Ambassador for the World Health Organization's Africa Region. She became a Member and President of the Pan African Parliament in 2004. In 2005, the University of Georgia awarded her the Delta Prize for Global Understanding. She was designated Chairperson of the International Advisory Board of the African Press Organization (APO) in February 2008.

Mongella is a member of the World Future Council.

== Non-Governmental Organization participation ==
President Mongella is a member of the following NGOs:

- African Press Organization. (APO)
- Tanzania Association of Women Leaders in Agriculture and Environment. (TAWALE)
- Society for Women and Aids in Africa Tanzania Branch. (SWAAT)
- Tanzania Dental Association. (TDA)
- Meaendeleo ya Wanawake Ukerewe. (MAWAU)
- World Future Council

== Awards and honours ==
=== Honorary Degrees ===
- Ewha Womans University, Honorary degree, June 2005

Political offices
Preceded by none - new post created	President of the Pan-African Parliament; 2004 – 2008	Succeeded by Idriss Ndele Moussa
