= Mahamane Kalil Maiga =

Malian scientist and politician (born 1948)

Mahamane Kalil Maiga (born 26 May 1948) is a Malian scientist and politician. He served as minister of defense and armed forces of Mali from 2002 to 2004, under the administration of President Amadou Toumani Touré.

== Biography ==
=== Early life and education ===
Mahamane Kalil Maiga was born and raised in Timbuktu, the City of the 333 Saints. He is the son of Kalil Maiga, a chief city district and Arkia Baba Ascofaré, a notable trader in Timbuktu. He attended primary school at the Regional School of Timbuktu from 1954 to 1960 before transferring to the Modern College of Gao where for middle school from 1960 to 1964. Then he completed his secondary education at Askia Mohamed High School in Bamako from 1964 to 1967 where he graduated top of his class with a diploma in biology, before leaving for Europe and then North America to pursue higher education. Upon finishing high school, he won a national scholarship to attend university in Poland where he obtained both his Doctor of Medicine degree in 1974 and Doctor of Science (D.Sc.) degree in Nephrology in 1978 from the Academy of Medicine in Wrocław. He furthered his education by attending the Free University of Berlin and became Facharzt (specialist) in internal medicine in 1981 at Klinikum Stieglitz. In 1984, he was conferred the title of Professor of Medicine of Nephrology after obtaining his aggregation (PhD equivalent) in Paris, France. Later in 1988, after attending Boston University in Massachusetts, USA, he obtained a Master of Public Health (MPH), a certificate in financial management of health services in developing countries, a certificate of healthcare system strategies in developing countries and a certificate of management of maternal and child health. His international exposure makes him a fluent speaker of 7 languages including Arabic, Bambara, English, French, German, Polish and Songhai.

=== Medical career and teaching activities ===
Mahamane Kalil Maiga started his medical career as a Medical intern in nephrology for the Department of Nephrology of the Academy of Medicine in Wrocław, Poland from 1975 to 1977. During these years he also taught nephrology and hypertension courses and conducted research activities on prostaglandin hormones at the academy. When he moved to Germany, he was appointed as the Deputy Head of Clinic in internal medicine and nephrology of Klinikum Stieglitz at the Free University of Berlin from 1978 to 1981. Simultaneously, he continued to teach courses of nephrology, kidney transplant and hypertension and conducting research activities on prostaglandins hormones at the Free University of Berlin. Since returning to Mali in 1981 until the present, he founded the Nephrology and Haemodialysis Department of the National University Hospital of Point G in Bamako, Mali. From 1981 to date he has the Head of the Department at the hospital as well as a Professor of nephrology and internal medicine at the Faculty of Medicine and Pharmacy of the University of Bamako in Mali while conducting a research program on kidney disorders risk factors. During his years in Boston, Massachusetts, USA, he has been working as Associate Professor of public health dealing with HIV/AIDS management in Sub-Saharan Africa for the School of Public Health of Boston University. Early in his career Mahamane Kalil Maiga engaged in a campaign to reform the public healthcare system in Mali. He participated in the set-up of community health centers and the evaluation of the Primary Health Care (PHC) teams at district levels in Mali. Later he joined international organizations to further contribute to this effort and engage the global community to aid Mali. From 1991 to 1996, he worked for the United Nations Development Programme (UNDP) and the World Health Organization (WHO) leading the Mali country teams. He also played a key role working for WHO during the Rwanda genocide. From 1994 to 1995, he was the Team leader of the WHO team in Goma-North Kivu, in the Democratic Republic of Congo (DRC), dealing with emergency humanitarian aid and epidemiology surveillance in the Rwanda refugees' camps. He then became the Head of the WHO Rwanda office and Senior WHO Epidemiologist in charge of the project for the rehabilitation of the national system of epidemiological surveillance in Rwanda. He was also responsible for the preparation of a health sector contingency plan for the return and reintegration of Rwanda refugees.

=== Kidney transplantation campaign ===
Mahamane Kalil Maiga founded the Nephrology and Haemodialysis Department of the national university Hospital Point G in 1981. To date his department is the only health center in Mali where patients suffering with kidney problems can be treated under dialysis. Mahamane Kalil Maiga has become the father of the science of Nephrology in Mali. He has taught and trained many students of the University of Bamako to become doctors in nephrology and specialists in dialysis. In April 2002, he founded the Transplantation Society of Mali, which is a commission of 46 members from the medical profession who tackled and addressed issues related to kidney transplantation and its implications in Mali. On 19 November 2008 the Government and Congress of Mali passed the legislation proposed by the Transplantation Society of Mali, allowing organs transplantation in Mali. Shortly after, working with partners such as the WHO, the International Society of Nephrology, The Transplantation Society, the Global Alliance for Transplantation, the African Association of Nephrology he turned the attention and interest of international health professionals globally to the case of transplantation in Mali and Africa. For the first time in the history of Africa, the very first international conference on organ transplantation in Africa was organized in Bamako, Mali from 4 to 6 December 2008 thanks to dedicated health professionals and scientists such as Mahamane Kalil Maiga who strive to improve health technologies and healthcare systems in Africa.

=== Political activism ===
Mahamane Kalil Maiga is a founding member of the Malian umbrella movement and political party ADEMA – Alliance pour la Démocratie au Mali (Alliance for Democracy in Mali), which was created in 1990 and united several political alliances, following the dictatorship of Former President Moussa Traoré. He is also a founding member and leader of Movement Citoyen (Civic Movement), a political action organization, created in the early 2000s to advocate for the civic rights of the people. Mouvement Citoyen has supported the candidacy of Amadou Toumani Touré during the 2002 presidential elections. From 2002 to 2004, Mahamane Kalil Maiga served as Minister of Defense and Armed Forces in Mali.
