= Fortune Z. Charumbira =

President of Pan-African Parliament

Fortune Zephania Charumbira is a Zimbabwean politician serving as president of the Zimbabwe Council of Chiefs from 2013. He also served as President of the Pan-African Parliament from 29 June 2022 until 30 April 2026, 4th Vice President of the Pan-African Parliament and Deputy Minister of the Ministry of Local Government and Public Works of Zimbabwe during the 2000s.

== See also ==
- Pan-African Parliament
