= Pan-African Parliament =

International parliament

Coordinates: 26°0′07″S 28°07′46″E

Pan-African Parliament: البرلمان الأفريقي (Arabic); Parlement panafricain (French); Parlamento Pan-Africano (Portuguese); Parlamento Panafricano (Spanish); Bunge La Afrika nzima (Swahili)

History
- Founded: 18 March 2004

Leadership
- President: Fateh Boutbig (since April 2026)
- Gayo Asherbiri, Second Vice President and Acting President

Structure
- Committees: Permanent Committees of the Pan-African Parliament: Rural Economy, Agriculture, Natural Resources, and Environment; Monetary and Financial Affairs; Trade, Customs, and Immigration Matters; Cooperation, International Relations, and Conflict Resolutions; Transport, Industry, Communications, Energy, Science, and Technology; Health, Labour, and Social Affairs; Education, Culture, Tourism, and Human Resources; Gender, Family, Youths, and People with Disabilities; Justice and Human Rights; Rules, Privileges, and Discipline; Committee on Audit and Public Accounts (CAPA)

Motto
- One Africa, One Voice

Meeting place
- Gallagher Convention Centre, Midrand, South Africa

Website
- pap.au.int

The Pan-African Parliament (PAP), also known as the African Parliament, is the legislative body of the African Union. It held its inaugural session in March 2004. The Parliament exercises oversight, and has advisory and consultative powers, having lasting for the first five years. Initially the seat of the Pan-African Parliament was in Addis Ababa, Ethiopia, but was later moved to Midrand, South Africa. The goal in establishing the parliament was creating a space where people from all states of Africa could meet, deliberate, and pass some policy on issues that affect the entire continent of Africa.

The Parliament is composed of a maximum of five members per member state that have ratified the Protocol establishing it, including at least one woman per Member State. These members are selected by their member state and their domestic legislatures. The overall goal for the parliament is to be an institution that has full legislative power whose members are elected through universal suffrage, as stated by South African President Jacob Zuma in his opening speech to the first ordinary session of the second legislature of the Pan-African Parliament on October 28, 2009.

The Pan-African Parliament is composed of three sections. The Plenary is the main legislative and deliberation section of the Parliament, where representatives meet regularly to discuss issues in Africa and potential solutions. The Bureau is the leadership section of the Parliament, made up of a president and four vice presidents, all of whom are elected by delegates in the Plenary. The final section of the Parliament is the Secretariat, which is the organizational body of the Parliament and is chaired by a Clerk, Deputy Clerk, and an Acting Deputy Clerk. Together, these structures maintain and carry out the goals and protocol set out to govern the Parliament.

At the Parliament's 2022 elections, Chief Fortune Charumbira from Zimbabwe was elected as the new President, and Massouda Mohamed Laghdaf from Mauritania, Ashebiri Gayo from Ethiopia, Lúcia Maria Mendes Gonçalves dos Passos from Cape Verde, and Francois Ango Ndoutoume from Gabon were elected as Vice Presidents.

== Structure ==
The Parliament is made up of three main bodies: the plenary, bureau, and secretariat. There are also Ten Permanent Committees and one ad hoc one, whose mandates and functions are set out in the PAP Rules of Procedure.

=== Plenary ===
The Plenary is the main decision-making body of the Parliament. The Plenary consists of the delegates from the member states, and is chaired by the President. It is the body which passes resolutions.

The Pan-African Parliament has 235 representatives that are elected by the legislatures of 47 of the 55 AU states, rather than being directly elected in their own capacity. Each member state sends a delegation of five parliamentarians to the Parliament, at least one of whom must be a woman. The composition of the delegation should reflect the political diversity of the member state's legislature.

=== Bureau ===
The Bureau is the leadership group of the Parliament and consists of the President and four vice-presidents. Each member of the Bureau represents a different region of Africa. The current members of the Bureau are:

- President - Hon. Chief Fortune Zephania Charumbira from Zimbabwe
- First Vice President - Hon. Prof Massouda Mohamed Laghdaf from Mauritania
- Second Vice President – Hon. Dr Ashebiri Gayo from Ethiopia
- Third Vice President – Hon. Lucia Dos Passos from Cape Verde
- Fourth Vice President – Hon. Djidda Mamar Mahamat from Chad

=== Secretariat ===
The Secretariat assists in the day-to-day running of the Parliament, undertaking duties such as minuting meetings, organizing elections and managing staff. The Secretariat consists of the Clerk of Parliament and two Deputy Clerks – one of whom leads the Legislative Business Department, the other the Finance, Administration, and Human Resources. The Clerk of Parliament and their deputies are also supported by other staff and functionaries when needed.

== History ==
The Abuja Treaty of 1991 and Sirte Declaration of 1999 called for the creation of a PAP. The former had simply listed the PAP among the organization's bodies and stated, "In order to ensure that the peoples of Africa are fully involved in the economic development and integration of the Continent, there shall be established a Pan-African Parliament. The composition, functions, powers and organisation of the Pan-African Parliament shall be defined in a Protocol providing thereof." The Treaty on the Establishment of the African Union and a Protocol to the Treaty Establishing the African Economic Community relating to the Pan-African Parliament followed. Then there was the Constitutive Act of the African Union. The Protocol Establishing the Pan African Parliament was adopted in 2000 during the OAU Summit in Lomé, Togo. As of 2022, the PAP has representatives hailing from 47 of the 55 AU member states. Article 22 of the PAP protocol provides for the Protocol to enter into force after deposit of the instruments of ratification by a simple majority of the member states.

The power of the Pan-African Parliament increased significantly following the 2017 AU-EU summit. Prior to 2017, the Parliament only had advisory and consultative purposes. The changes outlined and passed in 2017 effectively made the Parliament the legislative body of the African Union. These changes primarily allowed the Parliament to draft more model laws for African countries as well as altered how elections within the Parliament functioned. Prior to 2017, each member state selected 5 individuals to represent them in the Parliament. Now, the delegates from each member state are elected by their national legislature in elections that occur in the same month for all member states across all of Africa.

== Objectives ==
- Implement the policies and objectives of the African Union.
- Cultivate human rights and democracy in Africa.
- Make sure Member States adhere to good governance, transparency and accountability.
- Let the peoples of Africa know what the objectives and policies of the African Union are so that they might be able to integrate themselves continentally while still working within the framework of the AU.
- Engender peace, security and stability on the Continent.
- Promote self-reliance and economic recovery so as to lead to a more prosperous future for the peoples of Africa.
- Engender cooperation and development in Africa.
- Strengthen a sense of solidarity and build common destiny among the peoples of Africa.
- Create cooperation among Regional Economic Communities and their Members in Parliament.

== Powers ==
- Examine, discuss or express an opinion on any matter, either on its own initiative or at the request of the Assembly or other policy organs and make any recommendations it may deem fit relating to, inter alia, matters pertaining to respect of human rights, the consolidation of democratic institutions and the culture of democracy, as well as the promotion good governance and the rule of law.
- Discuss its budget and the budget of the Community and make recommendations thereon prior to its approval by the Assembly of the African Union.
- Work towards the harmonisation or co-ordination of the laws of the Member States.
- Make recommendations aimed at contributing to the attainment of the objectives of the OAU/AEC and draw attention to the challenges facing the integration process in Africa as well as the strategies for dealing with them.
- Request officials of the OAU/AEC to attend its sessions, produce documents or assist in the discharge of its duties.
- Promote the programmes and objectives of the OAU/AEC, in the constituencies of the Member States.
- Promote the co-ordination and Harmonization of policies, measures, programmes and activities of the Regional Economic Communities and the parliamentary fora of Africa.
- Adopt its Rules of Procedure, elect its own President and propose to the Council and the Assembly the size and nature of the support staff of the Pan-African Parliament.
- Perform such other functions as it deems appropriate to achieve the objectives set out in Article 3 of the Protocol.

Between 2006 and 2019, the Parliament carried out fact-finding missions on peace, security and conflicts in the areas of the Great Lakes, the Democratic Republic of Congo, Darfur in the Sudan, Central African Republic, Chad, Saharawi Arab Democratic Republic, Mali, Libya, South Sudan, Burundi and Niger.

== Challenges ==
=== Elections ===
==== General Elections ====
While the goal of the Pan-African Parliament is to hold free and fair elections, there are many factors that limit elections from meeting these qualifications. Delegates are elected by their respective member states, and malpractice in elections such as intimidation of the electorate and the rigging of the election results are not uncommon in Africa. In some Member States this takes the form of Electoral Commissions colluding with political leaders and publish inauthentic results. There is only so much that the Pan-African Parliament can do to ensure that elections are being conducted in a manner that creates a truly democratic environment in the Parliament, and thus they are limited by their member states in accomplishing this goal.

==== 2021 Bureau Elections ====
When Roger Nkodo Dang's latest three-year term ended in May 2021, the Pan-African Parliament met to elect a new president and vice-presidents. The meeting proved to be unfruitful as the constituencies from western and central Africa did not come to a consensus on who would lead the Bureau. There were even physical altercations between lawmakers and members of the parliament, with some people even grabbing the ballot box itself. As such, the meeting adjourned with an unclear understanding of who would head the Pan-African Parliament in the future. The African Union stepped in during November 2021 to help provide aid to the Pan-African Parliament to complete their elections and return the parliament back to order. Bouras Djamel served as tentative leader of the parliament.

==== 2022 Bureau Elections ====
Fortune Charumbira was elected President of the Pan-African Parliament on 29 June 2022 during the Parliament's Ordinary Session in Midrand, South Africa.

==== 2026 Bureau Elections ====
At the Extraordinary Session of the Seventh Legislature, held from 28 to 30 April 2026 at its headquarters in Midrand, South Africa, a new Bureau was elected to lead the institution for the next three years. The Hon. Fateh Boutbig, Algeria, was elected as president.

=== Language ===
There is a fairly significant issue of language in the Pan-African Parliament. Arabic, English, French and Portuguese are the four working languages currently in the Parliament. However, there is some desire for indigenous languages to be accommodated as working languages. The argument behind this is that three of the four listed above (excluding Arabic) are a reminder of the colonial roots and old order in Africa. This problem is further emphasized by the representation within the Parliament, as all countries regardless of population are represented by the same number of delegates.

=== Bureaucratic ===
Throughout Africa, there are many different forms of formal and informal government that are successful to different extents. Many governments face the issue of the "president for life," where African leaders in government refuse to relinquish their power. On top of this, there are also governments who see more tumultuous governmental structures with constant changes in their constitutions. In both of these cases, contributions that some countries can make to the Pan-African Parliament are limited because these situations make it difficult to send delegates to the Parliament, and ensure that they are representative of the citizens from their respective member states. Corruption is also a continent-wide issue in Africa. Because the Parliament requires its member states to pay African Union and Pan-African Parliament subscription fees, corruption within a member state can lead to subscription money going to government officials. This would negatively affect the Parliament as it would have less funding and thus be able to accomplish less being that they would have a smaller budget than anticipated.

== Meetings ==
The Pan-African Parliament is able to meet in an ordinary session up to twice in a year, usually in March and August. These ordinary sessions are regular meetings in which issues in Africa are discussed, and legislature can be voted on and passed to meet the needs of Africa as members of the Pan-African Parliament see fit, and last up to a month long. The permanent committees of the parliament always meet twice a year for statutory meetings, and can convene as often as they see fit during ordinary sessions of parliament for non-statutory meetings. The parliament can also meet in extraordinary sessions in case of emergency or some other extenuating circumstances.

During some of these meetings, elections are held to elect the Acting President and Vice Presidents of the Bureau. These positions are chaired by members of the Parliament hailing from the 5 regions of Africa: northern, central, eastern, western, and southern, with the Acting President hailing from any one of these regions. The candidates must be ratified by the Plenary before ballots can be cast on who will actually be voted in.

== Legislative power ==
Prior to the changes made to the Pan-African Parliament in 2017, not a single law was passed by the parliament. However, the changes outlined in 2017 shifted the Parliament into a more full legislative body representing the African Union, granting the parliament the ability to draft and pass Model Laws for its member states to adopt. Now, the Parliament can receive, consider, and submit opinions on draft legal instruments, treaties and other international agreements. Furthermore, the Parliament has power in accordance with the Financial Rules and regulations set by the African Union, such that they can control their own fund-raising activities through legislative action. All legislation that is proposed by the Parliament must be submitted to the AU Assembly for its final ratification and approval.

=== Model Laws ===
==== Process ====
The Model Law development process in the Pan-African Parliament consists of three main stages: the initiation stage, formulation stage and approval stage. The Model Law Formulation Initiative can originate from a few different channels within the Parliament. It could arise from: the Plenary, a Parliament committee, the Bureau, an individual Member of the Parliament or a group of Parliament members, a thematic caucus, an AU Organ or an institution, a Civil Society Organization registered in an AU Member State, or from a citizen of a Member State or a juristic person registered in an AU Member State. The Secretariat provides technical guidance to the political organs of the Parliament in regards to their decision to initiate the process of Model Law Formulation. The Bureau then selects a permanent committee which best fits the proposed Model Law to determine if the Model Law is suitable, feasible, and would be effective using an opportunity, legal and capacity test which determines if these qualities are met by a proposed Model Law. The results of these tests are then passed to the Plenary, who vote on if the Model Law is to be drafted. If it is, then the Model Law goes through an extensive drafting and adoption stage before ultimately being submitted to the African Union for approval.

==== Passed Model Laws ====
One example of a model law approved by the Pan-African Parliament that was approved by the AU Assembly is a law regarding policing in Africa. This law was approved by the Parliament in 2018 and fully passed by the AU Assembly in 2022 and aims to change police in Africa from what they termed as "oppressive to one that respects and promotes democracy and peoples rights" to a group that better controls the "role, powers, conduct and discipline and conditions of employment of Police officers." The three main goals of the model law are: the democratic and civilian control of police; the rule of law; and human rights compliant standards of policing. The Law includes inputs from a broad range of African policing experts and reflects a "best practice" legislative model that can be applied across the various legal traditions and policing structures that are found on the continent. Indeed, the Committee recognized early in the process that a participatory and inclusive methodology would be vital to ensure its relevance to African policing governance, as well as to promote its visibility and use by stakeholders.

== Trust fund ==
A trust fund was established 26 May 2005. In the motion to create the fund, it was said the Pan-African Parliament Trust Fund will promote "good governance, transparency and democracy, peace security and stability, gender equality and development in the integration of African people within Africa and other nations. It will also support the fight against HIV/AIDS, hunger and poverty on the continent".

== Presidents of the Pan-African Parliament ==
President of the Pan-African Parliament
- Incumbent; Fateh Boutbig since 2026
- Appointer: The Assembly
- Term length: Three years
- Inaugural holder: Gertrude Mongella
- Formation: 2000; 26 years ago

Organization of African Unity
No.	Name	Beginning of term	End of term	Country
1	Gertrude Mongella	2004	2008	Tanzania
2	Idriss Ndele Moussa	2009	2012	Chad
3	Bethel Nnaemeka Amadi	2012	2015	Nigeria
4	Roger Nkodo Dang	May 2015	April 2020	Cameroon
5	Fortune Z. Charumbira	April 2020	August 2020	Zimbabwe
6	Bouras Djamel	August 2020	June 2022	Algeria
7	Fortune Z. Charumbira	June 2022	April 2026	Zimbabwe
8	Fateh Boutbig	April 2026	incumbent	Algeria

== See also ==
- List of members of the Pan-African Parliament
- Bureau of the Pan-African Parliament
- United States of Africa
- African Parliamentary Union, another inter-parliamentary institution only of some African countries
- Parliamentary Assembly of the Council of Europe, the European equivalent
