= Saint John Capisterre Parish =

Coordinates: 17°23′13″N 62°47′49″W

Saint John Capisterre
- Parish
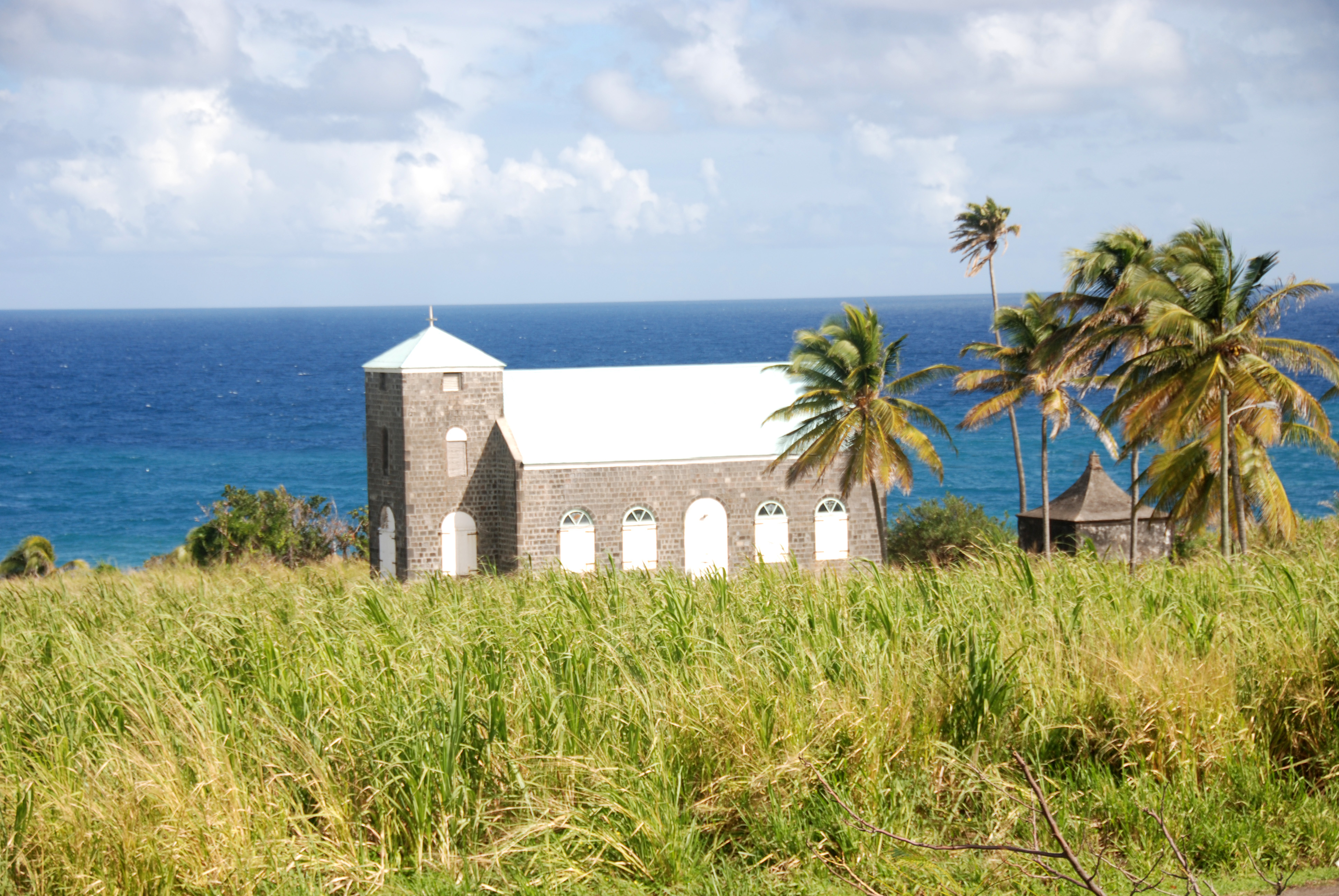
- Church at Saddlers

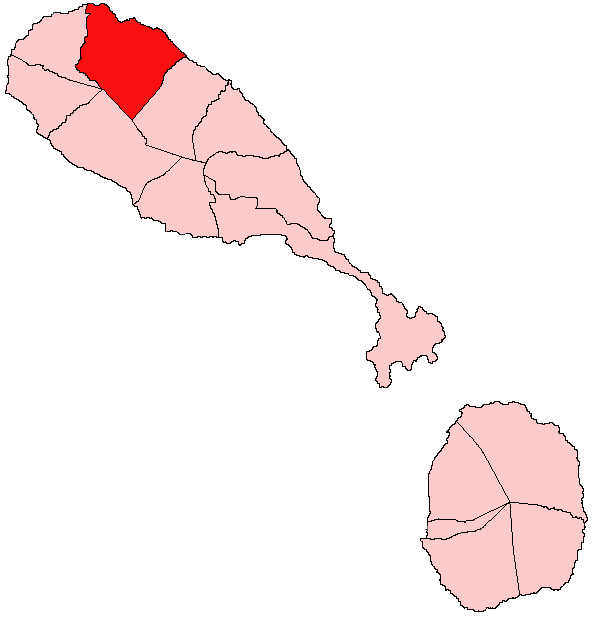
- Country: Saint Kitts and Nevis
- Capital: Dieppe Bay Town

Area
  - Total: 25 km^{2} (9.7 sq mi)

Population (2011)
  - Total: 2,962
  - Density: 118/km^{2} (310/sq mi)

Saint John Capisterre is one of 14 administrative parishes that make up Saint Kitts and Nevis. It is the second largest parish on Saint Kitts (after Saint George Basseterre Parish), and the third largest parish in the federation (the largest being Saint James Windward Parish). The capital of the parish is Dieppe Bay Town.

== Land ==
The parish's 5 mile coastline is one of the most impressive and varied in the federation. The northern coasts consist of long beaches with black volcanic sand. Large offshore reef formations almost completely surround Dieppe Bay Beach, creating the island's safest natural harbour. The other beaches, namely Parson's Beach and Sandy Bay, however, lack this protection and are battered by the turbulent waves of the Atlantic Ocean. The southern coasts contain one of the island's most noted natural features, Black Rocks. Stretching for almost 2 miles, these large metamorphic rock projections are the result of St. Kitts' last volcanic eruption (estimated to be in the 14th century) when lava poured down the slopes of Mount Liamuiga creeping until it met the Atlantic Ocean, where it cooled and hardened. Shaped and formed by wave action over the years, the many grottoes, pools and projections that now line the area are a testament to the island's volcanicity. Saint John Capisterre is also home to the tallest peak in the Leeward Islands, Mount Liamuiga, whose crater lake marks the boundary for Saint Paul Capisterre, Saint Anne Sandy Point and Saint Thomas Middle Island. The parish's interior is completely dominated by Liamuiga and other peaks of the North West and Central Ranges, covered with tropical forests. Below 1000 feet, the forests give way to small farm holdings and abandoned sugar cane estates. The parish is a main producer for tropical fruit on the island.

== Towns and villages ==
The largest town in the parish is Saddler's, with a population of around 2,000. The village of Tabernacle is the second largest settlement. Another main settlement in the parish is the town of Dieppe, the first French settlement on the island, and parish capital (although Saddler's functions as a second parish capital). Other settlements include Parson's Ground Village, Pogson Village, Lynch's Village, Harris' Village and Belle Vue. Due to the rough Atlantic coastline, only the reef-protected towns of Dieppe Bay and Parson's hug the coast. All other settlements are further inland. Tabernacle is further recognized locally, being founded by newly emancipated slaves in the late 19th century.

Capitals

- Dieppe Bay,
- Saddlers (largest village)

Other Villages:

- Parson's
- Harris'
- Belle Vue
- Tabernacle

== Economy ==
The main employer in the parish is agriculture. The fertile slopes of Mount Liamuiga are home to many small farms and a wide variety of tropical fruits are grown for local consumption, mainly acerola, avocado, banana, breadfruit, carambola, cashew, mango, papaya, sugar apple, and golden apple. Tourism is also a key industry here. The Golden Lemon Hotel, one of the island's most exclusive and expensive, situated on Dieppe Bay Beach, is a large employer of the population. The rich reefs of Dieppe are a major local fishing ground, and are also a popular snorkeling area. The rougher Sandy Bay has grown into a local surfing spot, and for those even more adventurous, climbing down the cliffs of Black Rocks to bathe in the elusive pools provides a challenge. The most recent addition to the parish is the Beaumont Park Race Track, hailed as one of the finest in the region, near the town of Dieppe Bay. The Race track offers horse and greyhound racing, as well as facilities for state-of-the-art gambling.

== Port ==
In the 17th century, the port of Dieppe Bay Town, the island's most protected harbour, was a hub of activity, and served the former French region of Capisterre, from which the parish derives part of its name. After full British control in 1713, however, its functions as an international port ceased. Today, the harbour is used as a base for the local coast guard, for docking small fishing vessels, and also as a dock for small vessels in turbulent weather.

== Community festivals ==
Saint John Capisterre is home to three community festivals, more than any other parish (except Saint George Basseterre which has the same number). They are la festival de Capisterre, Saddlefest, and Festab. Festival de Capisterre is held in Northern St. Kitts, a region formerly held by France (17th century) which was named Capesterre (land facing the wind, as opposed to Basseterre, meaning land sheltered from the wind). The four villages of the region (Newton Ground and Saint Paul Capisterre in Saint Paul Capisterre and Dieppe and Parson's in Saint John Capisterre) thus annually hold the festival in mid-September to celebrate the distinction. Saddlefest is a community festival held in the large village of Saddlers. It features calypso shows, beauty pageants, late night liming and street jam sessions. Festab is the final festival, with many similar activities to Saddlefest, but held in the village of Tabernacle, and with its own unique styles and charms.

== Future ==
Beaumont Heights villas, surrounding the Beaumont Park area, is currently being developed as a high-end housing area. The Saddle Hill Adventure Park, which broke ground in January 2013, is also expected to further improve the parish as an area of fun and activity for tourists and locals alike.
