= History of the Comoros (1978–2001) =

Former African country

Federal Islamic Republic of the Comoros
- 1978–2001
- Flag (1978–1992) Coat of arms
- Anthem: Udzima wa ya Masiwa (Comorian); The Unity of the Great Islands
- Location of the Comoros (circled)
- Capital: Moroni
- Official languages: French, Comorian, Arabic
- Religion: Islam
- Demonym: Comorian
- Government: Federal presidential Islamic Republic
- President
  - 1978: Ahmed Abdallah and Mohamed Ahmed
  - 1978-1989: Ahmed Abdallah
  - 1989-1990: Said Mohamed Djohar (acting)
  - 1990–1995: Said Mohamed Djohar (first term)
  - 1995: Combo Ayouba
  - 1995: Mohamed Taki Abdoulkarim and Said Ali Kemal (acting)
  - 1995–1996: Caabi El-Yachroutu Mohamed (interim)
  - 1996: Said Mohamed Djohar (second term)
  - 1996-1998: Mohamed Taki Abdoulkarim
  - 1998–1999: Tadjidine Ben Said Massounde (acting)
  - 1999–2001: Azali Assoumani
- Prime Minister
  - 1978: Abdallah Mohamed (first)
  - 2000-2001: Hamada Madi (last)
- Military Leader of the Comoros
  - 1978–1989: Bob Denard
- History
  - Establishment of the Federal Islamic Republic of Comoros: 23 May 1978
  - Constitution of the Federal Islamic Republic of Comoros becomes effective: 1 October 1978
  - Disestablishment of the Federal Islamic Republic of Comoros: 23 December 2001
- ISO 3166 code: KM
Preceded by	Succeeded by
State of the Comoros	Comoros
- Today part of: Comoros

The Comoros is an island nation in the Indian Ocean, located off the eastern coast of Africa. France first established colonial rule in the Comoros in 1841. Agreement was reached with France in 1973 for the Comoros to become independent in 1978. On 6 July 1975, but the Comorian parliament passed a unilateral resolution declaring independence. The deputies of Mayotte, which remained under French control, abstained. Referendums on all four of the islands excluding Mayotte showed strong support for independence. Ahmed Abdallah proclaimed the Comoros' independence on 5 September 1975 and became its first president.

In 1978, president Ali Soilih, who had a firm anti-French attitude, was killed and Ahmed Abdallah came to power. Under the reign of Abdallah, Bob Denard was commander of the Presidential Guard (PG) and de facto ruler of the country, trained, supported and funded by the white regimes in South Africa (SA) and Rhodesia (now Zimbabwe) in return to the permission to set up a secret listening station on the islands to spy on the African National Congress and the Frontline States. The Comoros was also used for evading arms sanctions.

When in 1981 François Mitterrand was elected president Denard lost the support of the French intelligence service, but he managed to strengthen the link between SA and the Comoros. Besides the Guard, Denard established his own company SOGECOM, in both the security and building business. He seemed to be pretty rich. In period 1985-87 the relationship of the PG with the local Comorians became worse.

At the end of the 1980s the South Africans did not want to continue to support a mercenary regime and France also wanted to get rid of the mercenaries. Finally, also President Abdallah wanted the mercenaries to leave. Their response was a (third) coup and the death of President Abdallah in which Denard and his men were probably involved. The SA and the French government subsequently forced Denard and his mercenaries to leave the islands in 1989.

== Beginning of the Abdallah regime ==
Following a few days of provisional government, the two men who had financed the coup, former president Ahmed Abdallah (himself the victim of the 1975 coup) and former vice president Mohamed Ahmed, returned to Moroni from exile in Paris and installed themselves as joint presidents. Soon after, Abdallah was named sole executive.

The continued presence of the mercenaries impeded Abdallah's early efforts to stabilize the Comoros. Bob Denard seemed interested in remaining in the Comoros, and he and his friends were given financially rewarding appointments with the new government. In reaction to Denard's involvement with Abdallah, the Organisation of African Unity (OAU) revoked the Comoros' OAU membership, Madagascar severed diplomatic relations, and the United Nations (UN) threatened economic sanctions against the regime. France also exerted pressure for Denard to leave, and in late September—temporarily, as it developed—he departed the islands.

Abdallah consolidated power, beginning with the writing of a new constitution. The document combined federalism and centralism. It granted each island its own legislature and control over taxes levied on individuals and businesses resident on the island (perhaps with an eye to rapprochement with Mahoré), while reserving strong executive powers for the president. It also restored Islam as the state religion, while acknowledging the rights of those who did not observe the Muslim faith. The new constitution was approved by over 99% of Comoran voters in a referendum held on 1 October 1978. Later in the month Abdallah was elected to a six-year term as president of what was now known as the Federal Islamic Republic of the Comoros.

Although Abdallah had been president when the Comoros broke away from France in 1975, he now moved to establish a relationship much more to France's liking. Upon Denard's departure, he gave a French military mission responsibility for training the Comoros' defense force. He also signed an agreement with France to allow its navy full use of Comoran port facilities.

Making the most of the Comoros' new presidential system, Abdallah induced the nation's National Assembly to enact a twelve-year ban on political parties, a move that guaranteed his reelection in 1984. In 1979 his government arrested Soilih regime members who had not already left or been killed during the 1978 coup. Four former ministers of the Soilih government disappeared and allegedly were murdered, and about 300 other Soilih supporters were imprisoned without trial. For the next three years, occasional trials were held, in many cases only after France had insisted on due process for the prisoners.

Although the restoration of good relations with France represented a sharp break with the policies of the previous regime, Abdallah built on Soilih's efforts to find new sources of diplomatic and economic support. Thanks in large part to aid from the European Community and the Arab states, the regime began to upgrade roads, telecommunications, and port facilities. The government also accepted international aid for programs to increase the cultivation of cash crops and food for domestic consumption. Abdallah endeavored to maintain the relations established by Soilih with China, Nigeria, and Tanzania, and to expand the Comoros' contacts in the Islamic world with visits to Libya and the Persian Gulf states.

Despite international assistance, economic development was slow. Although some Comorans blamed the French, who had yet to restore technical assistance to pre-1975 levels, others suspected that Abdallah, who owned a large import-export firm, was enriching himself from development efforts with the assistance of Denard, who continued to visit the Comoros.

Opposition to the Abdallah regime began to appear as early as 1979, with the formation of an exile-dominated group that became known as the United National Front of Comorians–Union of Comorians (Front National Uni des Komoriens–Union des Komoriens, or FNUK or Unikom). In 1980 the Comoran ambassador to France, Said Ali Kemal, resigned his position to form another opposition group, the National Committee for Public Safety (Comité National de Salut Public). A failed coup in February 1981, led by a former official of the Soilih regime, resulted in arrests of about forty people.

In regard to Mahoré, Abdallah offered little more than verbal resistance to a 1979 decision of the French government to postpone action on the status of the island until 1984. At the same time, he kept the door open to Mahoré by writing a large measure of autonomy for the component islands of the republic into the 1978 constitution and by appointing a Mahorais as his government's minister of finance. Having established an administration that, in comparison with the Soilih years, seemed tolerable to his domestic and international constituencies, Abdallah proceeded to entrench himself through domestic and international policies that profoundly compromised the Comoros' independence.

== The undermining of the political process ==
In February 1982, the Comoros became a one-party state. The government designated Abdallah's newly formed Comorian Union for Progress (Union Comorienne pour le Progrès, or UCP) as the republic's sole political party. Although unaffiliated individuals could run for local and national office, the only party that could organize on behalf of candidates henceforth would be the UCP. In the March 1982 elections, all but one of Abdallah's handpicked UCP candidates won. UCP candidates likewise dominated the 1983 elections and opposition candidates attempting to stand for election in balloting for the three islands' legislative councils in July were removed from the lists by the Ministry of Interior. Abdallah himself was elected to a second six-year term as head of state in September 1984, winning more than 99 percent of the vote as the sole candidate. During the National Assembly elections of 22 March 1987, the Abdallah regime arrested 400 poll watchers from opposition groups. A state radio announcement that one non-UCP delegate had been elected was retracted the next day.

Abdallah also kept opponents from competing with him in the arena of legitimate politics by reshuffling his government and amending the 1978 constitution. As part of what one observer wryly called the process of "remov[ing] his most avid successors from temptation," Abdallah pushed through a constitutional amendment in 1985 that abolished the post of prime minister, a move that made the president both head of state and head of the elected government. The amendment also diminished the status of Ali Mroudjae, the erstwhile prime minister and a likely future candidate for president. Another 1985 amendment took away many of the powers of the president of the National Assembly, including his right to become interim head of state in the event of the incumbent's death. The amendment transferred the right of succession to the president of the Supreme Court, an appointee of the head of state. Feeling the effect of this second amendment was assembly president Mohamed Taki Abdoulkarim, another man generally regarded as presidential timber.

Mroudjae's subsequent career in the Abdallah government illustrated the way in which Abdallah used frequent reshufflings of his cabinet to eliminate potential challengers. Mroudjae's next job was to share duties as minister of state with four other people; he was removed from the government altogether in another reshuffle four months later.

Looking to the end of his second (and, according to the constitution, final) term as head of state, Abdallah created a commission in 1988 to recommend changes to the constitution. These changes, among other things, would permit him to run yet again in 1990. A referendum on revisions to the constitution was scheduled for 4 November 1989.

A weak, divided, and opportunistic opposition facilitated Abdallah's efforts to undermine the political process. The character of Comoran politics ensured that opposition would be sustained by an unwieldy group of strong personalities. As the personal stock of these would-be leaders rose and fell, coalitions coalesced and just as quickly fell apart in a process that engendered distrust and cynicism. The ban on opposition political organizations at home—brutally upheld, when necessary, by the Presidential Guard (Garde Presidentelle—GP) and the Comoran military—further undercut efforts to organize against the head of state. The French government's displeasure at intrigues of Comoran exiles in Paris also complicated opposition efforts.

Given the absence of an ideological basis for resisting the regime, it was also not surprising that some opposition leaders were willing to ally themselves with the head of state if such a move appeared likely to advance them personally. For example, Mouzaoir Abdallah, leader of the opposition Union for a Democratic Republic in the Comoros (Union pour une République Démocratique aux Comores, URDC), appeared with the president at independence day celebrations in July 1988 amid rumors that the URDC chief was being considered for a reconstituted prime minister's office. In September 1988 another opposition leader, Said Hachim, agreed to join the commission considering revisions to the constitution.

The credibility of Abdallah's opponents was also damaged by the efforts of one opposition leader, former ambassador to France Said Ali Kemal, to recruit mercenaries to help overthrow the Abdallah government. Arrested in Australia in late 1983, six of the mercenaries gave testimony discrediting Kemal.

== Mercenary rule ==
Abdallah complemented his political maneuvers by employing a GP officered by many of the same mercenaries who had helped him take power in 1978. Denard led this force, and also became heavily involved in Comoran business activities, sometimes acting in partnership with President Abdallah or as a front for South African business interests, which played a growing role in the Comoran economy during the Abdallah regime.

Although Denard had made a ceremonial departure from the Comoros following the 1978 coup, by the early 1980s he was again openly active in the islands. The GP, whose numbers were reported to range from 300 to 700 members, primarily indigenous Comorans, were led by about thirty French and Belgian mercenaries, mostly comrades of Denard's in the post-World War II conflicts that accompanied the decolonization of Africa and Asia. Answerable only to the president, the GP operated outside the chain of command of the French-trained 1,000-member Comoran Armed Forces, a situation that caused resentment among the regular military, Comoran citizens, and other African states.

The GP's primary missions were to protect the president and to deter attempts to overthrow his government. During the July 1983 elections to the three islands' legislative councils, the GP beat and arrested demonstrators protesting the republic's one-party system. During elections to the National Assembly in March 1987, the GP—which had become known as les affreux, "the frighteners"—replaced several hundred dissident poll watchers who had been arrested by the army. On 8 March 1985, one of the most serious attempts to overthrow the Abdallah government began as a mutiny by about thirty Comoran troops of the GP against their European officers. The disaffected guards had formed ties to the Democratic Front (Front Démocratique, FD), one of the more nationalistic of the republic's many banned political parties. The mutiny was quickly squelched; three of the rebellious guards were killed, and the rest were taken prisoners.

President Abdallah used the uprising as an opportunity to round up dissidents, primarily FD members, whose leadership denied involvement in the coup attempt. Later in 1985, seventy-seven received convictions; seventeen, including the FD's secretary general, Mustapha Said Cheikh, were sentenced to life imprisonment at hard labor. Most of the prisoners were released in 1986 following Amnesty International charges of illegal arrests, torture, and other abuses. France had also exerted pressure by temporarily withholding new aid projects and purchases of Comoran vanilla.

Perhaps the most notorious action of the GP on behalf of the Abdallah government occurred in November 1987. After an apparent attempt by dissidents to free some political prisoners, an event quickly labeled a coup attempt by the Abdallah regime, the GP arrested fourteen alleged plotters and tortured seven of them to death. Officials of the Comoran government apparently were not allowed to participate in the prisoners' interrogation. President Abdallah was on a state visit to Egypt at the time.

With Abdallah's acquiescence and occasional participation, Denard and the other GP officers used their connections to the head of state to make themselves important players in the Comoran economy. Denard was a part owner of Établissements Abdallah et Fils, the Comoros' largest import-export firm, whose primary owner was President Abdallah. Denard also owned and operated a highly profitable commercial shuttle between South Africa and the Comoros, and owned Sogecom, a private security firm with contracts to protect South African hotels being built in the islands.

The GP officers, sympathetic to South Africa's apartheid government, established themselves as a conduit of South African investment and influence in the Comoros. An official South African trade representative conceded that a number of his country's investment projects, including a 525-hectare experimental farm, housing, road construction, and a medical evacuation program, were brokered and managed by guard officers at the mercenaries' insistence.

The GP also arranged for South African commercial aircraft to fly in the Middle East and parts of Africa under the aegis of the Comoran national airline, in contravention of international sanctions against South Africa. Furthermore, the GP provided for South African use of Comoran territory as a base for intelligence gathering in the Mozambique Channel and as a staging area for the shipment of arms to rightist rebels in Mozambique. The GP was widely understood to be funded by South Africa, at the rate of about US$3 million per year.

== Comoros as client state: the economics of Abdallah ==
President Abdallah generally put his personal interests ahead of national interests in making economic policy. The result was the creation of a client state whose meager and unpredictable cash crop earnings were supplemented with increasing infusions of foreign aid.

Throughout the 1980s, export earnings from the Comoros' four main cash crops—vanilla, ylang-ylang, cloves, and copra—experienced a wrenching sequence of booms and collapses because of weather and market factors, or else steadily dwindled. The regime's principal form of response was to apply the president's considerable diplomatic skills to developing an extensive network of governments and international organizations willing to extend loans and donate aid. The main suppliers were France, South Africa, the European Community, the conservative Arab states, the World Bank and related organs, and regional financial institutions such as the Arab Bank for Economic Development in Africa and the African Development Bank. Some assistance went to projects of indisputable value, such as efforts to create independent news media and improve telephone communications with the outside world. Much of the aid, however, was questionable—for example, loans and grants to help the republic meet the payroll for its oversized civil service. Other more plausible projects, such as the protracted development of a seaport at the town of Mutsamudu, construction of paved ring roads linking each island's coastal settlements, and the building of power stations, nonetheless tended to be instances of placing the cart before the horse. That is, capital-intensive improvements to infrastructure had not been coordinated with local development projects; hence, little, if any, domestic commerce existed to benefit from road networks, electrical power, and world-class port facilities.

The importation of huge quantities of building materials and construction equipment provided immediate benefits to import-export firms in the islands, of which Établissements Abdallah et Fils was the largest. In the meantime, the projects were of little immediate use to Comorans and were likely to go underused for years to come.

Throughout the Abdallah period, rice imports drained as much as 50 percent of Comoran export earnings. Projects to increase food self-sufficiency, as one observer noted, "fail[ed] to respond to the largesse" provided by international sponsors such as the European Development Fund and the International Fund for Agricultural Development. The president joined with vanilla growers in resisting international pressure to divert vanilla-producing land to the cultivation of corn and rice for domestic consumption. He also declined to heed World Bank advice to impose tariffs and domestic taxes on imported rice. Abdallah's import-export firm was heavily involved in vanilla exports, as well as in the importation of Far Eastern rice at three times its price at the source.

Abdallah's firm, whose co-owners included Denard and Kalfane and Company, a Pakistani concern, also profited from managing the importation of materials used by South African firms in developing tourist hotels. Little of the material used in building these resorts was of Comoran origin. Also, once completed, the resorts would be almost entirely owned and managed by non-Comorans. Although tourism, mainly by South Africans who were unwelcome in other African resorts, was widely considered the only promising new industry in the Comoros, Abdallah guided its development so that resorts benefited few Comorans other than himself and his associates.

Under Abdallah's tutelage, the Comoran economy finished the 1980s much as it had started the decade—poor, underdeveloped, and dependent on export earnings from cash crops of unpredictable and generally declining value. The critical difference, with enormous implications for the republic's capacity to have some say in its own destiny, was its new status as a nation abjectly in debt. By 1988, the last full year of the Abdallah regime, 80 percent of annual public expenditures were funded by external aid.

== The demise of Abdallah, 1989 ==
Only weeks before the violent end of the Abdallah regime in late 1989, one observer noted that the "Comoros is still run like a village, with a handful of tough men in charge and supported by foreign aid." As Comorans prepared for a 4 November 1989, referendum on constitutional changes that would enable President Abdallah to run for a third term in 1990, human rights remained in precarious condition, and the only avenue of economic advancement for most islanders—the civil service—faced cutbacks at the urging of the World Bank and the International Monetary Fund. Even those who would keep their government jobs, however, were not guaranteed economic security. As often occurred whenever export earnings slid, civil servants had not been paid since mid-summer.

The official result of the referendum was a 92.5 percent majority in favor of the amendments proposed by Abdallah, which now created "the conditions for a life presidency", warned one opposition leader. Balloting was marked by the now customary manipulation by the government. Opposition groups reported that polling places lacked private voting booths, government officials blocked the entry of opposition poll watchers, and the army and police removed ballot boxes before voting ended. Reaction to these abuses was unusually angry. In Njazidja voters smashed ballot boxes rather than have them carted away by the army; the governor's office was set on fire in Nzwani, and a bomb was found outside the home of the minister of finance in Moroni. More than 100 people were arrested following the election, and in subsequent weeks the international media described a deteriorating situation in the islands; the head of state claimed that France "authorizes terrorism in the Comoros", and leaders of the banned opposition in bold public statements questioned the legitimacy of the referendum.

President Abdallah was shot to death on the night of 26–27 November, reportedly while asleep in his residence, the Beit el Salama (House of Peace). At first his death was seen as a logical outcome of the tense political situation following what was, in effect, his self-appointment as head of state for life. The recently dismissed head of the Comoran military was duly blamed for the murder.

Evidence emerged subsequently that Abdallah's assassination resulted from the late president's proposed actions with regard to the GP. In September 1989, Abdallah had engaged a French military consultant, who determined that the GP should be absorbed into the regular army. Following consultations among Abdallah, the French government, and South Africa's Ministry of Foreign Affairs, a decision was made to expel Denard and his fellow officers of the GP by the end of 1989. Denard and his second in command were seen walking with Abdallah only hours before he died. Although the mercenary initially blamed the assassination on the Comoran army, he later conceded that he was in Abdallah's office when the president was killed, but called the shooting "an accident due to the general state of mayhem" in the Beit al Salama.

Two days later, on 29 November, the real reasons for the assassination emerged when Denard and the GP seized control of the government in a coup. Twenty-seven police officers were killed, hundreds of people were arrested, and all journalists were confined to their hotels. The mercenaries disarmed the regular army, ousted provisional president Haribon Chebani, who as chief of the Supreme Court had succeeded Abdallah, and installed Mohamed Said Djohar, who just three days earlier had become chief of the Supreme Court, as the Comoros' third president in less than a week.

The immediate reaction of the republic's two main supporters, France and South Africa, was to isolate Denard. South Africa, admitting years of funding of the GP, cut off all aid. France began a military build-up on Mahoré and likewise suspended aid. On 7 December, anti-Denard demonstrations by about 1,000 students and workers were violently broken up by the protests. By then the islands' school system had shut down, and the civil service had gone on strike. Faced with an untenable situation, Denard surrendered to French forces without a fight on 15 December. Along with about two dozen comrades, he was flown to Pretoria and put under house arrest. The French government later announced that Denard would remain in detention in South Africa pending the outcome of a French judicial inquiry into Abdallah's death. In February 1993 he returned to France, where he was initially arrested, tried, and exonerated of involvement in the death of Abdallah.
