= List of sovereign states in the 2000s =

This is a list of sovereign states in the 2000s, giving an overview of states around the world during the period between 1 January 2000 and 31 December 2009. It contains 213 entries, arranged alphabetically, with information on the status and recognition of their sovereignty. It includes 194 widely recognized sovereign states, 2 associated states, and 17 entities which claim an effective sovereignty but are considered de facto dependencies of other powers by the general international community.

Map of the World in 2001

== Members or observers of the United Nations ==
Name and capital city	Status and recognition of sovereignty
=== A ===
→ → → Afghanistan; Capital: Taloqan (to 6 September 2000), Fayzabad (from 6 September 2000 to 13 November 2001), Kabul (from 13 November 2001): Islamic State of Afghanistan (to 7 December 2001 in Northern Alliance zone; from 7 December 2001 to 13 June 2002) (Note: A transitional government for Afghanistan was appointed on 13 June 2002 by a loya jirga.); Transitional Islamic State of Afghanistan (from 13 June 2002 to 26 January 2004) (Note: Afghanistan ratified a new constitution on 26 January 2004.); Islamic Republic of Afghanistan (from 26 January 2004)	Widely recognized UN member state. (Note: The Islamic State of Afghanistan was not recognized by Pakistan, Saudi Arabia, or the United Arab Emirates until 7 December 2001.) Claimed to be and was widely recognized as the sole legitimate government of Afghanistan, however in effect it only controlled a small portion of the country until 13 November 2001.
→ Albania – Republic of Albania; Capital: Tirana	Widely recognized UN member state.
Algeria – People's Democratic Republic of Algeria; Capital: Algiers	Widely recognized UN member state.
Andorra – Principality of Andorra; Capital: Andorra la Vella	Widely recognized UN member state. The President of France and Bishop of Urgell were ex officio Co-Princes of Andorra. The defense of Andorra was the responsibility of France and Spain.
Angola – Republic of Angola; Capital: Luanda	Widely recognized UN member state.
Antigua and Barbuda; Capital: St. John's	Widely recognized UN member state; Commonwealth realm. Antigua and Barbuda had two dependencies, Barbuda and Redonda.
Argentina – Argentine Republic (Note: The name "Argentine Nation" was also used for the purposes of legislation.); Capital: Buenos Aires	Widely recognized UN member state. Argentina was a federation of 23 provinces and an autonomous city. (Note: 23 provinces: Buenos Aires, Catamarca, Chaco, Chubut, Córdoba, Corrientes, Entre Ríos, Formosa, Jujuy, La Pampa, La Rioja, Mendoza, Misiones, Neuquén, Río Negro, Salta, San Juan, San Luis, Santa Cruz, Santa Fe, Santiago del Estero, Tierra del Fuego, Tucumán. 1 autonomous city: Buenos Aires.) It had a claim over Argentine Antarctica, which was suspended under the Antarctic Treaty. It also claimed the Falkland Islands and South Georgia and the South Sandwich Islands, both of which were British overseas territories.
Armenia – Republic of Armenia; Capital: Yerevan	Widely recognized UN member state.
Australia – Commonwealth of Australia; Capital: Canberra	Widely recognized UN member state; Commonwealth realm. Australia was a federation of six states and three territories. (Note: 6 states: New South Wales, Queensland, South Australia, Tasmania, Victoria, Western Australia. 3 territories: Australian Capital Territory, Jervis Bay Territory, Northern Territory.) It had sovereignty over the following external territories: Ashmore and Cartier Islands; Australian Antarctic Territory (suspended under the Antarctic Treaty.); Christmas Island; Cocos (Keeling) Islands; Coral Sea Islands; Heard Island and McDonald Islands; Norfolk Island
→ Austria – Republic of Austria; Capital: Vienna	Widely recognized UN member state; EU member. Austria was a federation of nine states. (Note: 9 states: Burgenland, Carinthia, Lower Austria, Salzburg, Styria, Tyrol, Upper Austria, Vorarlberg, Vienna.)
Azerbaijan – Republic of Azerbaijan; Capital: Baku	Widely recognized UN member state. Azerbaijan had one autonomous republic, Nakhchivan. It included the disputed region of Nagorno-Karabakh, where a partially recognized breakaway republic had declared independence.
=== B ===
The Bahamas – Commonwealth of the Bahamas; Capital: Nassau	Widely recognized UN member state; Commonwealth realm.
→ Bahrain; Capital: Manama: State of Bahrain (to 14 February 2002) (Note: Bahrain enacted a new constitution on 14 February 2002. Hamad ibn Isa Al Khalifah, the Emir of Bahrain, was declared a King.); Kingdom of Bahrain (from 14 February 2002)	Widely recognized UN member state.
Bangladesh – People's Republic of Bangladesh; Capital: Dhaka	Widely recognized UN member state.
Barbados; Capital: Bridgetown	Widely recognized UN member state; Commonwealth realm.
Belarus – Republic of Belarus; Capital: Minsk	Widely recognized UN member state.
Belgium – Kingdom of Belgium; Capital: Brussels	Widely recognized UN member state; EU member. Belgium was a federation of three communities and three regions. (Note: 3 communities: Flemish Community, French Community, German-speaking Community. 3 Regions: Brussels-Capital Region, Flanders, Wallonia.)
Belize; Capital: Belmopan	Widely recognized UN member state; Commonwealth realm.
Benin – Republic of Benin; Capital: Porto-Novo (official), Cotonou (seat of government)	Widely recognized UN member state.
Bhutan – Kingdom of Bhutan; Capital: Thimphu	Widely recognized UN member state. Bhutan was officially guided by India in its foreign affairs, but effectively pursued an independent foreign policy. The Indo-Bhutanese Friendship Treaty was revised on 8 February 2007, confirming Bhutan's full independence in this area.
Bolivia; Capital: Sucre (official), La Paz (administrative): Republic of Bolivia (to 7 February 2009); Plurinational State of Bolivia (from 7 February 2009)	Widely recognized UN member state.
Bosnia and Herzegovina; Capital: Sarajevo	Widely recognized UN member state. Bosnia and Herzegovina was a federation of two constituent entities: the Federation of Bosnia and Herzegovina, which was itself a federation of ten cantons, (Note: 10 cantons: Bosnian-Podrinje, Canton 10, Central Bosnia, Herzegovina-Neretva, Posavina, Sarajevo, Tuzla, Una-Sana, West Herzegovina, Zenica-Doboj.) and Republika Srpska. There was also a neutral Brčko District.
Botswana – Republic of Botswana; Capital: Gaborone	Widely recognized UN member state.
Brazil – Federative Republic of Brazil; Capital: Brasília	Widely recognized UN member state. Brazil was a federation of 26 states and one federal district. (Note: 26 states: Acre, Alagoas, Amapá, Amazonas, Bahia, Ceará, Espírito Santo, Goiás, Maranhão, Mato Grosso, Mato Grosso do Sul, Minas Gerais, Pará, Paraíba, Paraná, Pernambuco, Piauí, Rio Grande do Norte, Rio Grande do Sul, Rio de Janeiro, Rondônia, Roraima, Santa Catarina, São Paulo, Sergipe, Tocantins. 1 federal district: Federal District.)
Brunei – State of Brunei, Abode of Peace; Capital: Bandar Seri Begawan	Widely recognized UN member state. Brunei claimed part of the Spratly Islands (disputed by China, Taiwan, Vietnam, the Philippines, and Malaysia).
Bulgaria – Republic of Bulgaria; Capital: Sofia	Widely recognized UN member state; EU member (from 1 January 2007).
Burkina Faso; Capital: Ouagadougou	Widely recognized UN member state.
Burma → Myanmar
Burundi – Republic of Burundi; Capital: Bujumbura	Widely recognized UN member state.
=== C ===
Cambodia – Kingdom of Cambodia; Capital: Phnom Penh	Widely recognized UN member state.
Cameroon – Republic of Cameroon; Capital: Yaoundé	Widely recognized UN member state.
Canada; Capital: Ottawa	Widely recognized UN member state and Commonwealth realm; Canada was a federation of ten provinces and three territories. (Note: 10 provinces: Alberta, British Columbia, Manitoba, New Brunswick, Newfoundland (renamed Newfoundland and Labrador on 6 December 2001), Nova Scotia, Ontario, Prince Edward Island, Quebec, Saskatchewan. 3 territories: Northwest Territories, Nunavut, Yukon.)
Cape Verde – Republic of Cape Verde; Capital: Praia	Widely recognized UN member state.
Central African Republic; Capital: Bangui	Widely recognized UN member state.
Chad – Republic of Chad; Capital: N'Djamena	Widely recognized UN member state.
Chile – Republic of Chile; Capital: Santiago	Widely recognized UN member state. Chile had two special territories after 30 July 2007, Easter Island and the Juan Fernández Islands. It had a claim over Chilean Antarctic Territory, which is suspended under the Antarctic Treaty.
China – People's Republic of China; Capital: Beijing	Widely recognized UN member state. China had five autonomous regions: Guangxi, Inner Mongolia, Ningxia, Xinjiang and Tibet. Additionally, it had sovereignty over two special administrative regions: Hong Kong; Macau; China claimed Taiwan, Kinmen, the Matsu Islands, Pratas Island and the Vereker Banks, and Itu Aba, all of which were governed by Taiwan. It also claimed the Paracel Islands (disputed by the Republic of China and Vietnam), the Spratly Islands (disputed by the Republic of China, Vietnam, the Philippines, Malaysia and Brunei), and South Tibet (controlled by India). The People's Republic of China administered Aksai Chin and the Trans-Karakoram Tract, which were within the disputed region of Kashmir.
Colombia – Republic of Colombia; Capital: Bogotá	Widely recognized UN member state. Colombia administered Serranilla Bank and claimed Bajo Nuevo Bank (disputed by Nicaragua and the United States)
→ Comoros; Capital: Moroni: Federal Islamic Republic of the Comoros (to 23 December 2001); Union of the Comoros (from 23 December 2001)	Widely recognized UN member state. The Comoros was a federation of three islands (autonomous islands since 23 December 2001): Grande Comore, Mohéli, and Anjouan. Anjouan and Mohéli were de facto independent states until 10 March 2002. Comoros also claimed sovereignty over the French overseas territories of Mayotte and the Glorioso Islands. Comoros also claimed Banc du Geyser (disputed by Madagascar and France).
(Democratic Republic of the Congo) → → Congo, Democratic Republic of the – Democratic Republic of the Congo; Capital: Kinshasa	Widely recognized UN member state.
Congo, Republic of the – Republic of the Congo; Capital: Brazzaville	Widely recognized UN member state.
Costa Rica – Republic of Costa Rica; Capital: San José	Widely recognized UN member state.
Côte d'Ivoire → Ivory Coast
Croatia – Republic of Croatia; Capital: Zagreb	Widely recognized UN member state.
Cuba – Republic of Cuba; Capital: Havana	Widely recognized UN member state. The Cuban area of Guantánamo Bay was under the control of the United States.
→ Cyprus – Republic of Cyprus; Capital: Nicosia	Widely recognized UN member state. (Note: Was not recognized by Turkey or Northern Cyprus.) EU member (from 1 May 2004). The northeastern part of the island was the de facto independent state of Northern Cyprus, recognized only by Turkey.
Czech Republic; Capital: Prague	Widely recognized UN member state. EU member (from 1 May 2004).
=== D ===
Denmark – Kingdom of Denmark; Capital: Copenhagen	Widely recognized UN member state; EU member. The Danish Realm also included two of its constituent countries: Greenland; Faroe Islands
Djibouti – Republic of Djibouti; Capital: Djibouti	Widely recognized UN member state.
Dominica – Commonwealth of Dominica; Capital: Roseau	Widely recognized UN member state.
Dominican Republic; Capital: Santo Domingo	Widely recognized UN member state.
=== E ===
East Timor (Note: Also known as "Timor-Leste".) (from 20 May 2002); Capital: Dili: Democratic Republic of East Timor (from 20 May 2002 to 27 September 2002); Democratic Republic of Timor-Leste (from 27 September 2002)	Widely recognized independent state; UN member state (from 27 September 2002).
→ Ecuador – Republic of Ecuador; Capital: Quito	Widely recognized UN member state.
Egypt – Arab Republic of Egypt; Capital: Cairo	Widely recognized UN member state.
El Salvador – Republic of El Salvador; Capital: San Salvador	Widely recognized UN member state.
Equatorial Guinea – Republic of Equatorial Guinea; Capital: Malabo	Widely recognized UN member state.
Eritrea – State of Eritrea; Capital: Asmara	Widely recognized UN member state.
Estonia – Republic of Estonia; Capital: Tallinn	Widely recognized UN member state; EU member (from 1 May 2004).
→ Ethiopia – Federal Democratic Republic of Ethiopia; Capital: Addis Ababa	Widely recognized UN member state; Ethiopia was a federation of nine regions and two chartered cities. (Note: 9 regions: Afar, Amhara, Benishangul-Gumuz, Gambela, Harari, Oromiya, Somali, Southern Nations, Nationalities, and Peoples Region, Tigray. 2 chartered cities: Addis Ababa, Dire Dawa.)
=== F ===
Fiji – Republic of the Fiji Islands; Capital: Suva	Widely recognized UN member state. Fiji had an autonomous dependency, Rotuma.
Finland – Republic of Finland; Capital: Helsinki	Widely recognized UN member state. EU member. Finland had a neutral and demilitarised region: Åland
France – French Republic; Capital: Paris	Widely recognized UN member state. EU member. France included four overseas departments: French Guiana, Guadeloupe, Martinique and Réunion. It also had sovereignty over the following overseas territories: Clipperton Island (from 22 February 2007); French Polynesia, with one dependency; Clipperton Island (to 22 February 2007); French Southern and Antarctic Lands (including a claim to Adélie Land which was suspended under the Antarctic Treaty.); Mayotte; New Caledonia; Saint-Barthélemy (from 21 February 2007); Saint Martin (from 21 February 2007); Saint Pierre and Miquelon; The Scattered Islands in the Indian Ocean, consisting of five uninhabited possessions, all of which were incorporated into the French Southern and Antarctic Lands on 21 February 2007: Bassas da India (disputed by Madagascar); Europa Island (disputed by Madagascar); Glorioso Islands (disputed by Madagascar, Comoros, and the Seychelles); Juan de Nova Island (disputed by Madagascar); Tromelin Island (disputed by Mauritius and the Seychelles); Wallis and Futuna; France also claimed Banc du Geyser (disputed by Madagascar and the Comoros).
=== G ===
Gabon – Gabonese Republic; Capital: Libreville	Widely recognized UN member state.
The Gambia – Republic of the Gambia; Capital: Banjul	Widely recognized UN member state.
→ Georgia; Capital: Tbilisi	Widely recognized UN member state. Georgia had two autonomous republics: Adjara and Abkhazia. The latter republic was home to a de facto independent state. Georgia also included the disputed region of South Ossetia, where a partially recognized breakaway republic had declared independence.
Germany – Federal Republic of Germany; Capital: Berlin	Widely recognized UN member state; EU member. Germany was a federation of sixteen states. (Note: 16 states: Baden-Württemberg, Bavaria, Berlin, Brandenburg, Bremen, Hamburg, Hesse, Lower Saxony, Mecklenburg-Vorpommern, North Rhine-Westphalia, Rhineland-Palatinate, Saarland, Saxony, Saxony-Anhalt, Schleswig-Holstein, Thuringia)
Ghana – Republic of Ghana; Capital: Accra	Widely recognized UN member state.
Greece – Hellenic Republic; Capital: Athens	Widely recognized UN member state; EU member. Greece had sovereignty over Mount Athos, an autonomous monastic state that was jointly governed by the multi-national "Holy Community" on the mountain and the Civil Governor appointed by the Greek Ministry of Foreign Affairs, and spiritually came under the direct jurisdiction of the Ecumenical Patriarchate.
Grenada; Capital: St. George's	Widely recognized UN member state; Commonwealth realm. Grenada had one autonomous dependency, Carriacou and Petite Martinique.
Guatemala – Republic of Guatemala; Capital: Guatemala City	Widely recognized UN member state.
Guinea – Republic of Guinea; Capital: Conakry	Widely recognized UN member state.
Guinea-Bissau – Republic of Guinea-Bissau; Capital: Bissau	Widely recognized UN member state.
Guyana – Co-operative Republic of Guyana; Capital: Georgetown	Widely recognized UN member state.
=== H ===
Haiti – Republic of Haiti; Capital: Port-au-Prince	Widely recognized UN member state. Haiti claimed the uninhabited United States possession of Navassa Island.
Holy See → Vatican City
Honduras – Republic of Honduras; Capital: Tegucigalpa	Widely recognized UN member state.
Hungary – Republic of Hungary; Capital: Budapest	Widely recognized UN member state; EU member (from 1 May 2004).
=== I ===
Iceland – Republic of Iceland; Capital: Reykjavík	Widely recognized UN member state.
India – Republic of India; Capital: New Delhi	Widely recognized UN member state. India was a federation of twenty-eight states and seven union territories. (Note: 28 states: Andhra Pradesh, Arunachal Pradesh, Assam, Bihar, Chhattisgarh (from 1 November 2000), Goa, Gujarat, Haryana, Himachal Pradesh, Jammu and Kashmir, Jharkhand (from 15 November 2000), Karnataka, Kerala, Madhya Pradesh, Maharashtra, Manipur, Meghalaya, Mizoram, Nagaland, Orissa, Punjab, Rajasthan, Sikkim, Tamil Nadu, Tripura, Uttar Pradesh, Uttaranchal (from 9 November 2000, renamed Uttarakhand in 2007), West Bengal. 7 union territories: Andaman and Nicobar Islands, Chandigarh, Dadra and Nagar Haveli, Daman and Diu, Lakshadweep, National Capital Territory of Delhi, Pondicherry (spelled Puducherry from 2006).) Indian sovereignty over South Tibet was disputed by the People's Republic of China. India administered part of the disputed region of Kashmir as the state of Jammu and Kashmir.
Indonesia – Republic of Indonesia; Capital: Jakarta	Widely recognized UN member state. Indonesia had five special provinces: Aceh, Jakarta, Papua (from 21 November 2001), West Papua (from 14 November 2003), and Yogyakarta
Iran – Islamic Republic of Iran; Capital: Tehran	Widely recognized UN member state.
→ → Iraq (Note: Iraq was administered from 21 April 2003 to 28 June 2004 by the United States, the United Kingdom, and other member states of the Multinational force in Iraq.); Capital: Baghdad: Republic of Iraq (to 21 April 2003); Coalition Provisional Authority (from 21 April 2003 to 28 June 2004); Republic of Iraq (from 28 June 2004)	Widely recognized UN member state. After 15 October 2005, Iraq was constitutionally designated as a federation of autonomous regions, but only one region (i.e. Iraqi Kurdistan) had been established.
Ireland (Note: Ireland also had the legal description of "Republic of Ireland", although this was not its constitutional name.); Capital: Dublin	Widely recognized UN member state; EU member.
Israel – State of Israel; Capital: Jerusalem	Widely recognized UN member state. (Note: Israel was not recognized by Afghanistan, Algeria, Bahrain, Bangladesh, Chad, Cuba, Indonesia, Iran, Iraq, Kuwait, Lebanon, Libya, Malaysia, North Korea, Pakistan, Saudi Arabia, Sudan, Syria, the United Arab Emirates, or Yemen.) Israel occupied East Jerusalem, the Gaza Strip, the Golan Heights, the Israeli Security Zone in Southern Lebanon (to 22 May 2000), and the West Bank. These areas were not generally recognized as being part of Israel.
→ → Italy – Italian Republic; Capital: Rome	Widely recognized UN member state; EEC member. Italy had 5 autonomous regions and they were the Aosta Valley, Friuli-Venezia Giulia, Sardinia, Sicily, and Trentino-Alto Adige/Südtirol.
Ivory Coast – Republic of Côte d'Ivoire; Capital: Yamoussoukro (official), Abidjan (seat of government)	Widely recognized UN member state.
=== J ===
Jamaica; Capital: Kingston	Widely recognized UN member state; Commonwealth realm.
Japan; Capital: Tokyo	Widely recognized UN member state. Japan claimed the Liancourt Rocks, which were controlled by South Korea.
Jordan – Hashemite Kingdom of Jordan; Capital: Amman	Widely recognized UN member state.
=== K ===
Kazakhstan – Republic of Kazakhstan; Capital: Astana	Widely recognized UN member state.
Kenya – Republic of Kenya; Capital: Nairobi	Widely recognized UN member state.
Kiribati – Republic of Kiribati; Capital: South Tarawa	Widely recognized UN member state.
Korea, North – Democratic People's Republic of Korea; Capital: Pyongyang	Widely recognized UN member state. (Note: North Korea was not recognized by Estonia, France, Japan, or South Korea.) Claimed to be the sole legitimate government of Korea.
Korea, South – Republic of Korea; Capital: Seoul	Widely recognized UN member state. (Note: South Korea was not recognized by North Korea.) South Korea had one autonomous region and it was Jeju Island from 1 July 2006; claimed to be the sole legitimate government of Korea. South Korea controlled the Liancourt Rocks, which were claimed by Japan.
Kuwait – State of Kuwait; Capital: Kuwait City	Widely recognized UN member state.
Kyrgyzstan – Kyrgyz Republic; Capital: Bishkek	Widely recognized UN member state.
=== L ===
Laos – Lao People's Democratic Republic; Capital: Vientiane	Widely recognized UN member state.
Latvia – Republic of Latvia; Capital: Riga	Widely recognized UN member state; EU member (from 1 May 2004).
Lebanon – Lebanese Republic; Capital: Beirut	Widely recognized UN member state. Lebanon was occupied by Syria (to 25 April 2005). Some of Southern Lebanon was occupied by Israel (to 22 May 2000).
→ Lesotho – Kingdom of Lesotho; Capital: Maseru	Widely recognized UN member state.
Liberia – Republic of Liberia; Capital: Monrovia	Widely recognized UN member state.
Libya – Great Socialist People's Libyan Arab Jamahiriya; Capital: Tripoli	Widely recognized UN member state.
Liechtenstein – Principality of Liechtenstein; Capital: Vaduz	Widely recognized UN member state. The defense of Liechtenstein was the responsibility of Switzerland.
→ Lithuania – Republic of Lithuania; Capital: Vilnius	Widely recognized UN member state; EU member (from 1 May 2004).
Luxembourg – Grand Duchy of Luxembourg; Capital: Luxembourg	Widely recognized UN member state; EU member.
=== M ===
Macedonia – Republic of Macedonia (Note: Provisionally referred to by the UN and a number of states and international organizations as "the former Yugoslav Republic of Macedonia", see Macedonia naming dispute.); Capital: Skopje	Widely recognized UN member state.
Madagascar – Republic of Madagascar; Capital: Antananarivo	Widely recognized UN member state. Madagascar claimed the French possessions of Bassas da India, Europa Island, Glorioso Islands and Juan de Nova Island. It also claimed Banc du Geyser (disputed by Comoros and France)
Malawi – Republic of Malawi; Capital: Lilongwe	Widely recognized UN member state.
Malaysia; Capital: Kuala Lumpur (official), Putrajaya (administrative)	Widely recognized UN member state. Malaysia was a federation of thirteen states and three federal territories. (Note: 13 states: Johor, Kedah, Kelantan, Malacca, Negeri Sembilan, Pahang, Perak, Perlis, Penang, Sabah, Sarawak, Selangor, Terengganu. 3 federal territories: Kuala Lumpur, Labuan, Putrajaya (from 1 February 2001).) Malaysia claimed part of the Spratly Islands (disputed by the People's Republic of China, the Republic of China, Vietnam, the Philippines, and Brunei).
Maldives – Republic of Maldives; Capital: Malé	Widely recognized UN member state.
Mali – Republic of Mali; Capital: Bamako	Widely recognized UN member state.
Malta – Republic of Malta; Capital: Valletta	Widely recognized UN member state; EU member (from 1 May 2004).
Marshall Islands – Republic of the Marshall Islands; Capital: Majuro	Widely recognized UN member state under Compact of Free Association with the United States. The Marshall Islands claimed the United States territory of Wake Island.
Mauritania – Islamic Republic of Mauritania; Capital: Nouakchott	Widely recognized UN member state.
Mauritius – Republic of Mauritius; Capital: Port Louis	Widely recognized UN member state. Mauritius had one autonomous dependency: Rodrigues (from 12 October 2002). Mauritius also had three (later two) other dependencies: Agalega Islands, Cargados Carajos and Rodrigues (to 12 October 2002). It claimed the British Indian Ocean Territory and the French territory of Tromelin Island.
Mexico – United Mexican States; Capital: Mexico City	Widely recognized UN member state. Mexico was a federation of 31 states and one federal district. (Note: 31 states: Aguascalientes, Baja California, Baja California Sur, Campeche, Chiapas, Chihuahua, Coahuila, Colima, Durango, Guanajuato, Guerrero, Hidalgo, Jalisco, México, Michoacán, Morelos, Nayarit, Nuevo León, Oaxaca, Puebla, Querétaro, Quintana Roo, San Luis Potosí, Sinaloa, Sonora, Tabasco, Tamaulipas, Tlaxcala, Veracruz, Yucatán, Zacatecas. 1 federal district: Federal District.)
Micronesia – Federated States of Micronesia; Capital: Palikir	Widely recognized UN member state under Compact of Free Association with the United States; the FSM was a federation of four states. (Note: 4 states: Chuuk, Kosrae, Pohnpei, Yap.)
Moldova – Republic of Moldova; Capital: Chişinău	Widely recognized UN member state. Moldova had two autonomous territorial units: Gagauzia and Transnistria. The latter was home to a de facto independent state.
Monaco – Principality of Monaco; Capital: Monaco	Widely recognized UN member state. The defense of Monaco was the responsibility of France.
Mongolia; Capital: Ulaanbaatar	Widely recognized UN member state.
Montenegro (from 3 June 2006); Capital: Podgorica: Republic of Montenegro (from 3 June 2006 to 22 October 2007) (Note: Montenegro declared independence from Serbia and Montenegro on 3 June 2006.) (Note: The Republic of Montenegro adopted a new constitution on 22 October 2007, shortening its official name to "Montenegro".); Montenegro (from 22 October 2007)	Widely recognized independent state from 3 June 2006; UN member state from 28 June 2006.
Morocco – Kingdom of Morocco; Capital: Rabat	Widely recognized UN member state. Morocco claimed sovereignty over and controlled most of the disputed Western Sahara, which was home to the de facto independent Sahrawi Arab Democratic Republic. Morocco disputed the Spanish sovereignty over Ceuta, Isla de Alborán, Isla Perejil, Islas Chafarinas, Melilla, and Peñón de Alhucemas.
Mozambique – Republic of Mozambique; Capital: Maputo	Widely recognized UN member state.
Myanmar – Union of Myanmar (Note: Commonly known in English as "Burma".); Capital: Yangon (to 6 November 2005), Naypyidaw (from 6 November 2005)	Widely recognized UN member state.
=== N ===
Namibia – Republic of Namibia; Capital: Windhoek	Widely recognized UN member state.
Nauru – Republic of Nauru; Capital: Yaren (unofficial)	Widely recognized UN member state. The defense of Nauru was the responsibility of Australia.
Nepal; Capital: Kathmandu: Kingdom of Nepal (to 15 January 2007); State of Nepal (from 15 January 2007 to 28 May 2008); Federal Democratic Republic of Nepal (from 28 May 2008)	Widely recognized UN member state. Nepal was designated as a federation after 28 May 2008, but its federal units had not yet been created.
Netherlands – Kingdom of the Netherlands; Capital: Amsterdam (official), The Hague (seat of government)	Widely recognized UN member state. The Kingdom of the Netherlands consisted of three autonomous countries: Aruba; Netherlands; Netherlands Antilles; The Kingdom of the Netherlands as a whole was a member of the EU, but Aruba and the Netherlands Antilles were not.
New Zealand; Capital: Wellington	Widely recognized UN member state; Commonwealth realm. New Zealand had responsibilities for the two free associated states of: Cook Islands; Niue; It also had sovereignty over two dependent territories: Ross Dependency (suspended under the Antarctic Treaty); Tokelau; The government of Tokelau claimed Swains Island, part of American Samoa (a U.S. dependence). New Zealand did not recognize this claim.
Nicaragua – Republic of Nicaragua; Capital: Managua	Widely recognized UN member state. Nicaragua had two autonomous regions: Región Autónoma del Atlántico Norte and Región Autónoma del Atlántico Sur.
Niger – Republic of Niger; Capital: Niamey	Widely recognized UN member state.
Nigeria – Federal Republic of Nigeria; Capital: Abuja	Widely recognized UN member state. Nigeria was a federation of 36 states and one federal territory. (Note: 36 states: Abia, Adamawa, Akwa Ibom, Anambra, Bauchi, Bayelsa, Benue, Borno, Cross River, Delta, Ebonyi, Edo, Ekiti, Enugu, Gombe, Imo, Jigawa, Kaduna, Kano, Katsina, Kebbi, Kogi, Kwara, Lagos, Nasarawa, Niger, Ogun, Ondo, Osun, Oyo, Plateau, Rivers, Sokoto, Taraba, Yobe, Zamfara. 1 federal territory: Federal Capital Territory.)
Norway – Kingdom of Norway; Capital: Oslo	Widely recognized UN member state. Norway had two integral overseas areas: Jan Mayen and Svalbard. The latter of area had a special status due to the Spitsbergen Treaty. Norway had sovereignty over the following dependencies: Bouvet Island; Peter I Island (suspended under the Antarctic Treaty); Queen Maud Land (suspended under the Antarctic Treaty)
=== O ===
Oman – Sultanate of Oman; Capital: Muscat	Widely recognized UN member state.
=== P ===
Pakistan – Islamic Republic of Pakistan; Capital: Islamabad	Widely recognized UN member state. Pakistan was a federation of four provinces and four territories. (Note: 4 provinces: Balochistan, North-West Frontier Province, Punjab, Sindh. 4 territories: Azad Kashmir, Federally Administered Tribal Areas, Islamabad Capital Territory, Northern Areas (renamed Gilgit-Baltistan on 29 August 2009).) It administered part of the disputed region of Kashmir as the territories of Azad Kashmir and the Northern Areas. The latter territory was autonomous under the name Gilgit-Baltistan after 29 August 2009.
Palau – Republic of Palau; Capital: Koror (to 7 October 2006), Ngerulmud (from 7 October 2006)	Widely recognized UN member state under Compact of Free Association with the United States.
Panama – Republic of Panama; Capital: Panama City	Widely recognized UN member state.
Papua New Guinea – Independent State of Papua New Guinea; Capital: Port Moresby	Widely recognized UN member state; Commonwealth realm. After 15 June 2005, Papua New Guinea had one autonomous region: Bougainville.
Paraguay – Republic of Paraguay; Capital: Asunción	Widely recognized UN member state.
Peru; Capital: Lima: Republic of Peru (to November 22, 2000); Republic of Peru (from November 22, 2000)	Widely recognized UN member state.
Philippines – Republic of the Philippines; Capital: Manila	Widely recognized UN member state. The Philippines had one autonomous region: Muslim Mindanao. The Philippines administered Scarborough Shoal and Macclesfield Bank, disputed by the People's Republic of China and the Republic of China. It also claimed sovereignty over the Spratly Islands (disputed by the People's Republic of China, the Republic of China, Vietnam, Brunei, and Malaysia) and the Malaysian territory of Sabah.
Poland – Republic of Poland; Capital: Warsaw	Widely recognized UN member state; EU member (from 1 May 2004).
Portugal – Portuguese Republic; Capital: Lisbon	Widely recognized UN member state; EU member. Portugal had two autonomous regions: the Azores and Madeira. Portugal claimed the Spanish municipalities of Olivenza and Táliga.
=== Q ===
Qatar – State of Qatar; Capital: Doha	Widely recognized UN member state.
=== R ===
Romania; Capital: Bucharest	Widely recognized UN member state; EU member (from 1 January 2007).
Russia – Russian Federation; Capital: Moscow	Widely recognized UN member state. Russia was a federation of 21 republics, 49 oblasts, 9 krais, 2 federal cities, 1 autonomous oblast, and 10 autonomous okrugs. (Note: 21 republics: Adygea, Altai, Bashkortostan, Buryatia, Chechnya, Chuvash Republic, Dagestan, Ingushetia, Kabardino-Balkaria, Kalmykia, Karachay–Cherkessia, Karelia, Khakassia, Komi, Mari El, Mordovia, North Ossetia–Alania, Sakha, Tatarstan, Tuva, Udmurtia. 49 oblasts: Amur, Arkhangelsk, Astrakhan, Belgorod, Bryansk, Chelyabinsk, Chita (to 1 March 2008), Irkutsk, Ivanovo, Kaliningrad, Kaluga, Kamchatka (to 1 July 2007), Kemerovo, Kirov, Kostroma, Kurgan, Kursk, Leningrad, Lipetsk, Magadan, Moscow, Murmansk, Nizhny Novgorod, Novgorod, Novosibirsk, Omsk, Orenburg, Oryol, Penza, Perm (to 1 December 2005), Pskov, Rostov, Ryazan, Sakhalin, Samara, Saratov, Smolensk, Sverdlovsk, Tambov, Tomsk, Tula, Tver, Tyumen, Ulyanovsk, Vladimir, Volgograd, Vologda, Voronezh, Yaroslavl. 9 krais: Altai, Kamchatka (from 1 July 2007), Khabarovsk, Krasnodar, Krasnoyarsk, Perm (from 1 December 2005), Primorsky, Stavropol, Zabaykalsky (from 1 March 2008). 2 federal cities: Moscow, St. Petersburg. 1 autonomous oblast: Jewish Autonomous Oblast. 10 autonomous okrugs: Agin-Buryatia (to 1 March 2008), Chukotka, Evenkia (to 1 January 2007), Khanty–Mansi, Koryakia (to 1 July 2007), Nenetsia, Permyakia (to 1 December 2005), Taymyria (to 1 January 2007), Ust-Orda Buryatia (to 1 January 2008), Yamalia.)
→ Rwanda; Capital: Kigali: Rwandese Republic (to 26 May 2003) (Note: On 26 May 2003, Rwanda adopted a new constitution, changing its official French name from "République rwandaise" to "République du Rwanda". The former name can be translated into English as "Rwandese Republic", "Rwandan Republic", or "Republic of Rwanda". The official name in Kinyarwanda has always been "Republika y'u Rwanda".); Republic of Rwanda (from 26 May 2003)	Widely recognized UN member state.
=== S ===
Saint Kitts and Nevis – Federation of Saint Kitts and Nevis; Capital: Basseterre	Widely recognized UN member state; Commonwealth realm. Saint Kitts and Nevis was a federation of fourteen parishes within two islands. (Note: 2 islands: Saint Kitts, Nevis. 14 parishes: Christ Church Nichola Town (Saint Kitts), Saint Anne Sandy Point (Saint Kitts), Saint George Basseterre (Saint Kitts), Saint George Gingerland (Nevis), Saint James Windward (Nevis), Saint John Capesterre (Saint Kitts), Saint John Figtree (Nevis), Saint Mary Cayon (Saint Kitts), Saint Paul Capisterre (Saint Kitts), Saint Paul Charlestown (Nevis), Saint Peter Basseterre (Saint Kitts), Saint Thomas Lowland (Nevis), Saint Thomas Middle Island (Saint Kitts), Trinity Palmetto Point (Saint Kitts)) Nevis (which was one of the islands) had autonomy.
→ Saint Lucia; Capital: Castries	Widely recognized UN member state; Commonwealth realm.
Saint Vincent and the Grenadines; Capital: Kingstown	Widely recognized UN member state; Commonwealth realm.
Samoa – Independent State of Samoa; Capital: Apia	Widely recognized UN member state.
San Marino – Republic of San Marino; Capital: San Marino	Widely recognized UN member state.
São Tomé and Príncipe – Democratic Republic of São Tomé and Príncipe; Capital: São Tomé	Widely recognized UN member state. São Tomé and Príncipe had one autonomous province: Príncipe.
Saudi Arabia – Kingdom of Saudi Arabia; Capital: Riyadh	Widely recognized UN member state.
Senegal – Republic of Senegal; Capital: Dakar	Widely recognized UN member state.
Serbia – Republic of Serbia (from 5 June 2006) (Note: The Serbian parliament declared independence from Serbia and Montenegro on 5 June 2006, ending the union.); Capital: Belgrade	Widely recognized UN member state from 5 June 2006. Serbia had two autonomous provinces: Vojvodina and Kosovo and Metohija. The latter province was governed by the United Nations Interim Administration Mission in Kosovo. After 17 February 2008, it was home to a partially recognized de facto independent state.
Serbia and Montenegro (to 5 June 2006); Capital: Belgrade (administrative/legislative), Podgorica (judicial, from 4 February 2003 to 3 June 2006): Federal Republic of Yugoslavia (to 4 February 2003) (Note: The Federal Republic of Yugoslavia reconstituted itself as Serbia and Montenegro on 4 February 2003.); State Union of Serbia and Montenegro (from 4 February 2003 to 5 June 2006)	Widely recognized independent state; UN member state from 1 November 2000. Serbia and Montenegro was a federation of two republics, Montenegro and Serbia, until 3 June 2006 after which it only consisted of the latter. It also included two autonomous provinces within Serbia, Vojvodina and Kosovo and Metohija. The latter province was under the administration of the United Nations Interim Administration Mission in Kosovo.
Seychelles – Republic of Seychelles; Capital: Victoria	Widely recognized UN member state. The Seychelles claimed the British Indian Ocean Territory and the French territories of Tromelin Island and the Glorioso Islands.
Sierra Leone – Republic of Sierra Leone; Capital: Freetown	Widely recognized UN member state.
Singapore – Republic of Singapore; Capital: Singapore	Widely recognized UN member state.
Slovakia – Slovak Republic; Capital: Bratislava	Widely recognized UN member state; EU member (from 1 May 2004).
Slovenia – Republic of Slovenia; Capital: Ljubljana	Widely recognized UN member state; EU member (from 1 May 2004).
Solomon Islands; Capital: Honiara	Widely recognized UN member state; Commonwealth realm.
Somalia; Capital: Mogadishu: Somalia (to 16 July 2000) (Note: The Transitional National Government of Somalia adopted a Federal Charter on 16 July 2000.); Somali Republic (from 16 July 2000)	Widely recognized UN member state. Somalia did not have a recognized central government until April 2000, when the Transitional National Government (after November 2004, the Transitional Federal Government) was established. Over the course of the Somali Civil War, several autonomous regional governments were established in the de jure territory of Somalia. Although these states did not claim independence from Somalia, they were de facto self-governing: Ahlu Sunna Waljama'a (from 2009); al-Shabaab (from 19 January 2007); (Somalia) Galmudug (from 14 August 2006); (Somalia) Himan and Heeb (from June 2008); Hizbul Islam (from January 2009); Islamic Courts Union (from 6 June 2006 to 1 January 2007); → Maakhir (from 1 July 2007 to 11 January 2009); (Somalia) → Puntland (from 1 July 2001); Southwestern Somalia (from 1 April 2002 to 10 February 2006); There were also areas of the country which at various times had no effective government at all or which were ruled by local clans. In addition, there were two states which had declared and established de facto independence from Somalia: Puntland (to 1 July 2001) and Somaliland.
South Africa – Republic of South Africa; Capital: Pretoria (administrative), Cape Town (legislative), Bloemfontein (judicial)	Widely recognized UN member state.
Spain – Kingdom of Spain; Capital: Madrid	Widely recognized UN member state; EU member. Spain was divided into seventeen autonomous communities and two autonomous cities. (Note: 17 autonomous communities: Andalusia, Aragon, Asturias, Balearic Islands, Basque Country, Canary Islands, Cantabria, Castile-La Mancha, Castile and León, Catalonia, Extremadura, Galicia, Madrid, Murcia, Navarre, La Rioja, Valencian Community. 2 autonomous cities: Ceuta, Melilla.) Its sovereignty over Ceuta, Isla de Alborán, Isla Perejil, Islas Chafarinas, Melilla and Peñón de Alhucemas was disputed by Morocco. Its sovereignty over Olivenza and Táliga was disputed by Portugal. It claimed the British overseas territory of Gibraltar.
Sri Lanka – Democratic Socialist Republic of Sri Lanka; Capital: Sri Jayawardenapura-Kotte	Widely recognized UN member state.
Sudan – Republic of the Sudan; Capital: Khartoum	Widely recognized UN member state. Sudan was a federation of 26 states, ten of which formed the autonomous region of Southern Sudan after 9 January 2005. (Note: 26 states: Blue Nile, Central Equatoria, Eastern Equatoria, Al Jazirah, Jonglei, Kassala, Khartoum, Lakes, Northern Bahr el Ghazal, North Darfur, North Kurdufan, Northern, Al Qadarif, Red Sea, River Nile, Sennar, South Darfur, South Kurdufan, Unity, Upper Nile, Western Equatoria, Western Bahr el Ghazal, West Darfur, West Kurdufan (to 16 August 2005), White Nile, Warrap.)
Suriname – Republic of Suriname; Capital: Paramaribo	Widely recognized UN member state.
Swaziland – Kingdom of Swaziland; Capital: Mbabane (administrative), Lobamba (royal and legislative)	Widely recognized UN member state.
Sweden – Kingdom of Sweden; Capital: Stockholm	Widely recognized UN member state; EU member.
Switzerland – Swiss Confederation; Capital: Bern	Widely recognized independent state. Permanent observer at the UN (to 10 September 2002). UN member state (from 10 September 2002). Switzerland was a federation of 26 cantons. (Note: 26 Cantons: Aargau, Appenzell Ausserrhoden, Appenzell Innerrhoden, Basel-Stadt, Basel-Landschaft, Bern, Fribourg, Geneva, Glarus, Graubünden, Jura, Lucerne, Neuchâtel, Nidwalden, Obwalden, Schaffhausen, Schwyz, Solothurn, St. Gallen, Thurgau, Ticino, Uri, Valais, Vaud, Zug, Zürich.)
Syria – Syrian Arab Republic; Capital: Damascus	Widely recognized UN member state. Syria included the Golan Heights, which were occupied by Israel. It disputed the Turkish sovereignty over Hatay Province.
=== T ===
Tajikistan – Republic of Tajikistan; Capital: Dushanbe	Widely recognized UN member state. Tajikistan had one autonomous province: Gorno-Badakhshan.
Tanzania – United Republic of Tanzania; Capital: Dodoma (official), Dar es Salaam (seat of government)	Widely recognized UN member state. Tanzania had one autonomous region: Zanzibar.
Thailand – Kingdom of Thailand; Capital: Bangkok	Widely recognized UN member state.
Timor-Leste → East Timor
Togo; Capital: Lomé	Widely recognized UN member state.
Tonga – Kingdom of Tonga; Capital: Nukuʻalofa	Widely recognized UN member state.
Trinidad and Tobago – Republic of Trinidad and Tobago; Capital: Port of Spain	Widely recognized UN member state. Trinidad and Tobago had one autonomous island: Tobago.
Tunisia – Tunisian Republic; Capital: Tunis	Widely recognized UN member state.
Turkey – Republic of Turkey; Capital: Ankara	Widely recognized UN member state.
→ Turkmenistan; Capital: Ashgabat	Widely recognized UN member state.
Tuvalu; Capital: Funafuti	Widely recognized independent state and UN member state from 5 September 2000; Commonwealth realm.
=== U ===
Uganda – Republic of Uganda; Capital: Kampala	Widely recognized UN member state.
→ Ukraine; Capital: Kiev	Widely recognized UN member state; Ukraine had one autonomous republic and it was Crimea.
United Arab Emirates; Capital: Abu Dhabi	Widely recognized UN member state; the United Arab Emirates was a federation of seven emirates. (Note: 7 emirates: Abu Dhabi, Ajman, Dubai, Fujairah, Ras al-Khaimah, Sharjah, and Umm al-Qaiwain.)
United Kingdom – United Kingdom of Great Britain and Northern Ireland; Capital: London	Widely recognized UN member state. Commonwealth realm and EU member. The United Kingdom was composed of four constituent countries: England, Northern Ireland, Scotland, and Wales. It had sovereignty over the following dependent territories (referred to as "overseas territories" after 26 February 2002): Anguilla; Bermuda; British Antarctic Territory (suspended under the Antarctic Treaty); British Indian Ocean Territory (disputed by Mauritius and the Seychelles); British Virgin Islands; Cayman Islands; Falkland Islands (disputed by Argentina); Gibraltar; Montserrat; Pitcairn Islands; Saint Helena (to 1 September 2009), with two dependencies; Ascension Island (to 1 September 2009); Tristan da Cunha (to 1 September 2009); Saint Helena, Ascension and Tristan da Cunha (from 1 September 2009); South Georgia and the South Sandwich Islands (disputed by Argentina); Sovereign Base Areas of Akrotiri and Dhekelia; Turks and Caicos Islands; In addition, the British Monarch had direct sovereignty over three self-governing Crown dependencies: Guernsey, with two dependencies: Alderney; Sark; Isle of Man; Jersey
United States – United States of America; Capital: Washington, D.C.	Widely recognized UN member state. The United States was a federation of 50 states, one federal district, and one incorporated territory. (Note: 50 states: Alabama, Alaska, Arizona, Arkansas, California, Colorado, Connecticut, Delaware, Florida, Georgia, Hawaii, Idaho, Illinois, Indiana, Iowa, Kansas, Kentucky, Louisiana, Maine, Maryland, Massachusetts, Michigan, Minnesota, Mississippi, Missouri, Montana, Nebraska, Nevada, New Hampshire, New Jersey, New Mexico, New York, North Carolina, North Dakota, Ohio, Oklahoma, Oregon, Pennsylvania, Rhode Island, South Carolina, South Dakota, Tennessee, Texas, Utah, Vermont, Virginia, Washington, West Virginia, Wisconsin, Wyoming. 1 federal district: District of Columbia. 1 incorporated territory: Palmyra Atoll.) It asserted sovereignty over the following inhabited insular areas: American Samoa (including Swains Island, disputed by Tokelau); Guam; Northern Mariana Islands; Puerto Rico; United States Virgin Islands
Uruguay – Eastern Republic of Uruguay; Capital: Montevideo	Widely recognized UN member state.
Uzbekistan – Republic of Uzbekistan; Capital: Tashkent	Widely recognized UN member state. Uzbekistan had one autonomous republic: Karakalpakstan.
=== V ===
Vanuatu – Republic of Vanuatu; Capital: Port Vila	Widely recognized UN member state.
→ Vatican City – Vatican City State; Capital: Vatican City	Widely recognized independent state. Vatican City was administered by the Holy See, a sovereign entity recognized by a large number of countries and a Permanent observer at the United Nations. The Holy See also administered a number of extraterritorial properties in Italy. The Pope was the ex officio head of state of Vatican City.
→ Venezuela; Capital: Caracas: Bolivarian Republic of Venezuela (to 12 April 2002) (Note: After being installed as interim president of Venezuela on 14 April 2002, Pedro Carmona issued a decree which voided the 1999 constitution.); Republic of Venezuela (from 12 April 2002 to 13 April 2002) (Note: Hugo Chávez returned to power on 13 April 2002 and restored the Constitution of Venezuela.); Bolivarian Republic of Venezuela (from 13 April 2002)	Widely recognized UN member state. Venezuela was a federation of 23 states, one federal dependency, and one federal district. (Note: 23 states: Amazonas, Anzoátegui, Apure, Aragua, Barinas, Bolívar, Carabobo, Cojedes, Delta Amacuro, Falcón, Guárico, Lara, Mérida, Miranda, Monagas, Nueva Esparta, Portuguesa, Sucre, Táchira, Trujillo, Vargas, Yaracuy, Zulia. 1 federal district: Capital District. 1 federal dependency: Federal Dependencies.)
Vietnam – Socialist Republic of Vietnam; Capital: Hanoi	Widely recognized UN member state. Vietnam claimed sovereignty over the Paracel Islands (disputed by the People's Republic of China and the Republic of China) and Spratly Islands (disputed by the People's Republic of China, the Republic of China, Brunei, the Philippines, and Malaysia).
=== Y ===
Yemen – Republic of Yemen; Capital: Sana'a	Widely recognized UN member state.
=== Z ===
Zambia – Republic of Zambia; Capital: Lusaka	Widely recognized UN member state.
Zimbabwe – Republic of Zimbabwe; Capital: Harare	Widely recognized UN member state.

== Non-UN members or observers ==
Name and capital city	Information on status and recognition of sovereignty
Abkhazia – Republic of Abkhazia; Capital: Sokhumi	Partially recognized de facto self-governing entity. (Note: Abkhazia was recognized by South Ossetia (from 19 September 2005), Transnistria (from 17 November 2006), Russia (from 26 August 2008), Nicaragua (from 5 September 2008), Venezuela (from 10 September 2009), and Nauru (from 15 December 2009).) Claimed by Georgia as the Autonomous Republic of Abkhazia.
Afghanistan, Islamic Emirate of (to 7 December 2001) (Note: Kandahar, the last major city under Taliban control, fell to the Islamic State of Afghanistan on 7 December 2001.); Capital: Kabul (to 13 November 2001), Kandahar (from 13 November 2001)	Partially recognized de facto independent state. Claimed to be the sole legitimate government of Afghanistan but only controlled a small portion of the country after 13 November 2001.
Anjouan – State of Anjouan (to 10 March 2002); Capital: Mutsamudu	De facto self-governing entity. Not recognized by any other state. Claimed by the Comoros.
Cook Islands; Capital: Avarua	A state in free association with New Zealand, recognized by China. The Cook Islands is a member of multiple UN agencies with full treaty making capacity. It shares a head of state with New Zealand as well as having shared citizenship.
Chechnya – Chechen Republic of Ichkeria (to 6 February 2000) (Note: Grozny fell to the Russians on 6 February 2000, ending the de facto independence of Chechnya.); Capital: Dzhokhar-Ghala	Partially recognized de facto self-governing entity. Claimed by Russia as the Republic of Chechnya.
Kosova – Republic of Kosova (to 1 February 2000); Capital: Pristina	Partially recognized de facto independent state.
Kosovo – Republic of Kosovo (from 17 February 2008) (Note: Kosovo unilaterally declared independence from Serbia on 17 February 2008.); Capital: Pristina	Partially recognized de facto self-governing entity. Claimed by Serbia as the Autonomous Province of Kosovo and Metohija under UN administration
Mohéli – Democratic Republic of Mohéli (to 10 March 2002); Capital: Fomboni	De facto self-governing entity. Not recognized by any other state. Claimed by the Comoros.
Nagorno-Karabakh – Nagorno-Karabakh Republic; Capital: Stepanakert	De facto self-governing entity. Not recognized by any other state. Claimed by Azerbaijan.
Niue; Capital: Alofi	A state in free association with New Zealand, recognized by China (from 12 December 2007). Niue is a member of multiple UN agencies with full treaty making capacity. It had shared citizenship with New Zealand.
Northern Cyprus – Turkish Republic of Northern Cyprus; Capital: Lefkoşa	Partially recognized de facto self-governing entity. Claimed by the Republic of Cyprus.
Palestine – State of Palestine (Note: See the following on statehood criteria: Mendes, Errol (30 March 2010), Statehood and Palestine for the purposes of Article 12 (3) of the ICC Statute (PDF), 30 March 2010, pp. 28, 33: "...the Palestinian State also meets the traditional criteria under the Montevideo Convention..."; "...the fact that a majority of states have recognized Palestine as a State should easily fulfill the requisite state practice".; McKinney, Kathryn M. (1994), "The Legal Effects of the Israeli-PLO Declaration ofPrinciples: Steps Toward Statehood for Palestine", Seattle University Law Review, 18 (93), Seattle University: 97, archived from the original on 2011-07-22: "It is possible, however, to argue for Palestinian statehood based on the constitutive theory".; McDonald, Avril (Spring 2009), "Operation Cast Lead: Drawing the Battle Lines of the Legal Dispute", Human Rights Brief, 25, Washington College of Law, Center for Human Rights and Humanitarian Law: "Whether one applies the criteria of statehood set out in the Montevideo Convention or the more widely accepted constitutive theory of statehood, Palestine might be considered a state."); Capital: Ramallah (administrative), Gaza City (administrative), Jerusalem (claimed)	Disputed region consisting of three occupied territories: the West Bank, the Gaza Strip, and East Jerusalem. The declared State of Palestine, which claimed independence for all the Palestinian territories, was recognized by a large number of countries. In foreign relations, Palestine was represented by the Palestine Liberation Organization, which was a permanent observer at the United Nations. The Palestinian National Authority was an interim administrative body that exercised limited control over parts of the West Bank and the Gaza Strip. From 12 September 2005 to 15 June 2007, the PNA controlled all of Gaza. After 15 June 2007, Gaza was under the control of Hamas.
Puntland – Puntland State of Somalia (to 1 July 2001); Capital: Garowe	De facto self-governing entity. Not recognized by any other state. Claimed by Somalia.
Sahrawi Arab Democratic Republic; Capital: Bir Lehlou (official), Rabouni (seat of government-in-exile), El Aaiún (claimed)	Partially recognized de facto self-governing entity. The Sahrawi Arab Democratic Republic claimed the disputed territory of Western Sahara, most of which was under control of Morocco. The territories under its control, the so-called Free Zone, were claimed by Morocco. Its government resided in exile in Tindouf, Algeria.
Somaliland – Republic of Somaliland; Capital: Hargeisa	De facto self-governing entity. Not recognized by any other state. Claimed by Somalia.
South Ossetia – Republic of South Ossetia; Capital: Tskhinvali	Partially recognized de facto independent state. (Note: South Ossetia was recognized by Abkhazia (from 19 September 2005), Transnistria (from 17 November 2006), Russia (from 26 August 2008), Nicaragua (from 5 September 2008), Venezuela (from 10 September 2009), and Nauru (from 16 December 2009).) Claimed by Georgia (as the Provisional Administrative Entity of South Ossetia from April 2007).
Taiwan – Republic of China; Capital: Taipei (seat of government), Nanjing (claimed)	Partially recognized de facto independent state but de jure widely recognized UN member state. The Republic of China claimed to be the sole legitimate government of China, but only administered Taiwan, Kinmen, the Matsu Islands, Pratas Island and Itu Aba. The Republic of China had territorial claims over Mongolia; the Russian republic of Tuva; the Sixty-Four Villages East of the River (administered by Russia); The majority of Gorno-Badakhshan (administered by Tajikistan); The eastern tip of the Wakhan Corridor (administered by Afghanistan); a small portion of Gilgit-Baltistan (administered by Pakistan and part of the disputed Kashmir region); Aksai Chin (administered by the People's Republic of China and part of the disputed Kashmir region); eastern Bhutan; South Tibet (controlled by India); and Kachin State (administered by Myanmar).
Tamil Eelam (to 18 May 2009); Capital: Trincomalee	Unrecognized de facto self-governing entity. Claimed by Sri Lanka.
Transnistria – Pridnestrovian Moldavian Republic; Capital: Tiraspol	Partially recognized de facto self-governing entity. (Note: Transnistria was recognized by Abkhazia (from 17 November 2006) and South Ossetia (from 17 November 2006).) Claimed by Moldova.

== Other entities ==
Excluded from the list above are the following noteworthy entities which either were not fully sovereign or did not claim to be independent:

- Antarctica as a whole had no government and no permanent population. Seven states claimed portions of Antarctica and five of these had reciprocally recognised one another's claims. These claims, which were regulated by the Antarctic Treaty System, were neither recognised nor disputed by any other signatory state.
- The European Union was a sui generis supranational organisation which had 15 (later 28) member states. The member states had transferred a measure of their legislative, executive, and judicial powers to the institutions of the EU, and as such the EU had some elements of sovereignty, without generally being considered a sovereign state. The European Union did not claim to be a sovereign state and had only limited capacity for relations with other states.
- Kosovo was a territory that was nominally part of Serbia and Montenegro (until 2006) and then Serbia (from 2006 to 2008), but was under United Nations administration as part of the United Nations Interim Administration Mission in Kosovo.
- The Sovereign Military Order of Malta was a United Nations observer. The order had bi-lateral diplomatic relations with a large number of states, but has no territory other than extraterritorial areas within Rome. The order's Constitution stated: "The Order is a subject of international law and exercises sovereign functions." Although the order frequently asserted its sovereignty, it did not claim to be a sovereign state. It lacked a defined territory. Since all its members were citizens of other states, almost all of them lived in their native countries, and those who resided in the order's extraterritorial properties in Rome did so only in connection with their official duties, the order lacked the characteristic of having a permanent population.
- The United Nations Transitional Administration in East Timor was a transitional non-independent territory governed by the United Nations. It was neither sovereign nor under the sovereignty of any other state. It became the independent state of East Timor on 20 May 2002.

== See also ==
- List of sovereign states by year
- 2000s (decade)
- List of state leaders in 2000
- List of state leaders in 2001
- List of state leaders in 2002
- List of state leaders in 2003
- List of state leaders in 2004
- List of state leaders in 2005
- List of state leaders in 2006
- List of state leaders in 2007
- List of state leaders in 2008
- List of state leaders in 2009
