= La festival de Capisterre =

Annual festival in Capisterre, St. Kitts

La festival de Capisterre is an annual festival celebrated in the region of Capisterre, St. Kitts.

== Overview ==
The Capisterre region was the earliest area in St. Kitts to be settled by Europeans and was part of French St. Christophe from 1625 to 1713. The area now holds four main settlements: Newton Ground village, St. Paul's village, Dieppe Bay Town, and Parson's Ground village, all separated from each other by miles of sugarcane fields.

== History ==
The festival was established in 2001 to foster unity amongst these four villages, often dubbed by locals "the back of de land" due to their being the furthest locations on the island from the capital city of Basseterre. Individually, each village would have proved to be too small to hold a truly profitable community festival, but the union of the four villages resulted in the exact opposite—the largest community festival in the federation of Saint Kitts and Nevis in terms of both participant population and generated income. The income generated from the activities is in turn used to better the communities of Capisterre. The festival is celebrated in September around the time of the Independence celebrations.
