= Cabinet secretary =

Civil service position in several parliamentary democracies

A cabinet secretary is typically a senior official, often a career civil servant, responsible for providing administrative services and strategic advice to a government's cabinet of ministers. While the role is often centered within a Cabinet Office or Secretariat, its functions vary significantly by jurisdiction. In several Westminster-style systems, the cabinet secretary also serves as the head of the civil service, exercising broad authority over governmental administration and policy implementation.

The title of cabinet secretary may also be used as an alternative term for a politically appointed cabinet minister, derived from secretary of state—the formal title for ministers. This naming convention is used in Japan, Kenya, Scotland and the United States.

== Parliamentary systems ==
=== Australia ===
In Australia the equivalent position is the Secretary of the Department of the Prime Minister and Cabinet, although both the department and its secretary have wider responsibilities than in most other governments derived from the Westminster System.

Prime Minister Scott Morrison established a position entitled Cabinet Secretary in August 2019 within the Prime Minister's Office responsible for cabinet operations and appointed a former senior political adviser and intelligence official Andrew Shearer to the role.

The Cabinet Secretary is also a title conferred on an Australian minister responsible for assisting the prime minister to manage the day-to-day procedural and operational matters of the Cabinet and any Cabinet committees. As per all other ministers in the Westminster system, the Cabinet Secretary is a sitting member of Parliament, chosen by the Prime Minister and officially appointed by the Governor-General. The Cabinet Secretary is a portfolio minister of the Department of the Prime Minister and Cabinet and has existed at various stages since 2007.

Australia's states and territories have equivalent officials

- New South Wales: Secretary of the Cabinet Office
- Victoria: Secretary of the Department of Premier and Cabinet
- Queensland: Director-General of the Department of the Premier and Cabinet
- South Australia: Chief Executive of the Department of the Premier and Cabinet
- Western Australia: Director General of the Department of the Premier and Cabinet
- Tasmania: Secretary and Head of the State Service
- Australian Capital Territory: Director General of the Chief Minister, Treasury and Economic Development Directorate
- Northern Territory: Cabinet Secretary

=== Canada ===
In Canada the equivalent position is the Clerk of the Privy Council, who functions as Deputy Minister to the prime minister of Canada and heads the Privy Council Office. Canada's provinces and territories also have equivalent officials as the head of their respective public services, as in the list below:

- Alberta: Deputy Minister of Executive Council and Secretary to the Cabinet
- British Columbia: Deputy Minister to the Premier and Cabinet Secretary
- Manitoba: Clerk of the Executive Council
- New Brunswick: Clerk of the Executive Council and Secretary to Cabinet
- Newfoundland and Labrador: Clerk of the Executive Council and Secretary to the Cabinet
- Nova Scotia: the head of the civil service is the Clerk of the Executive Council, while the Secretary to the Cabinet is a separate position.
- Ontario: Secretary of the Cabinet and Clerk of the Executive Council
- Prince Edward Island: the head of the civil service is the Clerk of the Executive Council, while the Premier's Principal Secretary advises the Premier and Cabinet on matters of policy and strategy
- Quebec: Secrétaire général du Conseil exécutif (Secretary General of the Executive Council)
- Saskatchewan: Deputy Minister to the Premier and Cabinet Secretary
- Northwest Territories: Secretary to the Cabinet
- Nunavut: Secretary to Cabinet
- Yukon: Cabinet Secretary and Deputy Minister of the Executive Council Office

=== India ===
The Cabinet Secretariat is under the direct charge of the Prime Minister. The administrative head of the Cabinet Secretariat is the Cabinet Secretary who is also the ex-officio Chairman of the Civil Services Board, and thus the head of the Indian Administrative Service. As a matter of convention the senior most civil servant is appointed as a Cabinet Secretary. They are a part of the Indian Administrative Service. The incumbent generally has a tenure of two to three years. Though there is no fixed tenure. His or her tenure however, can be extended. The Cabinet Secretary is the head of all the civil services under the constitution which is the All India Civil Services and the Central Civil Services (Grade A and Grade B). The secretary's status in the Indian order of precedence is equivalent to that of the Attorney General of India and just above chiefs of staff or equivalent in the armed services holding the rank of full general.

The functions of the Cabinet Secretary in India are:

1. Provide assistance to the Council of Ministers
2. Act as advisor and conscience keeper of the civil services
3. Handle senior appointments
4. Prepare the agenda of the Cabinet
5. Attend the meetings of the Cabinet
6. Ensure that the Cabinet decisions are implemented
7. Advise the Prime Minister
8. Act as the Chairman of the Committee of Secretaries on Administration
9. Act as the Chairman of the Chief Secretaries Committee
10. Provide an element of continuity and stability to administration during crises

The Cabinet Secretariat is responsible for the administration of the Government of India (Transaction of Business) Rules, 1961 and the Government of India (Allocation of Business) Rules 1961, facilitating smooth transaction of business in Ministries/Departments of the Government by ensuring adherence to these rules. The Secretariat assists in decision-making in Government by ensuring Inter-Ministerial coordination, ironing out differences amongst Ministries/Departments and evolving consensus through the instrumentality of the standing/ad hoc Committees of Secretaries. Through this mechanism new policy initiatives are also promoted.

The Cabinet Secretariat ensures that the president of India, the vice-president and Ministers are kept informed of the major activities of all Departments by means of a monthly summary of their activities. Management of major crisis situations in the country and coordinating activities of the various Ministries in such a situation is also one of the functions of the Cabinet Secretariat.

The Cabinet Secretary is arguably India's most powerful bureaucrat.

=== Ireland ===
In Ireland the position of Cabinet Secretary is officially titled Secretary-General to the Government (previously titled Secretary to the Government), and is concurrently Secretary-General of the Department of the Taoiseach, somewhat analogous to the Cabinet Office in the United Kingdom. This department provides the secretariat to the Cabinet and co-ordinates the Government Press Office. It also has some policy functions with regard to key areas such as Northern Ireland, economic policy, and public service modernisation. The role is modeled on, and is broadly similar to, the UK equivalent, though in recent times has become more constrained by the seven-year time limit placed on Secretaries General in the mid-1990s following the introduction of the Strategic Management Initiative.

=== Israel ===
In Israel, the Cabinet Secretary heads an office responsible for preparing the agenda of cabinet meetings and facilitating communication between ministers. The secretariat is also responsible for presenting government-initiated bills to the Knesset and for conducting certain press briefings. The secretary is appointed on the recommendation of the prime minister, with the current secretary being Yossi Fuchs.

=== Japan ===
In Japan the office of Chief cabinet secretary has been made into a ministerial post, being held by a member of the House of Representatives. This is unusual, as most countries give the position to a civil servant. The chief cabinet secretary performs much the same role as other cabinet secretaries; however, he or she is responsible for overseeing the administrative operations of Cabinet, and presiding over the Cabinet Secretariat. The post has the added function of being the government's chief press secretary.

=== New Zealand ===
In New Zealand the Cabinet Secretary is part of the Department of the Prime Minister and Cabinet, which provides assistance, coordination, and advice. The Cabinet Secretary also serves as Clerk of the Executive Council, the formal body on which Cabinet rests. The office of Cabinet Secretary is somewhat anomalous, by New Zealand standards, in that it is partly autonomous from the department to which it belongs. The role does not, however, have the broad powers given to its British equivalent – for example, authority over the civil service is held by the State Services Commissioner, a separate official.

=== Pakistan ===
In Pakistan the Cabinet Secretary is a senior civil servant who is responsible for running the Cabinet Division.

=== Saint Kitts and Nevis ===
In 2015, Josephine Huggins was appointed the country's first female cabinet secretary.

=== United Kingdom ===
In the UK Government the Cabinet Secretary is the most senior civil servant in the country, providing policy advice to the prime minister and Cabinet. The role is currently occupied by Dame Antonia Romeo, appointed in February 2026 following the resignation of Sir Chris Wormald.

From 1981 to 2011, the position of Cabinet Secretary had been combined with the roles of Head of the Home Civil Service and Cabinet Office Permanent Secretary. The first means that the Cabinet Secretary is responsible for all the civil servants of the various departments within government (except the Foreign Office), chairing the Permanent Secretaries Management Group (PSMG) which is the principal governing body of the civil service. The second means that the Cabinet Secretary is responsible for leading the government department that provides administrative support to the Prime Minister and Cabinet. The post is appointed by the prime minister with the advice of the out-going Cabinet Secretary and the First Civil Service Commissioner.

With the retirement of Gus O'Donnell, who served from 2005 until the end of 2011, the three roles hitherto performed by the Cabinet Secretary were split: the Cabinet Secretary would provide policy advice to the Prime Minister and Cabinet; the Head of the Home Civil Service would provide leadership for the whole Civil Service; and the Permanent Secretary would oversee the Cabinet Office. O'Donnell was succeeded by Jeremy Heywood as Cabinet Secretary, Bob Kerslake as Head of the Home Civil Service and Permanent Secretary at the Department for Communities and Local Government and Ian Watmore as lastly, Cabinet Office Permanent Secretary.

The responsibilities of the job vary from time to time and depend very much on the personal qualities of both the prime minister and Cabinet Secretary of the day. In most cases the true influence of the Cabinet Secretary extends far beyond administrative matters, and reaches to the very heart of the decision-making process. For instance, the Cabinet Secretary is responsible for administering the Ministerial Code which governs the conduct of ministers (also known as the Rule Book and formerly Questions of Procedure for Ministers). In this duty the Cabinet Secretary may be asked to investigate leaks within government, and enforce Cabinet discipline. This gives the unelected Cabinet Secretary some authority over elected ministers (a situation satirised in the BBC sitcom Yes, Prime Minister).

The Cabinet Secretary is responsible for overseeing the intelligence services and their relationship to the government, though since 2002 this responsibility has been delegated to a full-time role (initially as Security and Intelligence Co-ordinator, now the Head of Intelligence, Security and Resilience working to the National Security Adviser), with the Cabinet Secretary focussing on civil service reforms to help deliver the government's policy programme.

==== Devolved governments ====
The term cabinet secretary is currently also used to refer to the senior cabinet members of the Scottish and Welsh governments.

Following the 2007 General Election of the devolved Scottish Parliament, the new First Minister Alex Salmond restyled the Scottish Executive to be branded as the Scottish Government, whilst senior ministers were re-titled from ministers to cabinet secretaries. Similarly, junior ministers were re-titled from deputy ministers to minister.

The Welsh Government followed suit in 2016 under first minister Carwyn Jones, in order to reflect the government's expansion of powers in recent years. It reverted back to the original names from 2018 to 2024 under Mark Drakeford, before returning to the cabinet secretary titles under Vaughan Gething. After Rhun ap Iorwerth became first minister, senior ministers were re-styled as cabinet ministers.

== Presidential systems ==
=== China ===
The Secretary-General of the State Council is an executive position within the State Council of the People's Republic of China. It ranks below the Premier and above the Ministers of various ministries and departments. The current secretary general is State Councilor Wu Zhenglong, a former CCP secretary and governor of Jiangsu Province, China. The Secretary-General is responsible for the day-to-day work of the State Council and is in charge of the State Council General Office.

==== Hong Kong, China ====
In Hong Kong there is a politically appointed Director of the Chief Executive's Office, as well as a Permanent Secretary who is a civil servant.

The position of Director was first established in 2002 as part of the 'Principal Officials Accountability System', and it was not clear whether it was a politically appointed or a civil service position. Nevertheless, its salary level was tied to that of permanent secretaries (Point 8 of the Directorate Payscale) instead of that of politically appointed secretaries. The first office holder Lam Woon Kwong was a civil servant who opted for early retirement directly from this position in January 2005; and therefore did not subsequently take up any civil service or politically appointed position. Lam was not the most senior Administrative Officer and the position did not provide him any seniority over other permanent secretaries.

It was until January 2006, that the appointment of John Tsang to the position confirmed the position as a politically appointed office. Prior to his appointment, John Tsang was a politically appointed secretary, as the Secretary for Commerce, Industry and Technology. In July 2007, as part of the expansion of the political appointment system to introduce two layers of politically appointed junior secretaries, the salary level of the position was changed to tie with that of politically appointed secretaries. The office holder is also officially given the duty to co-ordinate the works of different bureaus (as Hong Kong ministries are known since 1997), making the office holder politically more powerful, regardless of his or her seniority.

The position of Permanent Secretary was first created as a non-permanent position supernumerary post from August 2005 to January 2006, while the position of the Director was left vacant. The salary level was set as the same as other Permanent Secretaries, i.e. Point 8 of the Directorate Pay Scale, aka the D8 rank. From February 2006 onwards, the post became permanent but the salary level was changed to D6, which is lower than Permanent Secretaries in the then 11 bureaux. The office is never filled by the most senior administrative officer as in other countries.

Unlike other countries, the Clerk of the Executive Council is a separate position, filled by an administrative officer of the D2 rank. The office holder nevertheless is required to take an oath of secrecy.

=== Indonesia ===
The Cabinet Secretary is called Sekretaris Kabinet in Indonesian language, usually act as one of the President's spokesperson.

=== Kenya ===
Secretary to the Cabinet The office of Secretary the Cabinet was established in 1963. The officer was in charge of the Cabinet Office and assisted the Prime Minister in managing cabinet affairs. The Secretary to the Cabinet was appointee of the Governor General, in consultation with the Public Service Commission and the Prime Minister at the time. The position was retained after Kenya became a republic and elevated to Secretary to the cabinet and Head of Public Service, appointed by the President. The officer would be the senior most civil servant, in charge of the Civil Service and the Cabinet Office. Under the 2010 constitution, the Secretary to the Cabinet is defined as in charge of cabinet office and is appointed by the president subject to parliamentary approval upon vetting. The current holder of the office is Ms.Mercy Wanjau

=== Philippines ===
In the Philippines the Cabinet Secretary was a cabinet-level rank of the Cabinet. Under the present constitution and the initial implementing guidelines pursuant to Executive Order No. 237, series of 1987, the primary mandate was to provide technical support to the Cabinet, primary advisory counsel to the President, as well as the following:

1. Assist in providing timely and organized information to the Cabinet on issues and problems submitted for decision and action.
2. Provide conference and administrative support services to the Cabinet, the Cabinet Clusters, the Cabinet Assistance System and other committees created by the Cabinet.
3. Conduct technical research and special studies on specific policy issues.
4. Maintain an efficient records-management system, including a Cabinet Archives and a library.
5. Certify Cabinet resolutions that indicate agreements and actions reached during Cabinet meetings.
6. Exercise such other functions and powers as may be provided by law or as directed by the President.

On June 30, 2022, President Bongbong Marcos abolished the office with its powers and responsibiliities be transferred to the Presidential Management Staff.

=== Sri Lanka ===
In Sri Lanka the Cabinet Secretary is the head of the Cabinet Office. The post is held by a civil servant and it is equal to a Permanent Secretary.

=== United States ===
In the United States there is an official called the Cabinet Secretary within the Executive Office of the President charged with maintaining relations between members of the Cabinet and the White House. The position is not a civil service position, instead being subject to presidential appointment.

However, the term "Cabinet Secretary" is also sometimes used in a generic sense to refer to one of the members of the United States Cabinet, as these people are titled Secretary (e.g., Secretary of State or Secretary of Defense). This usage is not official, and differs from the use in other countries.

== See also ==
- Secretary of the Government (disambiguation)
