= Capesterre =

Capesterre is an old French seafaring term meaning "land facing the wind", as opposed to Basseterre, "land sheltered from the wind". The word designates the side of the Caribbean Islands which first meets the trade winds, i.e. the eastern side of the Islands. This term was opposed to "Basseterre" (literally "Down Land") which designated the side of the Caribbean Islands located downwind, i.e. the western side.

Capesterre is part of the name of two communes in the French overseas région and département of Guadeloupe, in the Lesser Antilles:

- Capesterre-Belle-Eau on the eastern side of Basse-Terre Island
- Capesterre-de-Marie-Galante on the eastern side of the island of Marie-Galante

== See also ==
- Capisterre, St Kitts (same etymology)
