= Dieppe Bay Town =

- Location in Saint Kitts and Nevis
- Coordinates: 17°25′N 062°49′W
- Country: Saint Kitts and Nevis
- Island: Saint Kitts
- Parish: Saint John Capesterre

Dieppe Bay Town is a town in Saint John Capisterre Parish in the island of Saint Kitts, in the country of Saint Kitts and Nevis in the West Indies.

== History ==
The first settlement was founded in 1538, when a group of French Huguenots refugees, that came from Dieppe, a normand fishing port, found safe haven on Saint Kitts island. It is the oldest town founded by Europeans in the whole of the Eastern Caribbean. The original town only survived two weeks before it was destroyed by the Spanish, but it was re-founded in 1625 by French settlers led by Pierre Belain d'Esnambuc. Dieppe Bay Town is the co-capital of St. John Capisterre Parish along with Saddlers. Originally the northern part of the parish was ruled by France, in the region of "Capisterre de St. Christophe", of which Dieppe was the capital. The southern part of the parish was ruled by the United Kingdom, in "British Saint Christopher", which had its parish capital in Saddlers. When Britain took full control of the island in 1713, both capitals remained.

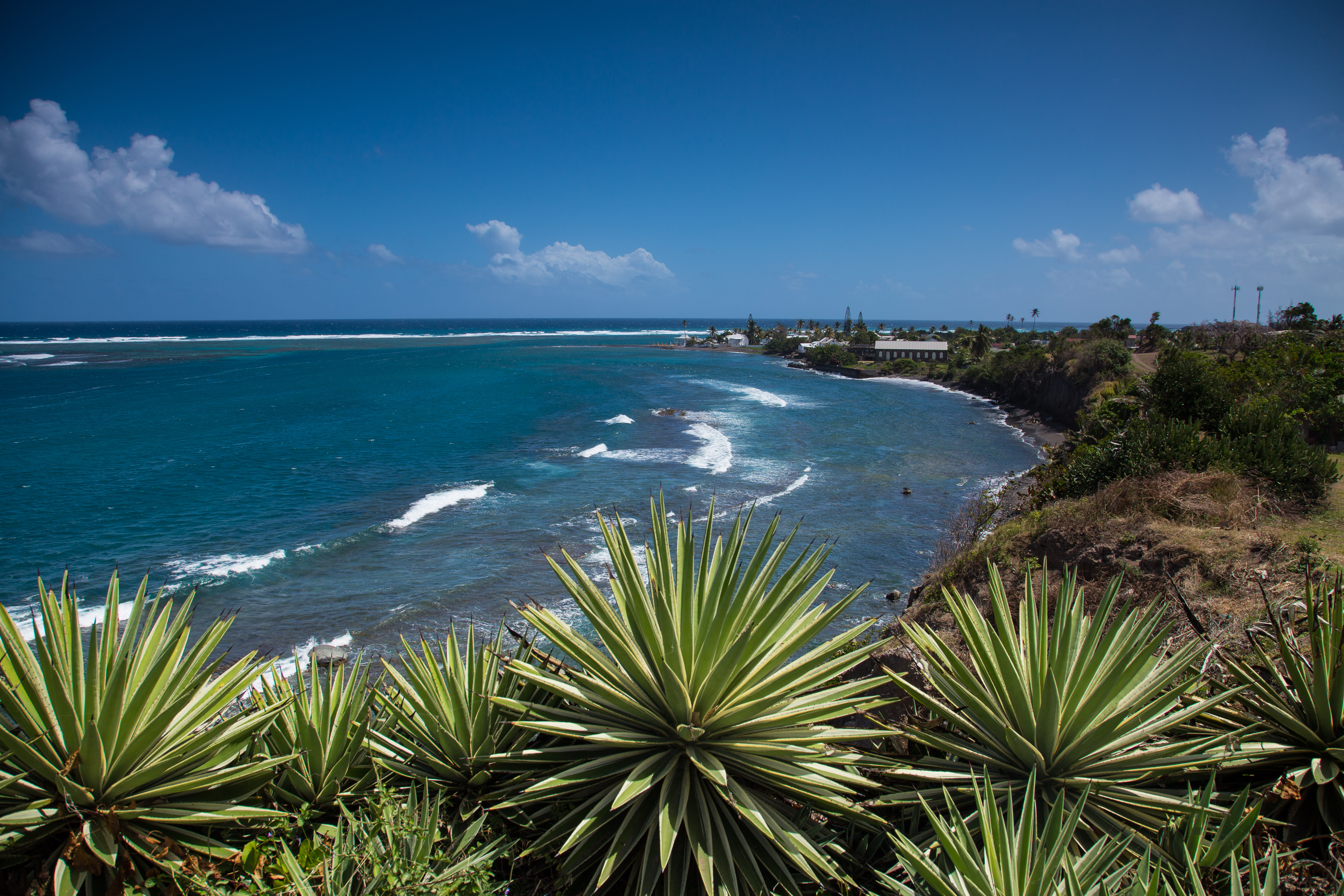
Dieppe Bay coastline

The town was once home to a busy port, situated along the harbour at Dieppe. The harbour was renowned on the island due to the large coral reef formations offshore which gave it strong protection against the heavy waves which tended to prevent Atlantic coast development elsewhere. The port however, saw its functions cease after all business was shifted to Basseterre after Basseterre was made the capital of St. Kitts in 1723.

Dieppe Bay is currently a very small settlement with a very small population, however its historical significance to St. Kitts, and its former status as capital of the Capisterre region has allowed it to earn the status of "town". It is the fifth town of Saint Kitts after Basseterre, Sandy Point, Cayon, and Old Road.

Its current population is estimated at 592 persons and it is ranked 20th in population of all settlements in Saint Kitts and Nevis. Many of the inhabitants are ethnically French and are descended from fishermen who migrated from St. Barts. They were attracted to the area by the reef.

== Geography ==
Dieppe Bay is situated on the northern coast of the island of Saint Kitts at the base of Mount Liamuiga. It is surrounded in the Atlantic Ocean by coral reefs, which protect the beach from strong waves and form a natural harbour.

== Notable people ==
- Josephine Huggins, civil servant.

== See also ==
- French settlement in Saint Kitts and Nevis
