= Black Rocks (Saint Kitts) =

Coordinates: 17°24′13.9″N 62°46′49.8″W

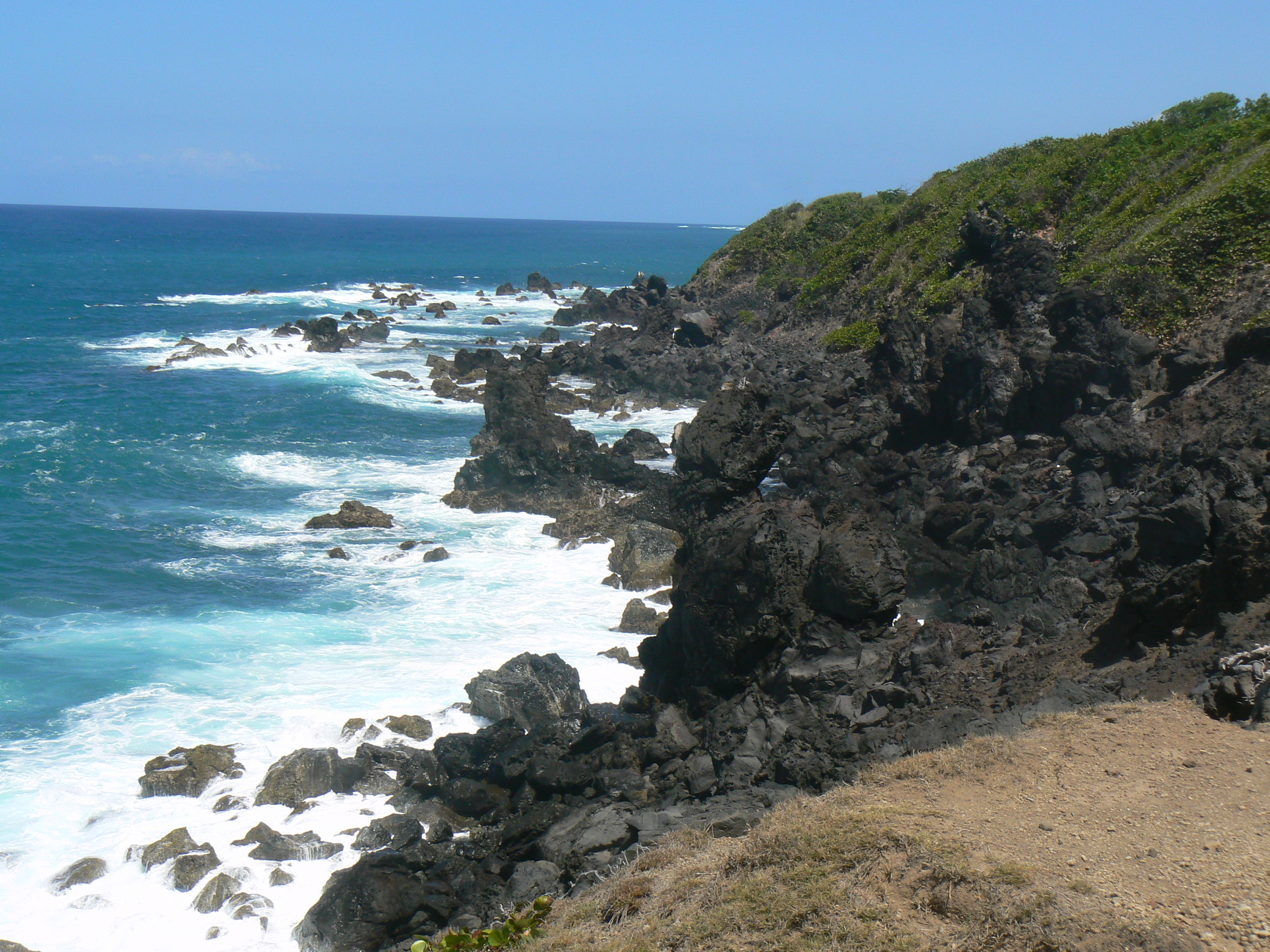

Black Rocks, also called Black Stone, is the name of a rock formation on the northeastern coast of the island of Saint Kitts. Located close to the town of Saddlers, the rocks consist of lava flow from the volcanic Mount Liamuiga which dominates the northern half of the island of Saint Kitts.
