= Josephine Huggins =

Kittitian civil servant and first female secretary

Josephine Huggins CMG

Cabinet secretary of Saint Kitts and Nevis
- In office 2015–2022

Personal details
- Born: Saint Kitts and Nevis

Josephine Huggins is a Saint Kitts and Nevis civil servant. She served as the country's first female cabinet secretary.

== Biography ==
Josephine Huggins comes from Dieppe Bay Town. As a businesswoman, she served as Assistant Comptroller of Inland Revenue in St. Kitts and Nevis between 1970 and 1992.

She was appointed cabinet secretary in 2015, becoming the first woman holder of the role. Huggins left the role of cabinet secretary in 2022. She was previously served as head of the Federation’s Public Service Commission and Police Service Commission.

In the 2020 New Year Honours, she was made Companion of the Most Distinguished Order of Saint Michael and Saint George (CMG).
