= Saddlers =

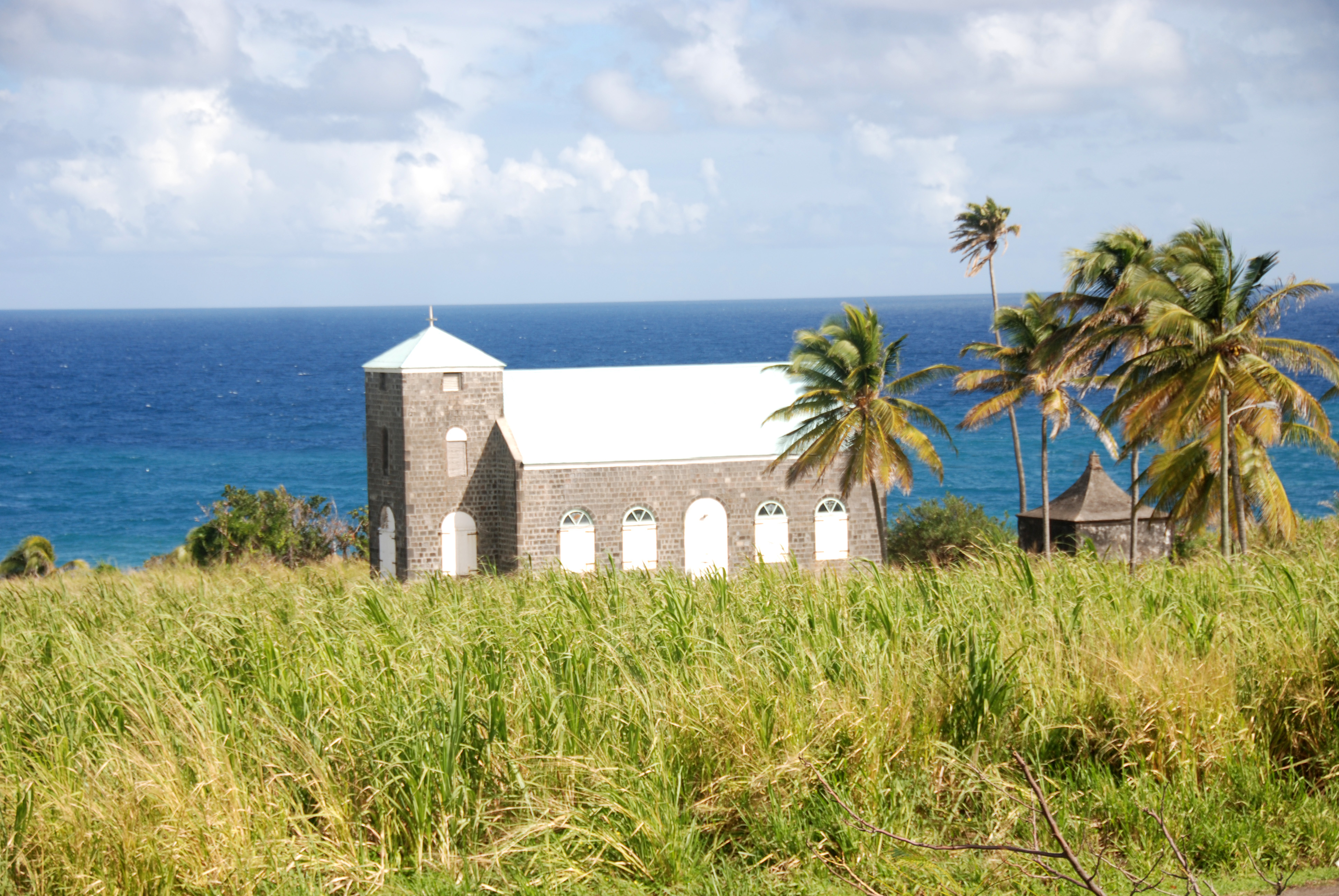
- Church at Saddlers

- Location in Saint Kitts and Nevis
- Coordinates: 17°24′17″N 062°47′31″W
- Country: Saint Kitts and Nevis
- Island: Saint Kitts
- Parish: Saint John Capesterre

Saddlers is a town in Saint John Capesterre Parish, on Saint Kitts island in Saint Kitts and Nevis.

It is the co-capital of the parish along with Dieppe Bay Town.

Originally the parish territory was partly ruled by France and partly by the British Empire. When Britain took full control of the island in 1713, both capitals remained.

== Geography ==
A notable volcanic rock formation, Black Rocks, lies just to the southeast of the town.

Its population is estimated at 1,205.

== See also ==
- Populated places in Saint Kitts and Nevis
