= List of volcanoes in Saint Kitts and Nevis =

A list of active and extinct volcanoes in the Federation of Saint Kitts and Nevis, located in the Caribbean.

The two islands of Saint Kitts and Nevis are located in the Leeward Islands chain of the Lesser Antilles archipelago.

== List ==
Name	Elevation		Location	Last eruption
Name	meters	feet	Coordinates	Last eruption
Mount Liamuiga	1156	3793	17.37°N 62.80°W	160
Nevis Peak	985	3232	17.15°N 62.58°W	Holocene

== See also ==
- Volcanoes of the Caribbean
- Lists of volcanoes
