= Saint Paul Capisterre Parish =

Coordinates: 17°23′38″N 62°50′08″W

Saint Paul Capisterre
- Parish
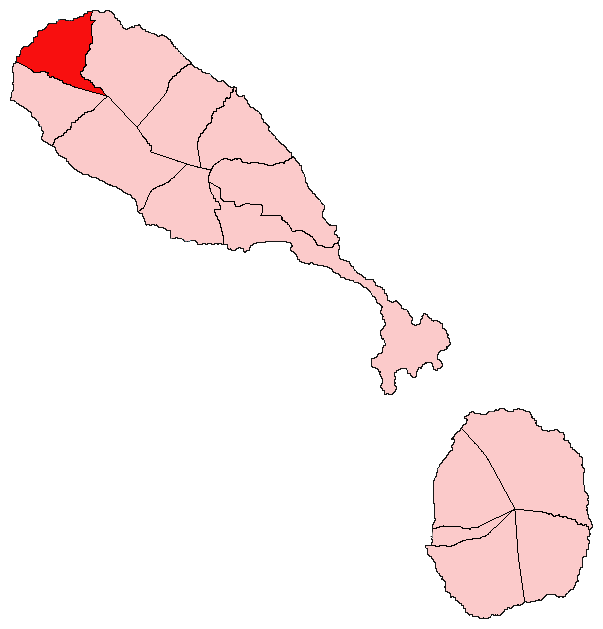
- Country: Saint Kitts and Nevis
- Capital: Saint Paul Capisterre

Area
  - Total: 14 km^{2} (5.4 sq mi)

Population (2011)
  - Total: 2,432
  - Density: 174/km^{2} (450/sq mi)

Saint Paul Capisterre is one of 14 administrative parishes that make up Saint Kitts and Nevis. It is the second smallest parish on St. Kitts, and third smallest in the federation. The parish capital is Saint Paul Capisterre Village.

== Land ==
The coastline of Saint Paul Capisterre is riddled with many small bays, with thin strands of stoney black volcanic sand. Sheer cliffs form an immediate backdrop to these beaches, lining the entire coast. The rough Atlantic Ocean pummels the shoreline, and thus all settlements in the parish are inland. Saint Paul Capisterre consists mostly of flat and gently sloping terrain, which is almost completely covered by abandoned sugar estates, with small farm holdings dotting in between. Further inland, where the terrain begins to rise sharply on the slopes of Mount Liamuiga, agricultural dominance gives way to lush tropical rain forests. This coupled with views of neighbouring Statia, Saba, St. Barths and St. Martin make it a very photogenic area.

== Villages ==
Capital – St. Paul Capisterre Village (St. Paul's)

Other Villages:

- Belmont Estate
- Cranston Estate
- Newton Ground

The parish consists of two large villages, Saint Paul Capisterre (St. Paul's) and Newton Ground, and their two subsidiary villages, Belmont Estate and Cranston Estate respectively. All settlements are inland. The village of St. Paul's is home to the former national leader, Dr. Denzil Llewellyn Douglas, and was also the hometown of the nation's first premier Robert Llewellyn Bradshaw.

== Economy ==
The parish of Saint Paul Capisterre is the most agricultural in the entire nation, its rich volcanic soils, gentle terrain and high rainfall all owing to its successes. The bulk of the population once toiled on the surrounding sugar cane estates, however, the local sugar industry was shut down in 2005, following plummeting world sugar prices and a growing national deficit. More residents from Saint Paul Capisterre were left unemployed than in any other parish. To ease the burden of unemployment, tracts of land have been leased and sold to former sugar workers and are now used to produce a wide variety of other produce.

Tourism is also an industry in the parish. Belmont Estate, whose name graces the local Belmont Estate rum, is of cultural significance; home of the legend of 'The Bull' in local folklore. It is also the start point for hikes for thrill seeking companies.

== Future developments ==
To ease the burden of unemployment in the parish, major plans are in the future to develop a large hotel / villa complex on the foothills of Mount Liamuiga near the village of Saint Paul's.
