= Nevis Peak =

Volcano in the Caribbean Sea

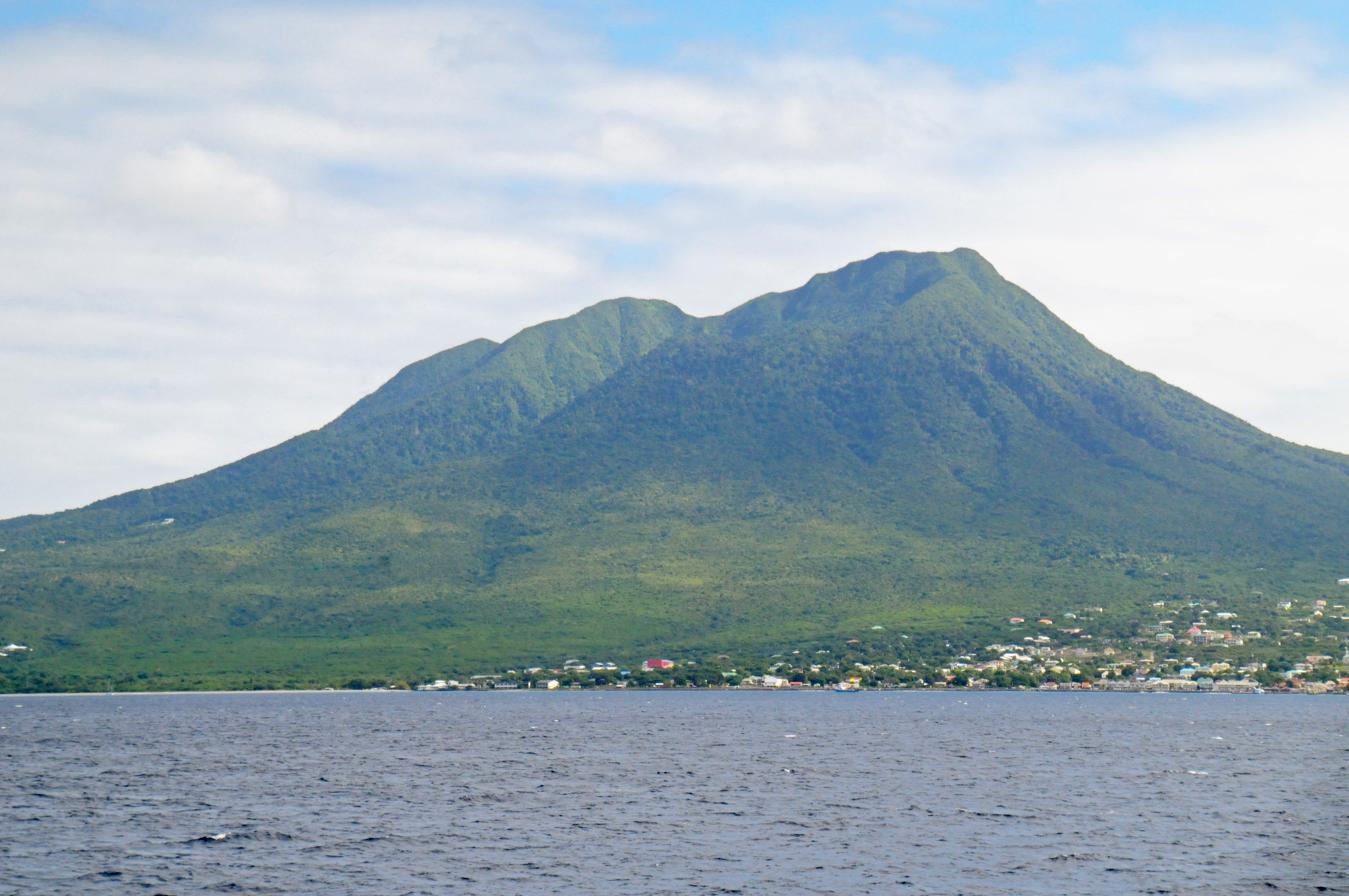
- Nevis Peak in December 2011

Highest point
- Elevation: 985 m (3,232 ft)
- Prominence: 985 m (3,232 ft)
- Listing: Volcanoes in Saint Kitts and Nevis
- Coordinates: 17°09′N 62°35′W

Geography
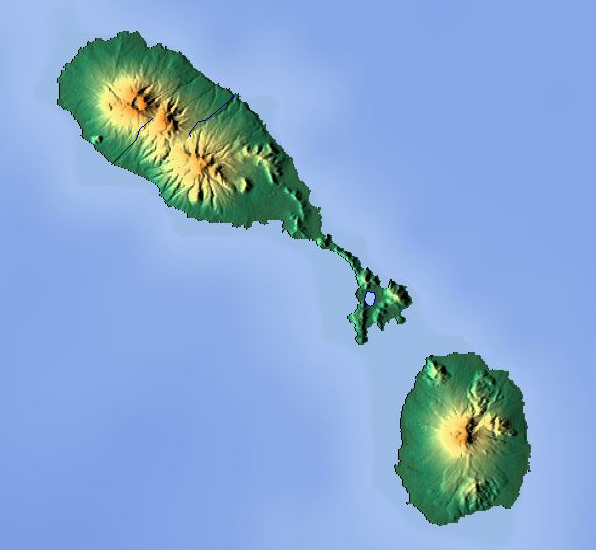
- Location within Saint Kitts and Nevis
- Location: Saint Kitts and Nevis

Geology
- Mountain type: Stratovolcano
- Volcanic arc: Lesser Antilles Volcanic Arc
- Last eruption: unknown

Nevis Peak is a potentially active volcano which is located in the centre of the island of Nevis of the Federation of Saint Kitts and Nevis in the West Indies. The stratovolcano rises to a height of 985 metres (3,232 ft) and is the highest point on the island. There have been no eruptions since prehistory, but there are active fumaroles and hot springs on the coastal slopes of the island, and these represent low-level volcanic activity.

The steeper parts of Nevis Peak are impossible to farm. During the height of the island's exploitation, when every available scrap of arable land was under sugar cane, the mountain, which occupies a large part of the island's interior, was never really changed in any way and therefore most of the original flora and fauna is still intact. At the lower levels of the mountain there is dry forest and humid forest, and then above that rain forest. At the top of the peak, which is covered with cloud most of the time, there is cloud forest, a montane habitat.

It is possible to hike to the top of the peak and back, but the route has some challenging sections. Hikers need to be quite physically fit to complete this route, and for safety's sake, it is necessary to go with a qualified guide. On days when the peak is completely free of clouds, there are views from the top of the mountain, not only of Nevis itself, but also out over the Atlantic Ocean, the Caribbean Sea, and the many surrounding islands of the Leeward Island chain.

The fauna of the mountain includes birds such as the red-necked pigeon and the bridled quail-dove, as well as many troops of the African green vervet monkey, which was introduced in the historical past and has become naturalized. The flora of Nevis Peak includes five different kinds of tree fern, some Heliconia species, and a number of small wild orchid species.

The five parishes of Nevis meet at the summit with a five corner point in its borders.
