= Tabernacle, Saint Kitts and Nevis =

Tabernacle
- Location in Saint Kitts and Nevis
- Coordinates: 17°23′N 062°47′W
- Country: Saint Kitts and Nevis
- Island: Saint Kitts
- Parish: Saint John Capisterre

Tabernacle is a small village on the northeast coast of the island of Saint Kitts, in Saint Kitts and Nevis.

It is the birthplace of the Saint Kitts and Nevis' former prime minister Timothy Harris.
