= Secretary of the Government =

Secretary of the Government or Cabinet Secretary is a senior government official in the executive branch. Positions include:

- Cabinet Secretary (Bangladesh)
- Cabinet Secretary (India)
- Cabinet Secretary (Pakistan)
- Cabinet Office Permanent Secretary in the United Kingdom
- Secretary of the Cabinet (New Zealand)
- Secretary of the Government (Israel)
- White House Cabinet Secretary in the United States

== See also ==
- Cabinet secretary
