= Ministerial Code =

Rules for UK government ministers

The Ministerial Code is a document setting out "rules" and standards for government ministers of the United Kingdom. Separate codes exist for ministers of the Scottish Government, the Northern Ireland Executive (based on the St Andrews Agreement) and the Welsh Government.

Such codes of conduct for ministers are amongst a range of initiatives designed to respond to perceptions of the erosion of ministerial ethics and accountability, and to preserve public trust in the institutions of cabinet government.

== History and status ==
Written guidance for British cabinet ministers began as the document Questions of Procedure for Ministers (QPM), which was a confidential document prepared by civil servants of the Cabinet Office to assist ministers, and dates to at least the 1980s.

The earliest published form of the Code is a result of the QPM's release, in 1992, by the Conservative Government led by John Major. Further editions have been based on suggestions and recommendations from the Committee on Standards in Public Life. The first edition to be entitled Ministerial Code was Tony Blair's 1997 set of rules. The convention has been that each new prime minister will issue their own version. The most recent version was released in November 2024, by new PM Sir Keir Starmer.

When Gordon Brown came into office in June 2007 he appointed Sir Philip Mawer, Parliamentary Commissioner for Standards, as the Independent Adviser on Ministers' Interests — a form of third party expert who could conduct investigations and give confidential advice. The Adviser under Tony Blair was the Comptroller and Auditor General, Sir John Bourn. The current Adviser is Sir Laurie Magnus; he was initially appointed by Conservatives PM Rishi Sunak and has remained in post under Labour's Sir Keir Starmer.

The Cabinet Secretary remains responsible for clearing ministers' financial matters.

The Code is currently administered by the Propriety and Ethics Team within the Cabinet Office.

The Code is periodically updated. The 2015 update, for example, removed the explicit requirement that ministers comply with international law and treaty obligations. Dave Penman, general secretary of the senior civil servants' trade union FDA, felt that Keir Starmer’s 2024 reforms to the ministerial code did not go far enough.

== Contents ==
The Code has ten sections, and several annexures. It also begins with a foreword from the prime minister.

=== Section 1 – Ministers of the Crown ===
This section is an introduction, setting out the role of ministers to the government, to Parliament, and to the people. It directs ministers to "behave in a way that upholds the highest standards of propriety," to uphold the principle of collective responsibility, and to avoid conflicts of interest. It says "It is of paramount importance that Ministers give accurate and truthful information to Parliament, correcting any inadvertent error at the earliest opportunity. Ministers who knowingly mislead Parliament will be expected to offer their resignation to the Prime Minister".

Ministers should recognise that as office-holders, they are held to the highest possible standards of proper conduct, and ensure that they are living up to those standards in their words and actions.

=== Section 2 – Ministers and the Government ===
Section 2, Ministers and the Government, sets out the precise rules of collective responsibility. It also states that ministers should relinquish all government material when ceasing to hold a role, and provides rules on access to government papers by former ministers (for example, those writing memoirs may wish to check the documents from their time in office). This set of rules is known as the "Radcliffe rules".

=== Section 3 – Ministers and Appointments ===
Sets out the rules regarding special advisers (temporary civil servants who are political advisers to ministers, based in ministers' offices), how many each minister may appoint, and their powers and duties. Also covered is the appointment of Parliamentary Private Secretaries (backbenchers who act as an unpaid secretary to the minister, to gain experience and credit with the party) — such appointments require written authority from the prime minister. PPSs are not members of the Government, but are expected to form part of the payroll vote, and support all government initiatives in the House of Commons.

The section states that where a minister is allocated an official residence, they must ensure that all personal tax liabilities, including any Council Tax, are properly discharged and that they personally pay such liabilities.

=== Section 4 – Ministers and Their Departments ===
Ministers and Their Departments describes the machinery of government (the structure of government departments and how responsibilities can be transferred), and how ministers should ensure that their work is covered during any absence from London, even for constituency business.

=== Section 5 – Ministers and Civil Servants ===
This section, Ministers and Civil Servants, regulates ministerial relationships with the Civil Service. It states that ministers "must uphold the political impartiality of the Civil Service, and not ask civil servants to act in any way which would conflict with the Civil Service Code."

=== Section 6 – Ministers' Constituency and Party Interests ===
Ministers' Constituency and Party Interests directs ministers to refrain from using government property and resources in their role as an MP. For example, the distribution of political leaflets must not be paid for with departmental/governmental funds. Ministers with a conflict of interest between their government role and their constituency role (for example, a transport minister may have to balance desires of his constituents to not have a new airport built near their town, with his government duties) are simply advised to act cautiously: "ministers are advised to take particular care."

=== Section 7 – Ministers' Private Interests ===
This section requires ministers to provide their Permanent Secretary, the civil servant in charge of their department of state, with a complete list of any financial interests they have. In March 2009, these lists were released to the public for the first time. A collated list is made available by the Cabinet Office. Officials sometimes need to restrict "interested" ministers' access to certain papers, to ensure impartiality.

Guidelines are set out as to maintaining neutrality for ministers who are members of a trade union. No minister should accept gifts or hospitality from any person or organisation when a conflict of interest could arise. A list of gifts, and how they were dealt with on an individual basis, is published annually.

=== Section 8 – Ministers and the Presentation of Policy ===
Speeches, interviews and news releases should all be cleared with the Number 10 Press Office, to ensure synchronicity of timing, and clarity of content. Ministers should not practice "regular journalism" without the permission of the Office. No minister may publish a book about their ministerial experiences while in office. Former ministers require manuscripts to be cleared by the Cabinet Secretary, under the "Radcliffe rules".

=== Section 9 – Ministers and Parliament ===
Ministers should not make oral statements to Parliament without prior approval from the prime minister. Any other minister or MP to be mentioned in such a statement should be notified beforehand.

=== Section 10 – Travel by Ministers ===
Official government transport, paid for by public funds, should normally only be used on government business, except where security requires that it be used even for personal transport. All travel should be cost-effective, and any trips abroad should be kept as small as possible. All overseas delegations costing more than £500 have their details published, annually. Members of the Cabinet have the authority to order special (non-scheduled) flights, but this power should only be used when necessary. In the event of a minister being summoned home on urgent government business, the cost of the round trip will be paid for from public funds. There are also rules relating to the use of official cars, and air miles gained by official travel.

=== Annex - The Seven Principles of Public Life ===
These principles were published by the Committee on Standards in Public Life in 1995.

- Selflessness: ministers should act entirely in the public interest.
- Integrity: no financial obligations should be accepted if they could undermine the minister's position.
- Objectivity: when making appointments, decisions should be based on merit.
- Accountability: all public office-holders are accountable, and should co-operate with all scrutiny procedures.
- Openness: all decisions should be justified, and information should be restricted only when necessary for the public interest.
- Honesty: public office-holders are required, by duty, to be honest in all their dealings and business.
- Leadership: the principles should be supported and upheld by leadership and example.

These principles have been restated and are seen as central by responsible government ministers and the Prime Minister.

=== Annex - Terms of reference for appointment of the Independent Advisor ===
These terms of reference for the appointment of the adjudicatory officer for the code, termed the Independent Advisor on Ministerial Standards, are also annexed to the latest version of the code.

=== Business Appointment Rules for Former Ministers ===
Ministers who have left office are prohibited from lobbying government for two years. They should also seek advice from the independent adviser to the PM regarding any employment they wish to take up within these two years of leaving office.

== Controversy ==
=== Blair government ===
It has been argued that, following a series of high-profile political scandals over the Code (David Blunkett resigned for a second time over a conflict of interest; and Tessa Jowell's husband was implicated – separately – in a furore over his financial dealings), that it should be administered by a more impartial figure than the prime minister. However, the prime minister remains the ultimate judge of whether or not a minister has breached the Code.

=== Johnson government ===
In February, 2020, Sir Philip Rutnam resigned as permanent secretary at the Home Office, causing the Cabinet Office to launch an inquiry into allegations of bullying by the Home Secretary, Priti Patel, and whether the Ministerial Code had been breached. Sir Alex Allan led the investigation in his role as the independent adviser on Ministers’ interests, which he had held since 2011. On 20 November 2020, he reported in his findings that the Home Secretary "had not consistently met the high standards expected of her under the Ministerial Code." Priti Patel issued an apology, but did not resign, and Boris Johnson did not call for her resignation. Alex Allan subsequently resigned as independent adviser, stating, "I recognise that it is for the prime minister to make a judgement on whether actions by a minister amount to a breach of the ministerial code."

On 28 April 2021, Johnson appointed Lord Geidt to succeed Allan as the Independent Adviser on Ministers' Interests.

On 28 May 2021, Geidt published a report on allegations surrounding the financing of refurbishments made to 11 Downing Street. The report concluded that Johnson did not breach the Ministerial Code and that no conflict of interest, or reasonably perceived conflict of interest, arose. However, Geidt expressed that it was "unwise" for Johnson to have proceeded with refurbishments without "more rigorous regard for how this would be funded". In December 2021 it was reported that Geidt was considering resigning his role as standards adviser because Johnson had withheld information from him during his inquiry into the flat refurbishment controversy. The Conservative Party was fined £17,800 for improperly declaring this donation. Nick Cohen commented in The Guardian that "Lord Geidt, Johnson's ministerial standards adviser, now cuts a pathetic figure. The credulous man actually believed the prime minister when he said he knew nothing about a businessman buddy, Lord Brownlow, paying for the refurbishment of his Downing Street flat until the media mentioned it in February 2021." On 12 January 2022, in the House of Commons, MP Chris Bryant described Lord Geidt's reputation as "tarnished" by his involvement with Johnson. In his annual report of May 2022, Geidt said that he had avoided offering unprompted advice to Boris Johnson about the latter's obligations under his own ministerial code because if it had been rejected, he would have had to resign.

On 15 June 2022, Geidt resigned from the role. The Scotsman said the reason for his resignation was that he was "tasked to offer a view about the Government's intention to consider measures which risk a deliberate and purposeful breach of the Ministerial Code". The Daily Telegraph said he "had finally resigned over a row with the prime minister over trade policy". BBC News said the resignation was due to a request for advice on a trade issue that had left him with no choice but to quit. Geidt maintained he was asked to advise this week on an issue he believed would be a deliberate breach of the ministerial code. Geidt wrote "This request has placed me in an impossible and odious position." He wrote the concept that the prime minister "might to any degree be in the business of deliberately breaching his own code is an affront" that would amount to suspending the code "to suit a political end. This would make a mockery not only of respect for the code but licence the suspension of its provisions in governing the conduct of Her Majesty's ministers. I can have no part in this."

== See also ==
- Minister of State
- Parliamentary Under-Secretary of State
- Parliamentary Private Secretary
- Committee on Standards in Public Life
- Cabinet collective responsibility
- Individual ministerial responsibility
- Special advisers in the United Kingdom
- John Bourn
- United Kingdom constitutional law
- Precedent book
