= Precedent book =

A precedent book is a document recording procedural, legal or constitutional precedents.

Such a book may have significant constitutional effects, such as the UK's Precedent Book (or Rule book), written by the Cabinet Office since 1977. Its archive files are subject to 30-year closure, unless otherwise stated.

== See also ==
- Ministerial code
