= 1982 Comorian parliamentary election =

Parliamentary elections were held in the Comoros on 7 March 1982, following the early dissolution of the Federal Assembly by President Ahmed Abdallah on 25 January. There were 38 constituencies (18 on Grande Comore, 15 on Anjouan and 5 on Mohéli), each of which elected a single member. In February the Comorian Union for Progress had been created as the sole legal party, and its candidates won 37 of the 38 seats.

Eighteen seats were won outright on election day, whilst a second round was held in the remaining 20 constituencies where no candidate won more than 50% of the vote on 14 March.

== Results ==
Party	Seats
Comorian Union for Progress	37
Independents	1
Total	38
Source: UCA
