= Comorian Union for Progress =

Political party in the Comoros

Comorian Union for Progress اتحاد جزر القمر من أجل التقدم Union Comorienne pour le Progrès Udzima
- Founded: 1982; 44 years ago
- Dissolved: 1996; 30 years ago
- Merged into: National Rally for Development
- Headquarters: Moroni
- Ideology: Nationalism

The Comorian Union for Progress (Comorian: Udzima, lit. Unity; French: Union Comorienne pour le Progrès, UCP) is a political party in the Comoros.

== History ==
In 1978, French mercenary Bob Denard staged a coup d'etat against the socialist government of Ali Soilih, bringing Ahmed Abdallah back to power. In February 1982, Abdallah banned all existing political parties and created the UCP. In subsequent elections a month later, the UCP won 37 of 38 seats in the National Assembly, with the other seat going to an independent. In the 1987 parliamentary elections the UCP won all 42 seats. Another coup by Denard in 1989 brought Said Mohamed Djohar, who was also part of the UCP.

Multi-party politics was introduced in 1990 and Djohar was elected President. However, Djohar renounced the party in 1991. The party boycotted the 1992 parliamentary elections in protest at the government's refusal to update the voter roll. However, it did contest the early elections the following year, winning two seats.

The party was dissolved in October 1996 when it merged into the National Rally for Development.

However, the party was later reformed, and contested the 2015 parliamentary elections, failing to win a seat. It nominated Said Ahmed Said Ali as its candidate for the 2016 presidential elections, but he failed to progress beyond the Grande Comore primary, only receiving 0.5% of the vote.

== Electoral history ==
=== Presidential elections ===
Election	Party candidate	Votes	%	Votes	%	Result
Election	Party candidate	First Round		Second Round		Result
1984	Ahmed Abdallah		99.4%			Elected ✓
1990	Said Mohamed Djohar	44,845	23.1%	103,000	55.1%	Elected ✓
1996	Omar Tamou		13.3%			Lost ✗
1996	Mtara Maécha		38.7%			Lost ✗
2016	Said Ahmed Said Ali	573	0.52%			Lost ✗

=== Assembly elections ===
Election	Votes	%	Seats	+/–	Position	Result
1982			37 / 37	▲37	▲1st	Sole legal party
1987			42 / 42	▲5	1st	Sole legal party
1992	Boycotted		0 / 42	▼42		Extra-parliamentary
1993			2 / 42	▲2	▲5th	Opposition
2015	2,713	1.51%	0 / 24	Steady	▲10th	Extra-parliamentary
