= 1987 Comorian parliamentary election =

Parliamentary elections were held in the Comoros on 22 March 1987. The result was a victory for the Comorian Union for Progress, the sole legal party, which won all 42 seats in the first round of voting. Voter turnout was around 65%.

== Electoral system ==
There were 42 constituencies (increased from 38), each of which elected a single member: 20 on Grande Comore, 16 on Anjouan and 6 on Mohéli.

== Results ==
Party	Seats	+/–
Comorian Union for Progress	42	+5
Others	0	–1
Total	42	+4
Source: IPU
