= French settlement in Saint Kitts and Nevis =

The French settlement of St. Kitts and Nevis started in the early seventeenth century. Throughout its history on Saint Kitts until the eighteenth century, France had frequent clashes with the English for the occupation of the island, until its final defeat in 1782, which definitely gave the island to the British. Today, the descendants of French make up a portion of the white population of the archipelago.

== History ==
In 1625, a French captain, Pierre Belain d'Esnambuc, arrived on the island. He had left France hoping to establish an island colony after hearing about the success of the English on Saint Kitts, but his fleet was destroyed in a clash with the Spanish army, leaving him with only his flagship. Warner took pity on the French settlers and allowed them to settle on the island as well, thus making Saint Kitts the site of the first permanent French colony in the Caribbean as well. French settlers lodged themselves in the ruins of the town of Dieppe, which they rebuilt. Warner also willingly accepted the French in an attempt to out-populate the local Kalinago, of whom he was growing suspicious. So, the British and French briefly united to massacre the local Kalinago (preempting a Kalinago plan to massacre the Europeans), and then partitioned the island, with the English in the middle and the French on either end. The Spanish for their part also considered endorsed these islands since Christopher Columbus discovered (as he signed a treaty with the Spanish crown in the late fifteenth century, all the places he discovered from that time were for Spain), which prompted them to send a Spanish force to clear the islands of the area of foreign settlement seized St. Kitts, to quickly occupy the two islands of the archipelago and deport those early English and French settlers in 1629, during the Anglo-Spanish war of 1625. However, following the peace treaty between England and Spain in 1630, the Spanish permitted the re-establishment of the English and French colonies. So, France and Great Britain have reoccupied the archipelago.

On May 13, 1627, and until July 16, 1702, the Island of St. Kitts was divided into separate English (Center) and France's Saint-Christopher. During those years, the island was occupied by British and French often. However, during the Second Anglo-Dutch War (4 March 1665 – 31 July 1667), the relationship between the French and English settlers soured, as their home countries warred. So, warfare soon broke out on the island itself and the overwhelming French troops attacked the English settlements and gained control of the whole island from 1665 to 1667. The Treaty of Breda restored the English portion of the island to its owners.

In 1689, during the War of the Grand Alliance, France re-occupied the entire island, and decimated the English farms. An English retaliation by General Codrington defeated the French forces and deported them to Martinique. The Treaty of Rijswijk in 1697 restored pre-war conditions. The war devastated St. Kitts's economy.

On 16 July 1702 the British annexed the French side of the island, but in 1705 the French made one more major attack on English troops during the War of the Spanish Succession, as the over 8,000 French troops on the island easily defeated the 1,000 English posts. In addition, a heavy French raid in 1706 also damaged the island's agriculture extensively. The French held St. Kitts for eight years, until the Treaty of Utrecht was signed (1713). This treaty did return, on April 11, 1713, the island to England. However, between February 12, 1782, and September 3, 1783, it was occupied by France again.

The last war developed between the two powers, ending with the British victory over the French at Brimstone Hill in 1783. After this, the islands came under British control until independence in 1983.
