= 1984 Comorian presidential election =

Re-election of Ahmed Abdallah

- 30 September 1984
Nominee	Ahmed Abdallah
Party	UCP
Percentage	99.4%
President before election
Ahmed Abdallah
UCP
Elected President
Ahmed Abdallah
UCP

Presidential elections were held in the Comoros on 30 September 1984. Incumbent President Ahmed Abdallah of the Comorian Union for Progress (the sole legal party) was the only candidate, and received the support of 99.4% of voters.

== Results ==
Candidate	Party	Votes	%
Ahmed Abdallah	Comorian Union for Progress		99.4
Against			0.6
Total			
Source: African Elections Database
