= Saint Paul Capisterre =

- Location in Saint Kitts and Nevis
- Coordinates: 17°23′55″N 062°49′26″W
- Country: Saint Kitts and Nevis
- Island: Saint Kitts
- Parish: Saint Paul Capisterre

Saint Paul Capisterre (known locally as Saint Paul's) is a town in Saint Paul Capisterre Parish on the island of Saint Kitts in Saint Kitts and Nevis. It is the largest town in the Capisterre region of Saint Kitts.

Its population is estimated at 1,196.

== History ==
The town was a major source of labour for the Saint Kitts sugar cane industry, in which most of the villagers were formerly employed. Following the closure of the sugar mills, the town was hit with a large unemployment dilemma. Many employment programmes were started by the government.

== Notable residents ==
Saint Paul Capisterre is home to the former prime minister of Saint Kitts and Nevis, Denzil Douglas. It was also home to a former premier, Robert Llewellyn Bradshaw, who is the first National Hero of Saint Kitts.
