= Capisterre =

Region on the Island of Saint Kitts

Coordinates: 17°23′N 62°49′W

Capisterre (a corruption of the original French name Capesterre) is a region covering the Northern Coastal plain on the Island of Saint Kitts, along the Caribbean. It was originally colonized by the French in the early 17th century, with its capital on the only harbour, in the fishing town of Dieppe. The area was lost to the British in 1713. Significant numbers of French immigrants from the neighbouring island of Saint Barths came to Capisterre in the early 20th century, and became infamous for their illegal moonshine trade.

The region is home to the community festival La Festival de Capisterre which takes place every September during the week of Saint Kitts and Nevis independence (September 19th).
