= Mount Liamuiga =

Mountain in Saint Kitts and Nevis

- Mount Liamuiga in December 2024

Highest point
- Elevation: 1,156 m (3,793 ft)
- Prominence: 1,156 m (3,793 ft)
- Listing: Ribu; North America isolated peak 107th; Country high point
- Coordinates: 17°22′N 62°48′W

Geography
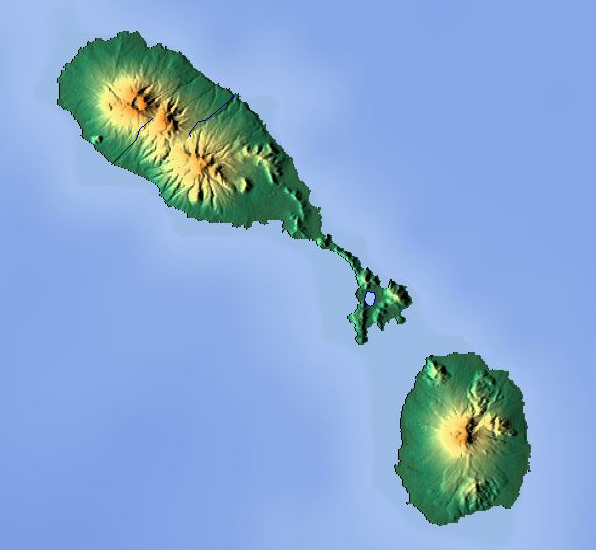
- Location within Saint Kitts and Nevis
- Location: Saint Kitts

Geology
- Mountain type: Stratovolcano
- Last eruption: 160 CE ± 200 years

Mount Liamuiga is a 1,156-metre (3,792 ft) stratovolcano which forms the north-western part of the island of Saint Kitts. The peak is the highest point on the island of Saint Kitts, in the federation of Saint Kitts and Nevis, and in the entire British Leeward Islands, as well as one of the tallest peaks in the eastern Caribbean archipelago. The peak is topped by a 1-kilometre (0.6 mi) wide summit crater, which contained a shallow crater lake until 1959. As of 2006, the crater lake had re-formed. The last verified eruptions from the volcano were about 1,800 years ago, while reports of possible eruptions in 1692 and 1843 are considered uncertain.

Mount Liamuiga was formerly named Mount Misery. The renaming took place on the date of St. Kitts' independence, September 19, 1983. However, many older citizens still refer to it as Mount Misery. The name Liamuiga is derived from the Kalinago name for the entire island of St. Kitts, which means, "fertile land."

The mountainsides are covered in farmland and small villages up to a height of 460 metres (1,500 ft), after which lush tropical rainforests drape the slopes until cloud forest takes over at 900 m (3,000 ft). The mountain can be hiked, with the trailhead starting approximately 2 miles north-west-west of the crater. The trail does not reach the highest point, but stops on the western edge of the crater.

== See also ==
- List of volcanoes in Saint Kitts and Nevis
