= List of Comorian coups d'état =

List of coups d'état in the Comoros

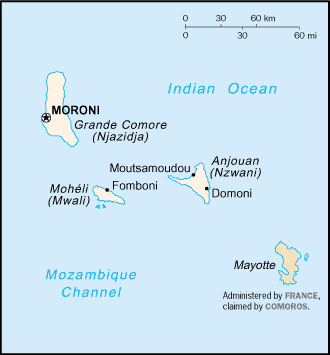
A CIA WFB map of the Comoro Islands, depicting the independent country of the Comoros and the French overseas territory of Mayotte (claimed by the Comoros).

This article lists successful and failed coups d'état that have taken place in the Comoros since 1975:

== 1970s ==
- 3 August 1975: President Ahmed Abdallah was overthrown by Said Mohamed Jaffar and French mercenary Bob Denard.
- 2 January 1976: President Said Mohamed Jaffar was overthrown by Ali Soilih and Bob Denard, resulting in Jaffar's exile.
- 13 May 1978: President Ali Soilih was overthrown by Ahmed Abdallah and Bob Denard, resulting in his killing thirteen days later; Denard became the commander of Abdallah's 500-strong Presidential Guard for the next eleven years (1978–1989).

== 1980s ==
- 26 November 1989: President Ahmed Abdallah was overthrown by Said Mohamed Djohar and Bob Denard, resulting in his assassination. Under French pressure, Denard and other mercenaries left the country the next month.

== 1990s ==
- 28 September 1995 (Operation Kaskari): President Said Mohamed Djohar was overthrown by Bob Denard, who returned to the country with a force of 33 hand-picked mercenaries; it was the last coup staged with Denard's involvement. The coup resulted in the French military intervention (Operation Azalee) days later, and the removal of Denard from the country.
- 30 April 1999: President Tadjidine Ben Said Massounde was overthrown by Colonel Azali Assoumani of the Comorian Armed Forces.

== 2010s ==
- 20 April 2013: President Ikililou Dhoinine's government foiled a coup attempt.

== See also ==
- History of the Comoros
