= Umodja Wa Massiwa =

National anthem of the Comoros

Umodja wa Massiwa
English: The Union of the Islands
- National anthem of the Comoros
- Also known as: Udzima wa ya Masiwa (English: The Union of the Great Islands)
- Lyrics: Said Hachim Sidi Abderemane
- Music: Said Hachim Sidi Abderemane and Kamildine Abdallah
- Adopted: 1978; 48 years ago
- Preceded by: "Ungwana"

Audio sample
- "Udzima wa ya Masiwa" played by the US Navy Band (instrumental): file; help

"Umodja wa Massiwa" (Comorian for "The Union of the Islands") is the national anthem of the Comoros. Adopted in 1978, it was written by Said Hachim Sidi Abderemane, who also composed the music with Kamildine Abdallah.

The spelling of the title is inconsistent. In the 1978 Constitution, it was written "Ouzima wa Massiwa"; in 1992, "Udzima Wa Masiwa"; and in 2001, "Umodja Wa Masiwa". Currently, with the revisions of 2009 and 2013, it is written: "Umodja Wa Massiwa".

== History ==
The anthem replaced a previous anthem titled "Ungwana" ("Liberty"), also known as "Comor Masiwa Mane" ("Four Comorian Islands"), adopted in 1976 under the Ali Soilih administration following a competition won by writer and musician Abou Chihabi. It was used until 1978, when a coup by Ahmed Abdallah and Bob Denard took place.

Mayotte, while claimed by the Comoros but under French administration, is also mentioned in the song.

== Lyrics ==
Comorian lyrics

Beramu isi (Note: Sometimes written itsi ([i.t͡si]).) pepeza
I nadi ukombozi piya
Ye daula ivenuha
Hasibabu (Note: Sometimes written tasiba bu ([ta.si.ba bu]) or tsa sibabu ([t͡sa si.ba.bu]).) yahe dini voya tsangaya hunu Komoriya
Narikeni yamahaba (Note: Sometimes written na mahaba ([na ma.ha.ba]).) ya huvendza ya masiwa yatru

Wasiwa Komoro (Note: Sometimes written Komori ([ko.mo.ri]).) damu ndzima
Wasiwa Komoro dini ndzima
Ya masiwa razaliwa (Note: Sometimes written radzali wa ([ra.d͡za.li wa]).)
Ya masiwa yarileya
Mola nde yari sayidiya
Narike niya ndzima (Note: Sometimes written Narikéni ha niya ([na.ri.ke.ni ha ni.ja]).)
Rivendze uwatwaniya
Mahaba ya dini na duniya.

Beramu isi pepeza
Rangu mwezi sita wa Juiye
Ye daula ivenuha
Zisiwa zatru zi katruha (Note: Sometimes written pangwi ha ([pa.ᵑɡʷi ha]).)
Maoré na Ndzuani, Mwali na Ngazidja
Narikeni yamahaba ya huvendza ya masiwa.

IPA transcription (Note: See Help:IPA and Comorian languages § Phonology.)

[be.ra.mu i.si pe.pe.za]
[i na.di u.ko.ᵐbo.zi pi.ja]
[(j)e da.u.la i.ve.nu.ha]
[ha.si.ba.bu ja.he di.ni vo.ja t͡sa.ᵑɡa.ja hu.nu ko.mo.ri.ja]
[na.ri.ke.ni ja.ma.ha.ba ja hu.ve.ⁿd͡za ja ma.si.wa ja.t͡ʃu]

[wa.si.wa ko.mo.ro da.mu ⁿd͡zi.ma]
[wa.si.wa ko.mo.ro di.ni ⁿd͡zi.ma]
[ja ma.si.wa ra.za.li.wa]
[ja ma.si.wa ja.ri.le.ja]
[mo.la ⁿde ja.ri sa.ji.di.ja]
[na.ri.ke ni.ja ⁿd͡zi.ma]
[ri.ve.ⁿd͡ze‿u.wa.twa.ni.ja]
[ma.ha.ba ja din(i) na du.ni.ja]

[be.ra.mu i.si pe.pe.za]
[ra.ᵑɡu mʷe.zi si.ta wa ʒɥi.je]
[(j)e da.u.la i.ve.nu.ha]
[zi.si.wa za.t͡ʃu zi ka.t͡ʃu.ha]
[ma.o.re na ⁿd͡zu.a.ni m.wa.li na ᵑɡa.zi.d͡ʒa]
[na.ri.ke.ni ja.ma.ha.ba ja hu.ve.ⁿd͡za ja ma.si.wa]

French lyrics

Au faîte le Drapeau flotte
Apelle à la Liberté totale.
La nation apparaît,
Force d'une même religion au sein des Comores.
Vivons dans l'amour réciproque dans nos îles.

Les Comoriens issus de même sang,
Nous embrassons la même idéologie religieuse.
Les îles où nous somme nés !
Les îles qui nous ont prodigué la bonne éducation.
Dieu y a apporté son aide.
Conservons notre unité pour l'amour le patrie,
Amour pour la religion
Et pour l'évolution.

Au faîte le Drapeau flotte
Depuis le 6 du mois de juillet
La nation apparaît,
Les îles devenues souveraines;
Maore - N'Dzouani - Mouwali - et N'Gazidja.
Gardons notre amour pour les îles.

Arabic lyrics

العلم يرفرف
ليعلن الإستقلال التام
ترتقي الأمة
بسبب إيماننا في جزرنا القمرية
دعنا نتحلى بالإخلاص لحب جزرنا العظيمة

نحن القمريون من دم ٍ واحد
نحن القمريون من إيمانٍ واحد
على هذه الجزر قد ولدنا
هذه الجزر قد رعتنا
نرجوا من الله مساعدتنا دائماً

لحب أرضنا الأم
ولحب ديننا والعالم

العلم يرفرف
من السادس من يوليو
ترتقي الأمة
جزرنا موحدة
ماوري وأنزون موهيلي والقمر
دعنا نتحلى بالإخلاص لحب جزرنا العظيمة

English translation

The flag is flying,
Announcing total independence;
The nation rises up
Because of the faith we have in our Comoros.
Let us always have devotion to love our Great Islands.

We Comorians are of one blood,
We Comorians are of one faith.
On these Islands we were born,
These Islands brought us up.
May God always help us;
Let us always have the firm resolve
To love our fatherland,
Love our religion and the world.

The flag is flying.
From the Sixth of July
The Nation rises up;
Our Islands are lined up.
Mayotte and Anjouan, Moheli and N'Gazidja,
Let us always have devotion to love our Great Islands.
