= State of the Comoros =

Period of Comorian History from 1975 to 1978

Comorian State: État comorien (French)
- 1975–1978
- Top: Flag (1975); Bottom: Flag (1975–1978) Coat of arms
- Anthem: Ungwana (Comorian); Liberty
- Location of the Comoros (circled)
- Capital: Moroni
- Official languages: French, Comorian, Arabic
- Religion: State atheism
- Demonym: Comorian
- Government: Federal communist state under a dictatorship
- President
  - 1975: Ahmed Abdallah
  - 1975–1976: Said Mohamed Jaffar
  - 1976–1978: Ali Soilih
  - 1978: Said Atthoumani
- Vice President
  - 1976–1978: Mohamed Hassanaly
- History
  - Establishment of the Comorian State: 6 July 1975
  - Disestablishment of the Comorian State: 23 May 1978
- ISO 3166 code: KM
Preceded by	Succeeded by
Territory of the Comoros	Federal Islamic Republic of the Comoros
- Today part of: Comoros

Socialist Comoros, officially the Comorian State, was a communist state between 1975 and 1978 under the rule of the Democratic Rally of the Comorian People. This period began on August 3, 1975, less than a month after Comoros gained independence from France, when Ali Soilih and Said Mohamed Jaffar, whose adherents were barely armed, hired French mercenary Bob Denard to overthrow Ahmed Abdallah. Soilih officially became President of the revolutionary council in January 1976. He acquired extensive powers under the terms of a new constitution and implemented socialist economic policies. This period would formally come to an end when Soilih was ousted and killed in a coup by French mercenaries, which reinstalled the former President Ahmed Abdallah.

== History ==
=== Overthrow of Abdallah ===
On 3 August 1975 the United National Front coalition overthrew the government of Ahmed Abdallah, with the aid of foreign mercenaries led by Bob Denard.

Said Mohamed Jaffar favored a conciliatory approach towards France and the Mayotte issue. On the occasion of the acceptance of the Comorian State (État comorien) at the United Nations in November 1975 Said Mohamed Jaffar delivered a speech. In January 1976 Jaffar gave up power to radical leftist leader Ali Soilih.

=== Soilih's dictatorship ===
After rising to power in 1976, Soilih embarked on a revolutionary program that was mainly directed against the country's traditional and conservative Muslim society. His vision, based on a mixture of Maoism and Islamic philosophies, was to develop the Comoros as an economically self-sufficient and ideologically progressive modern 20th-century state.

Condemned as wasteful backwards and cumbersome, certain inherited customs of Comorian culture were abolished, like the 'Anda', the traditional "grand marriage", as well as traditional funerary ceremonies, which were criticized for being too costly. Soilih advanced the cause of the youth by allowing young people to take more power. In order to reach his goal, he lowered the voting age to fourteen and put teenagers in positions of responsibility. Among the most striking of his reforms were measures designed to gain the favor of the youth, like the legalization of cannabis and promoting the removal of the veil among the women of Comoros. Most civil servants were dismissed and there was a ban on some Islamic customs. He implemented revolutionary social reforms such as replacing French with Shikomoro, burning down the national archives and nationalizing land.

Logo of the Moissy or "Jeunesse Révolutionnaire".

Soilih created the 'Moissy', a young revolutionary militia trained by Tanzanian military advisers. The Moissy was the Comorian answer to Mao Zedong's Red Guards, and its methods were similar to those that had been employed by their Chinese counterpart during the Cultural Revolution.

=== Consequences ===
Soilih's confrontational policies led to France breaking ties and terminating all aid and technical assistance programs to the Comoros, while traditional leaders of the islands resented the progressive elimination of age-old traditions, all this would lead the Comoros into becoming a pariah state. Growing discontent promoted by the political opposition resulted in four unsuccessful coup attempts against the Soilih regime during its two-and-a-half-year existence.

== 1978 overthrow and killing of Soilih ==
On 13 May 1978, Bob Denard, once again commissioned by the French intelligence service (SDECE), returned to overthrow Soilih and reinstate Abdallah with the support of the French, Rhodesian and South African governments. Soilih was overthrown by a force of 50 mercenaries, the majority of them former French paratroopers hired by exiled former leader Ahmed Abdallah and led by French Colonel Bob Denard. Abdallah became president ending Soilih's 2 year rule, Soilih's policies were reversed, and the name of the country was changed to "Islamic Federal Republic of the Comoros". On May 29, Soilih was shot and killed; according to the government, he had attempted to escape from house arrest. Soilih died at the age of 41 years old.

== Foreign policy ==
Soilih, in addition to implementing radical reforms, established close connections with many of the Cold War states which aided revolutionary movements. Among these were North Korea, which established an embassy in the Comoros within a year. On 18 January 1977, the first ambassador So Jinyong presented his credentials to Vice President Mohamed Hassan Ali, and made a visit to President Soilih. On 15 March 1978, the North Korean ambassador presented a gift from Kim Il Sung to President Soilih, in response to which the Comoros expressed its "full support and firm solidarity with the Korean people's struggle" to achieve an independent and peaceful Korean reunification.

Soilih's Moissy militia and other armed forces received training from the left-wing Tanzanian regime of Julius Nyerere, the Moissy also received some degree of aid from the North Koreans.

Soilih's Comoros would also receive support from Egypt, Iraq, and the Sudan.

== Legacy ==
10 years later, in 1989, Soilih's older half-brother, Said Mohamed Djohar, overthrew Abdallah's Regime, possibly with the help of Denard. He served as president of the Comoros until 1996.

The effects of the social policies of Ali Soilih's dictatorship are still apparent throughout the Comoros, particularly on Anjouan.

== See also ==
- African socialism
- Islamic socialism
- List of socialist states
