= 1974 Comorian independence referendum =

- 22 December 1974
- Do you want the Comoros' territory to become independent?

Results
Choice	Votes	%
Yes	154,184	94.57%
No	8,853	5.43%
Valid votes	163,037	99.92%
Invalid or blank votes	130	0.08%
Total votes	163,167	100.00%
Registered voters/turnout	174,918	93.28%
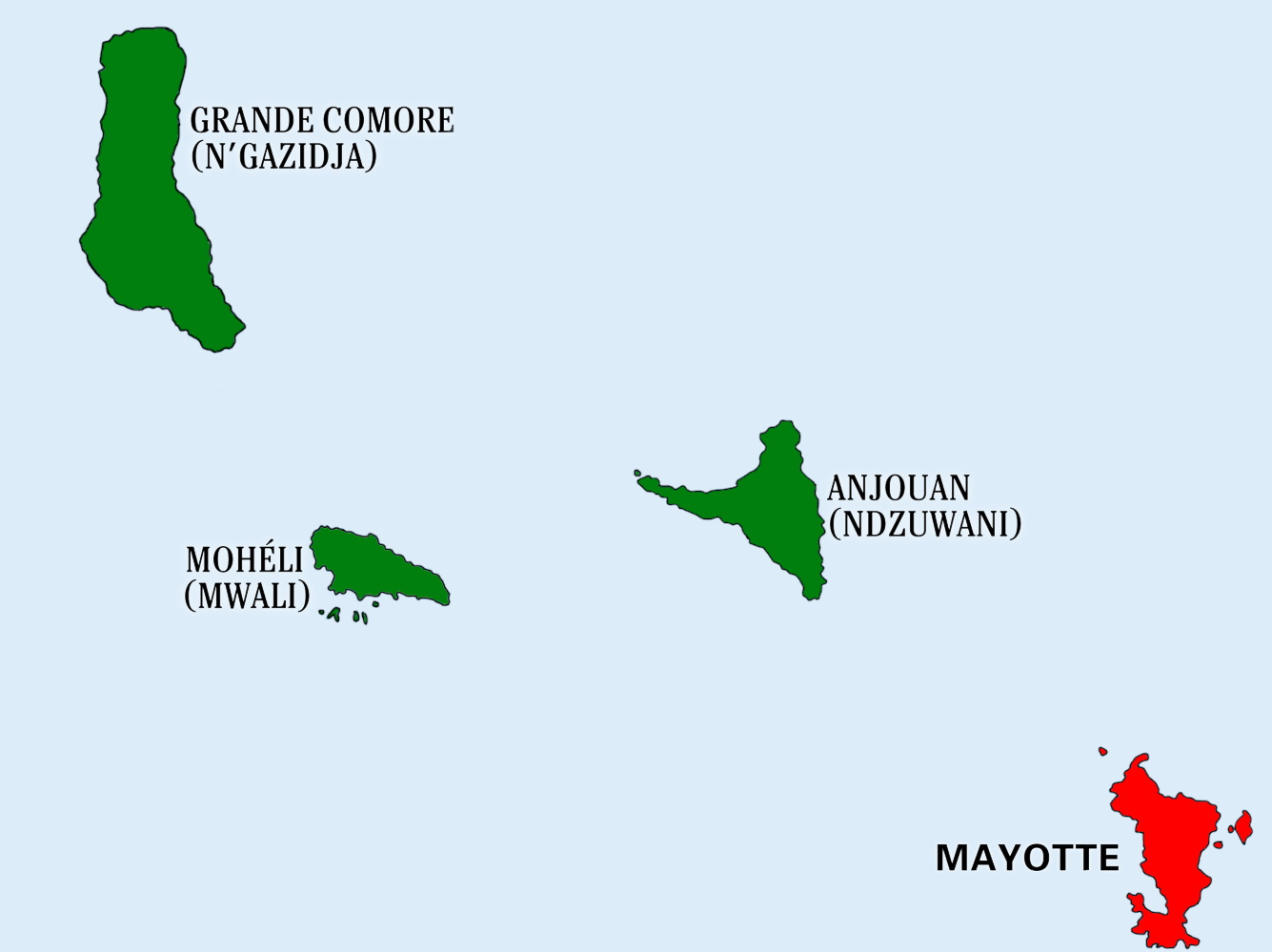
- Results by island

An independence referendum was held in the Comoros on 22 December 1974. The overall result was a strong "yes" vote, with 94.57% of voters voting for independence and almost all the "no" votes being cast in Mayotte, where there was a majority for remaining under French control. In contrast, on Mohéli only five out of 6,059 votes were against independence. Voter turnout was 93.3%.

Following the referendum, the country declared independence on 6 July 1975, with Mayotte remaining under French control.

== Background ==
The Comoros had achieved autonomy in 1961, and public satisfaction with the new arrangement meant that the islands had not been part of the decolonisation that saw most of France's African territories become independent in the 1960s. However, public support for independence began to grow in the early 1970s, except in Mayotte, where support for retaining French sovereignty remained strong.

A treaty was signed on 15 June 1973, allowing for the islands to become independent within five years following a consultation with the residents. The French government approved the treaty on 2 October, opting for a single referendum for the whole colony rather than an island-by-island vote. The approach was criticised in Mayotte, where Marcel Henry, leader of the anti-independence Mahoré People's Movement, claimed Mayotte residents had a right to self-determination based on article 53 of the French Constitution, which states that secession cannot happen without the consent of voters.

When the National Assembly approved the treaty in November 1973, it made an amendment that required Mayotte to be given regional autonomy if independence were to be achieved. In November 1974 law 74–965 was passed, requiring the holding of a referendum in the Comoros within six months, but also allowing a six-month period following the results to decide on its reaction to them.

== Results ==
« Souhaitez-vous que le territoire des Comores devienne indépendant ?»

Do you want the Comoros' territory to become independent?

Island	For		Against		Invalid votes	Total votes	Registered voters	Voter turnout
Island	Votes	%	Votes	%	Invalid votes	Total votes	Registered voters	Voter turnout
Anjouan	58,897	99.93	44	0.07	4	58,945	61,406	95.99
Grande Comore	84,123	99.98	21	0.02	39	84,183	89,215	94.36
Mayotte	5,110	36.78	8,783	63.22	84	13,977	17,946	77.88
Mohéli	6,054	99.92	5	0.08	3	6,062	6,351	95.45
Total	154,184	94.57	8,853	5.43	130	163,167	174,918	93.28
Source: African Elections Database

== Aftermath ==
Following the referendum, President Ahmed Abdallah announced that the Comorian Chamber of Deputies would draw up a new constitution, and that independence would be declared in agreement with the French government. The result in Mayotte led the French government to try to convince their Comorian counterparts that a new constitution should allow the island autonomy from the rest of the country. However, Abdallah stated that he was against a federal state. He rejected a draft constitution on 11 April 1975 on the basis that it allowed for too much decentralisation.

On 3 July 1975 the French National Assembly approved a new law on Comorian independence, with the second article stating that the new constitution should be approved individually by each island. If an island rejected the new constitution, a new one would have to be presented in three months. If any island rejected the second draft, they would not be subject to it. However, the Comorian government rejected the French law, with Abdallah's Oudzima party declaring that "The Comoro people disapprove of interference by the French Parliament in the internal affairs of the future Comoros state, condemn all manoeuvres to balkanise the Comoros, and consequently reject the provisions of the act of 30 June 1975."

On 6 July the Comorian Chamber of Deputies unilaterally declared independence of the entire Comoros archipelago. The French government recognised the independence of Grande Comore, Anjouan and Mohéli on 31 December 1975, but did not mention Mayotte. A referendum was subsequently held in Mayotte in February 1976 on remaining part of the Comoros, with the proposal rejected by over 99% of voters; the voter turnout was observed to be 83.34%, and the number of registered voters had increased to 21,671.
