= Ungwana =

National anthem of the Comoros

English: Liberty
- National anthem of the State of the Comoros
- Also known as: Comor Masiwa Mane (English: Four Comorian Islands)
- Lyrics: Abou Chihabi
- Music: Abou Chihabi
- Adopted: 1975/1976
- Relinquished: 1978
- Succeeded by: "Udzima wa ya Masiwa"

Audio sample
- file; help

"Ungwana" ("Liberty"), also known as "Comor Masiwa Mane" ("Four Comorian Islands"), was the national anthem of the State of the Comoros from 1975 or 1976 to 1978, when a coup by Ahmed Abdallah and Bob Denard took place, and it was replaced by the current anthem, "Udzima wa ya Masiwa". It was written and composed by Abdérémane Chihabiddine, better known as Abou Chihabi, a musician with the Comorian folk band Folkomor Océan. It was adopted under the Ali Soilih administration following a competition won by Chihabi.

Mayotte (claimed by the Comoros but under French administration) is also mentioned in the song.

== Lyrics ==
Comorian original

Chorus:
Ungwana ngazi nuo
Si wakomori masiwa manne
Maore Ndzuwani
Mwali Ngazidja
Hazi piya ngasi nizo
Rangu zamani
Dima ulozi
Hazi za mihono

I
𝄆 Zinu harumwa mutsanganyiho
Wa niya za hatru 𝄇
Ridjitoa fidiya
Riwanie mipaka ya Komori
Dayima ngasi tiyari
Si wanantsi wa Komori
Lazima ritre zedamu
Isipoteye

Chorus

II
𝄆 Shababi risihana piya
Waume na washe 𝄇
Ndo maesha ya usoni
Ya hatru si wanantsi wa Komori

IPA transcription (Note: See Help:IPA and Comorian languages § Phonology.)

[u.ᵑɡʷa.na ᵑɡa.zi nu.o]
[si wa.ko.mo.ri ma.si.wa ma.ne]
[ma.o.re ⁿd͡zu.wa.ni]
[m.wa.li ᵑɡa.zi.d͡ʒa]
[ha.zi pi.ja ᵑɡa.si ni.zo]
[ra.ᵑɡu za.ma.ni]
[di.ma u.lo.zi]
[ha.zi za mi.ho.no]

1
𝄆 [zi.nu ha.ru.mʷa mu.t͡sa.ᵑɡa.ɲi.ho]
[wa ni.ja za ha.t͡ʃu] 𝄇
[ri.d͡ʒi.to.a fi.di.ja]
[ri.wa.ni.e mi.pa.ka ja ko.mo.ri]
[da.ji.ma ᵑɡa.s(i) ti.ja.ri]
[si wa.na.ⁿt͡si wa ko.mo.ri]
[la.zi.ma ri.t͡ʃe ze.da.mu]
[i.si.po.te.je]

2
𝄆 [ʃa.ba.bi ri.si.ha.na pi.ja]
[wa.u.me na wa.ʃe] 𝄇
[ⁿdo ma.e.ʃa ja u.so.ni]
[ja ha.t͡ʃu si wa.na.ⁿt͡si wa ko.mo.ri]

French translation

Refrain:
La liberté nous l'avons
Nous les Comoriens des quatre îles
Mayotte, Anjouan
Mohéli et Grande Comore.
Nous accomplissons toutes les tâches
Depuis longtemps.
L'agriculture, la pêche,
Les travaux manuels.

I
𝄆 Nous les réalisons dans l'union
De nos esprits. 𝄇
Nous sacrifions nos vies
Pour défendre l'intégrité des Comores.
Nous sommes toujours prêts,
Nous les citoyens des Comores,
S'il faut que nous versions notre sang
Pour sauver notre pays.

Refrain

II
𝄆 Toute la jeunesse est solidaire,
Garçons et filles. 𝄇
C'est la vie dans le progrès
Pour nous, citoyens des Comores.

Arabic translation

جوقة:
الحرية لدينا
نحن جزر القمر الأربعة
مايوت، أنجوان
موهيلي وقمر الكبرى.
لقد أنجزنا جميع المهام
لوقت طويل.
الزراعة والصيد
عمل يدوي.

١
𝄆 ندركها في الاتحاد
من عقولنا. 𝄇
نحن نضحي بحياتنا
للدفاع عن سلامة جزر القمر.
نحن دائما جاهزون،
نحن مواطني جزر القمر،
إذا كان علينا أن سفك دماءنا
لإنقاذ بلادنا.

جوقة

٢
𝄆 كل الشباب متحدون،
بنين وبنات. 𝄇
إنها الحياة في التقدم
بالنسبة لنا، مواطني جزر القمر.

English translation

Chorus:
Freedom, we have it
We, the Comorians of four islands
Mayotte, Anjouan
Mohéli and Grande Comore.
We've been accomplishing all the tasks
For a long time.
Agriculture, fishing,
Manual labour.

I
𝄆 We realise them in the union
of our minds. 𝄇
We sacrifice our lives
To defend the integrity of the Comoros.
We are always ready,
We the citizens of the Comoros,
If we have to spill our blood
To save our country.

Chorus

II
𝄆 All the youth are united,
Boys and girls. 𝄇
It is life in progress
For us, citizens of the Comoros.
