= Territory of the Comoros =

Former French overseas territory

Territoire des Comores
- Overseas territory of France
- 1946–1975
- Flag of the Territory of the Comoros
- Government
  - Type: French overseas territory
- History
  - Established: 1946
  - Disestablished: 1975
Preceded by	Succeeded by
Colony of Madagascar and Dependencies	Mayotte; State of the Comoros

The Territory of the Comoros (French: Territoire des Comores) was a French overseas territory consisting of the four main Comoro Islands (Grande Comore, Mohéli, Anjouan and Mayotte) that existed from 1946 to 1975. It was part of the French Union under the Fourth Republic, then part of the French Community established by the Constitution of the Fifth Republic from 1958.

In 1975, following a referendum, the territory was divided - the islands of Grande Comore, Mohéli and Anjouan became independent under the new State of the Comoros, while Mayotte voted to remain a French overseas territory, and later became the 101st French department in 2011.

== History ==
=== Establishment ===
In June 1843, Mayotte became the first of the Comoro Islands to become a French colony. In the 1880s and 1890s, the three other islands - Grande Comore, Anjouan and Mohéli - became French protectorates in 1886, 1887 and 1892, respectively In 1912, these three islands became colonies as well.

Between 1912 and 1946, all four islands were governed with Madagascar as the Colony of Madagascar and Dependencies.

In 1946, the Comoros archipelago became a French overseas territory with its capital in Dzaoudzi, Mayotte. The Territorial Assembly of the Comoros was founded, with representatives from all four islands.

=== 1950s and 1960s ===
In 1952, Comoros established its own customs regime. In 1958, a referendum was held in which Comorians overwhelmingly voted in favour of remaining part of France. Following this referendum, a constitution providing for self-government was promulgated.

In the 1960s, politics in the territory were largely dominated by descendants of the ruling families of the precolonial sultanate. This group was conservative and pro-French. In this period, two main political parties emerged - the Parti Vert (Green Party), later known as the Comoros Democratic Union, and the Parti Blanc (White Party), later known as the Democratic Assembly of the Comorian People.

Dr. Said Mohamed Cheikh, president of the Parti Vert and of the Governing Council, was, until his death in 1970, the most important political leader in the islands. The Parti Blanc, under Prince Said Ibrahim, was in the opposition, supported progressive policies including land reform and weakening foreign monopoly on Comorian cash crops.

=== Independence movement ===
In 1962, Comorian expatriates in Tanzania established the National Liberation Movement of Comoros (Mouvement de la Libération Nationale des Comores - MOLINACO). Molinaco actively promoted Comorian independence abroad, especially in the Organization of African Unity (OAU).

An increasing number of Comorians, particularly younger ones, resentful about perceived French neglect of the islands, began to support independence. The ruling elite, although pro-French, began to view independence as a "regrettable necessity". In 1972, leaders of the Parti Vert and the Parti Blanc agreed to push for independence, while aspiring to maintain good relations with France.

==== 1974 Referendum ====
An independence referendum was held on December 22, 1974 in the four islands. Three of the islands voted for independence, but Mayotte chose to remain as a French department:

Island	For independence		Against independence		Invalid votes	Total votes	Registered voters	Voter Turnout %
Island	Votes	%	Votes	%	Invalid votes	Total votes	Registered voters	Voter Turnout %
Anjouan	58,897	99.93	44	0.07	4	58,945	61,406	95.99
Grande Comore	84,123	99.98	21	0.02	39	84,183	89,215	94.36
Mayotte	5,110	36.78	8,783	63.22	84	13,977	17,946	77.88
Mohéli	6,054	99.92	5	0.08	3	6,062	6,351	95.45
Total	154,184	94.57	8,853	5.43	130	163,167	174,918	93.28
Source: African Elections Database

=== Independence ===
In spite of a 1973 agreement with France that independence would be granted in 1978, the Comorian parliament passed a resolution on July 6, 1975 declaring unilateral independence. The deputies of Mayotte abstained from the vote. The French government recognised the independence of Grande Comore, Anjouan and Mohéli on 31 December 1975, but did not mention Mayotte. A referendum was subsequently held in Mayotte in February 1976 on remaining part of the Comoros. The proposal was rejected by over 99% of voters, with voter turnout at 83.34%.

== Economy ==
The economy of the Comoro islands was dominated by the Société Comores Bambao, which managed the majority of the archipelago's arable land and possessed a monopoly on establishing all non-indigenous companies. By the 1960s, the Comoros were no longer food self-sufficient, as food represented 30% to 35% of all imports.

The French and local leading citizens established plantations to grow cash crops for export, and the economy was dominated by French companies such as Société Bambao and Établissements Grimaldi. These firms would divert most of their profits overseas, with little investment in the islands' development beyond what was needed for managing the plantations. A serious consequence of this approach has been the languishing of the food-crop agricultural sector and the resultant dependence on overseas food imports, particularly rice.

== Administration ==
In 1973 the Comoros was governed by a French High Commissioner, who reported to the Ministry of Overseas Departments and Territories. The High Commissioner managed foreign relations and defense, police, judiciary, higher education and finance, French aid and broadcasting. In 1962 a Territorial legislature was established, with 39 members. There was also a Council of Government, consisting of 6-9 ministers. The islands were each divided in prefectures, with sub-prefectures on each island. There were elections every 5 years. All Comorians had French citizenship.
