= 1967 French legislative election in the Comoros =

Elections to the French National Assembly were held in the Comoros on 5 March 1967. The result was a victory for the List for the French Republic, which won both seats. The seats were taken by Saïd Ibrahim Ben Ali and Mohamed Ahmed.

== Results ==
Party	Votes	%	Seats	+/–
List for the Fifth Republic	93,237	100.00	2	0
Total	93,237	100.00	2	–
Valid votes	93,237	99.81		
Invalid/blank votes	178	0.19		
Total votes	93,415	100.00		
Registered voters/turnout	110,346	84.66		
Source: Sternberger et al.
