= Star of Said Ali =

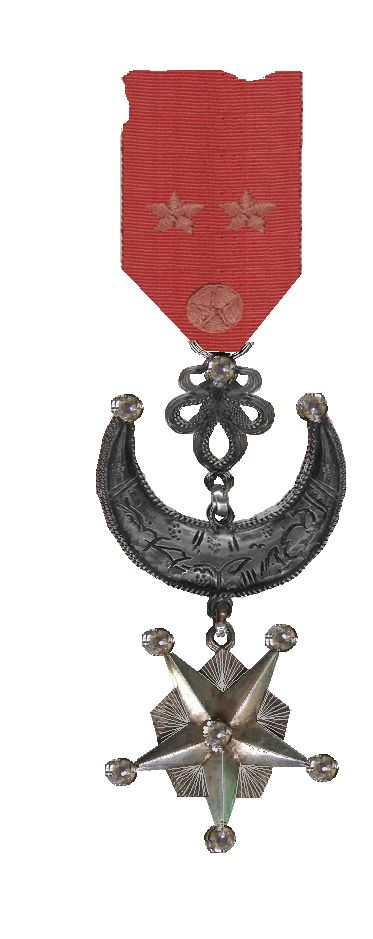
- Jewel with diamonds, around 1886
- Type: Order with four degrees: Grand-Croix (Grand-Cross); Commandeur (Commander); Officier (Officer); Chevalier (Knight)
- Presented by: France Comoros
- Established: 1886
- Ribbon of the order

The Star of Said Ali (French: "Étoile de Said Ali"), also "Orde of the Ster van Said Ali" was instituted in 1886 by King Saidi Ali ibn Saidi Omar, ruler of Bambao, first king of the united Grande Comore. The decoration is an Order of Merit.

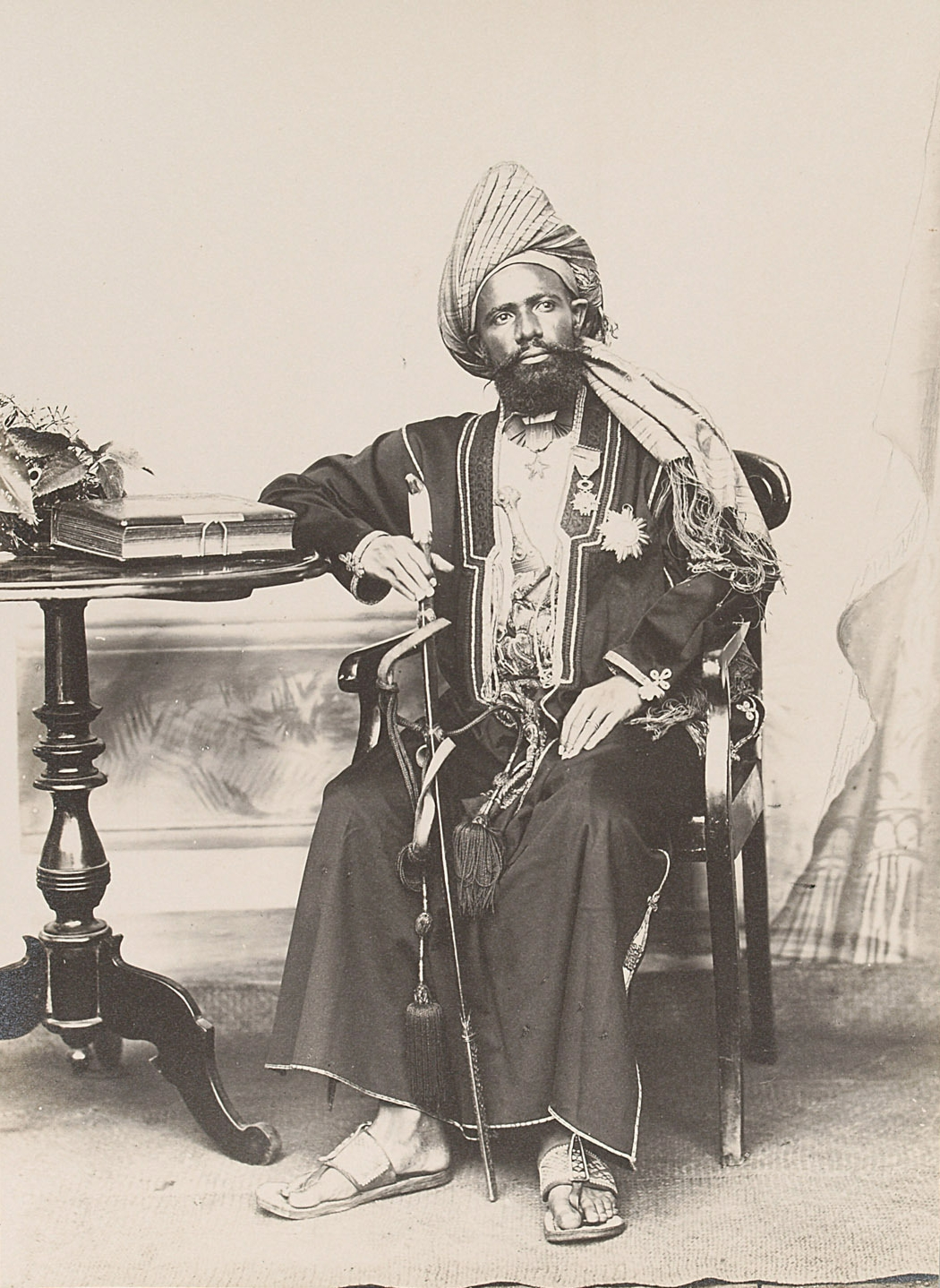
A portrait of the banished Saidi Ali ibn Saidi Omar

== Order between 1886 and 1892 ==
The first jewel was a typical Arab piece of silver embellished with a number of diamonds and words in Arabic. The ribbon was woven of dark red silk and embroidered with golden stars. Said Ali established the Order to recognize meritorious service by civilian or military personnel.

As the prince and his subjects were Muslims a star was chosen as a design and not a cross.

== Order after 1892 ==
The later design was awarded in four classes,

- Grand Cross
- Commander
- Officer
- Knight

Its second design is based on a double-sided five-pointed star of dark green enamel with gold ball finials at the end of each point. Diamonds were no longer used. The star is layered over rays of gold between each arm. A raised Arabic inscription is encircled in the center of the star. This is suspended from a large golden crescent with small green enamel star(s) on it (three on the Commander grade and one on the Knight grade). The original metal design of this Order varies considerably from the later enameled version. The Order of the Star of Anjouan was related to this order.
