= 1962 Comoros by-election =

A by-election to the French National Assembly was held in the Comoros on 4 March 1962, following the resignation of Saïd Mohamed Cheikh after he became Comorian Prime Minister. The result was a victory for Mohamed Ahmed of the List for the Fifth Republic.

== Results ==
Candidate	Votes	%
Mohamed Ahmed	52,231	87.26
Said Mohamed Jaffar	7,628	12.74
Total	59,859	100.00
Valid votes	59,859	99.52
Invalid/blank votes	286	0.48
Total votes	60,145	100.00
Registered voters/turnout	81,811	73.52
Source: Sternberger et al.
