= List of wars involving Comoros =

Comoros, an island nation off East Africa, has been involved in military conflicts since becoming independent of France in 1975. Opération Azalée (1995) was a French invasion of the islands to oppose an attempted coup d'état and Comoros itself led the 2008 invasion of Anjouan.

Conflict	Combatant 1	Combatant 2	Result
Operation Azalee (1995)	Comoros	France	French victory: Bob Denard arrested
2008 invasion of Anjouan (2008)	African Union: Comoros; Senegal; Sudan; Tanzania; Supported by: France (logistical support); Libyan Arab Jamahiriya (logistical support)	Anjouan	Comorian government and African Union victory: Mohamed Bacar flees to Mayotte; Autonomous government of Anjouan is replaced

== See also ==
- Foreign relations of the Comoros
