= 1968 French legislative election in the Comoros =

Elections to the French National Assembly were held in the Comoros on 23 June 1968. The result was a victory for the List for the French Republic, which won both seats. The seats were taken by Saïd Ibrahim Ben Ali and Mohamed Ahmed.

== Results ==
Two independent candidates contested the election, Abdou Sidi Elface and Saïd Ali Youssouf.

Party	Votes	%	Seats	+/–
List for the Fifth Republic	55,605	77.12	2	0
Independents	16,493	22.88	0	New
Total	72,098	100.00	2	0
Valid votes	72,098	99.24		
Invalid/blank votes	552	0.76		
Total votes	72,650	100.00		
Registered voters/turnout	111,533	65.14		
Source: Sternberger et al.
