= 1962 French legislative election in the Comoros =

Elections to the French National Assembly were held in the Comoros on 18 November 1962. The result was a victory for the List for the French Republic, which won both seats. The seats were taken by Saïd Ibrahim Ben Ali and Mohamed Ahmed.

== Results ==
Party	Votes	%	Seats	+/–
List for the Fifth Republic	73,934	100.00	2	0
Total	73,934	100.00	2	0
Valid votes	73,934	99.92		
Invalid/blank votes	56	0.08		
Total votes	73,990	100.00		
Registered voters/turnout	82,504	89.68		
Source: Sternberger et al.
