= Badgini =

Sultanate in The Comoros

Badgini (also spelled Bajini) was a sultanate on the island of Grande Comore in present day Comoros. It was independent until 1886, when Sultan Said Ali bin Said Omar of Bambao made it a part of the unified Ngazidja Sultanate. It was ruled by the M'Dombozi clan.
