= Solange Rosenmark =

Poet and novelist (1887–1963)

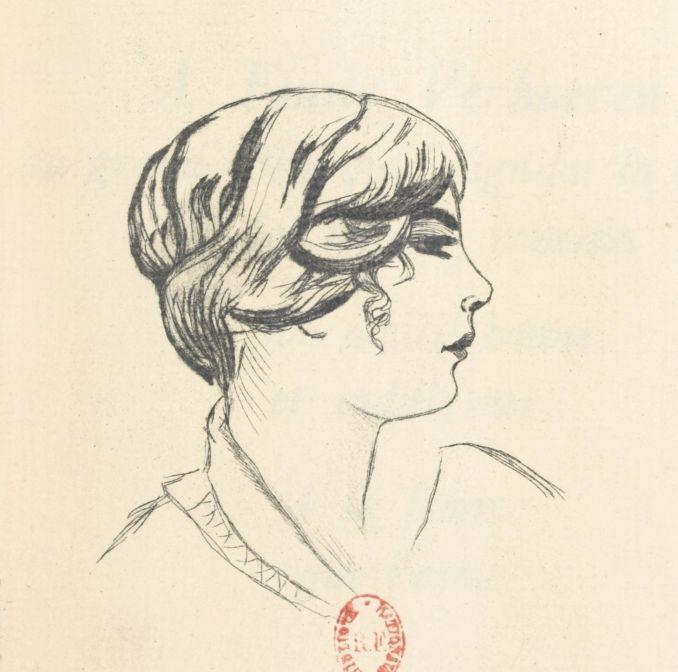
- portrait by Lucie Delarue-Mardus
- Born: November 12, 1887
- Died: August 17, 1963 (aged 75); Levallois-Perret
- Occupation: Writer, novelist, poet
- Parent(s): Charles de Bragard
- Awards: Chevalier of the Legion of Honour; Order of the Star of Anjouan

Signature
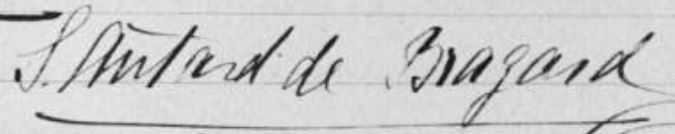

Solange Rosenmark (November 12, 1887 – August 17, 1963) was a French-language poet and novelist from Mauritius.

She was born Lucia Josephine Solange Autard De Bragard on November 12, 1887 in Port Louis, Mauritius, the daughter of painter Charles Autard de Bragard and Marie-Louise Brouesse de Laborde. She was the grand-niece of Emmeline Autard De Bragard, the subject of Charles Baudelaire's poem "À une dame créole". She married Hermann Raymond Rosenmark in 1918.

Rosenmark published a number of novels and collections of poetry. She was a contributor to the periodical La Revue de France.

Solange Rosenmark died on 17 August 1963 in Paris.

== Awards and honours ==
Rosenmark was awarded the Chevalier of the Legion of Honour and the Commander of the Order of the Star of Anjouan and was a member of the Société des gens de lettres de France.

== Bibliography ==
- La dame créole (1923)
- Amour, cher menteur (novel)
- L'homme à la patte d'oie (novel)
- Chacun son amour (novel)
- Poésies de la Bachelette Solange de Bragard (poetry, 1938)
- Le vent se lève (poetry, 1955)
- Le chant de la paix (poetry, 1962)
