= Bambao =

Bambao may refer to:

- Sultanate of Bambao, a state on the island of Grande Comore until 1886
- Bambao Mtrouni, a village on the island of Anjouan in the Comoros
- Boeni ya Bambao, a village on the island of Grande Comore in the Comoros
