= René Journiac =

French counsellor on African affairs (1921–1980)

Head of African Department
- In office 1974–1980
- President: Valéry Giscard d'Estaing
- Preceded by: Jacques Foccart (as Secretary-General for African and Malagasy Affairs)
- Succeeded by: Martin Kirsch

Personal details
- Born: René Antoine Georges Journiac; 11 May 1921 Saint-Martin-Vésubie, Alpes-Maritimes
- Died: 6 February 1980 (aged 58) Cameroon

René Journiac (Saint-Martin-Vésubie, 11 May 1921 – Cameroon, 6 February 1980) was a French magistrate and high functionary. He served as a prominent counsellor on African affairs and as leader of the government's "African Department" during the presidency of Valéry Giscard d'Estaing.

Journiac first rose to power under Georges Pompidou as a right-hand man of Jacques Foccart and was seen as perpetuating the latter's approach of maintaining French influence in its former colonies through a web of personal relationships with African strongmen. This led the French historian Pascal Geneste to quip that "what Foccart was to de Gaulle, Journiac is to Pompidou".

After the election of Giscard in 1974, Journiac largely took over Foccart's functions in the Secretariat for African and Malagasy Affairs; the latter was renamed to the African Department. The main instigator of strong relations with Mobutu's Zaire, he signed a defense pact with the Zairese regime in 1974 which gave way to substantial French aid to Mobutu during the 1977 civil war. In 1977, documents forgotten by the mercenary Bob Denard during a coup attempt in Benin revealed the complicity of Journiac (alongside Omar Bongo, Hassan II and Gnassingbé Eyadéma) in the attempt. He was also closely involved in Operation Tacaud in Chad and played an important role in negotiating with Jean-Bédel Bokassa (who allegedly threatened to beat Journiac with his cane when the latter proposed that he step down) in the period that built up to the French-orchestrated 1979 coup.

In 1980, while travelling in a Gabonese airplane piloted by a nephew of Omar Bongo, Journiac's plane crashed in Cameroon, killing him. Martin Kirsch briefly succeeded him as head of the African Department before being replaced by Guy Penne.
