= Jacques Foccart =

French businessman, politician, and neocolonialist (1913–1997)

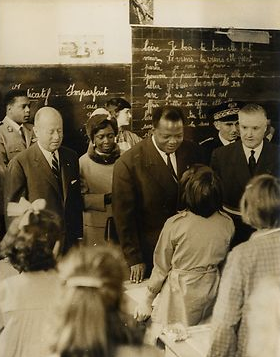
- Jacques Foccart (left), Hubert Maga (center), and Guy Chavanne (right) visiting a school in Torcy, Seine-et-Marne in 1961.

Secretary-General for African and Malagasy Affairs
- In office 1960–1974
- President: Charles de Gaulle; Georges Pompidou
- Succeeded by: René Journiac (as head of the African Department)

Secretary-General of Rally of the French People
- In office 1954–1954
- Preceded by: Louis Terrenoire
- Succeeded by: Michel Anfrol

Personal details
- Born: Jacques Koch-Foccart; 31 August 1913 Ambrières-les-Vallées, Mayenne, France
- Died: 19 March 1997 (aged 83) Paris, France
- Party: Rally of the French People
- Spouse: Isabelle Fenoglio (m. 1939)
- Parents: Guillaume Koch-Foccart (father); Elmire Courtemanche de la Clémandière (mother)
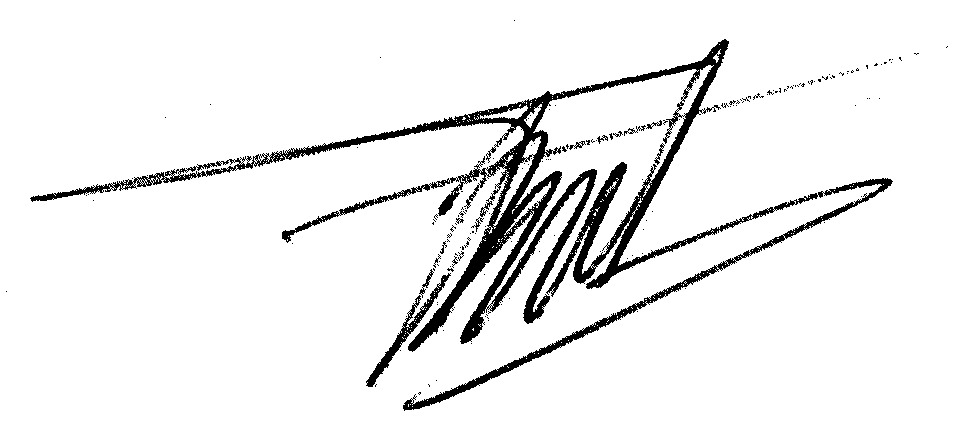
- Signature
- Nickname: Monsieur Afrique (Mr. Africa)

Jacques Foccart (French pronunciation: [ʒak fɔkaʁ]; 31 August 1913 – 19 March 1997) was a French businessman and politician, best known as a chief adviser to French presidents on African colonial, and later post-colonial affairs. He also co-founded in 1959 with Charles Pasqua the Service d'Action Civique (SAC), a controversial organization in the service of Charles de Gaulle. In the 1960s and early 1970s, he exercised significant influence over French policy in Africa, earning the nickname Monsieur Afrique ("Mister Africa").

From 1960 to 1974, Foccart was Secretary-General for African and Malagasy affairs under Presidents Charles de Gaulle and Georges Pompidou, and was pivotal in maintaining France's sphere of influence in sub-Saharan Africa (or Françafrique) by putting in place a series of cooperation accords with individual African countries and building a dense web of personal networks that underpinned the informal and family-like relationships between French and African leaders. After de Gaulle, Foccart was seen as the most influential man of the Fifth Republic. But through SAC, he was considered to be involved in various coups d'état in Africa during the 1960s. Nevertheless, Foccart retained his functions during Georges Pompidou's presidency (1969–74).

In 1974, Valéry Giscard d'Estaing replaced Foccart with René Journiac, Foccart's former deputy whom he had himself trained. He was then named in 1986 by the new Prime minister Jacques Chirac as an adviser on African affairs for the two years of "cohabitation" with socialist president François Mitterrand. When Chirac finally gained the presidency in 1995, the 81-year-old Foccart was brought back to the Elysée palace as an advisor. He died in 1997. According to the international affairs magazine The National Interest, "Foccart was said to have been telephoning African personalities on the subject of Zaire right up to the week before his death."

== Early life and career ==
Jacques Foccart was born on August 31, 1913, in Ambrières-les-Vallées, Mayenne, in west-central France, to a family of white planters from the Caribbean island of Guadeloupe. He married his wife, Isabelle Fenoglio, in 1939 and worked as a trader before World War II where he ran an import and export business. He was a sergeant in the French army during the war and later joined the French Resistance after France fell in 1940. He became close to Charles de Gaulle towards the end of the war and helped facilitate the latter's return to power in 1958. Foccart became secretary-general of Rally of the French People (RPF), a Gaullist party, in 1954 during the French Fourth Republic.

== Postcolonial Africa ==
Foccart played a central role in what became known as Françafrique, France's sphere of influence over its former colonies in sub-Saharan Africa. He was instrumental in putting in place the dense web of personal networks (or réseaux), a central feature of Françafrique, that underpinned the informal and family-like relationships between French and African leaders, which would go on to survive until the 1990s.

According to the US conservative magazine The National Interest, Jacques Foccart played "an essential role" in the negotiation of the Cooperation accords with the newly independent African states, former members of the French Community created in 1958. These accords involved the sectors of finance and economy, culture and education, and the military. There were initially eleven countries involved: Mauritania, Senegal, Côte d'Ivoire, Dahomey (now Benin), Upper Volta (now Burkina Faso), Niger, Chad, Gabon, Central African Republic, Congo-Brazzaville, and Madagascar. Togo and Cameroon, former UN Trust Territories, as well as, later on, Mali and the former Belgian territories (Ruanda-Urundi, now Rwanda and Burundi, and Congo-Kinshasa), together with some of the ex-Portuguese territories, and Comoros and Djibouti, which had also been under French rule for many years but became independent in the 1970s, were also later included.

The whole ensemble was put under a new Ministry of Cooperation, created in 1961, separate from the Ministry for Overseas Departments and Territories (known as the DOM-TOM) that had previously run them all. The National Interest review asserts that this "Cooperation Ministry, focal point of the new evolving French system in Africa, regarded Foccart both as their "guarantor" and their advocate with de Gaulle. If the General had conceived the apparatus (though in fact some of it simply happened by improvisation), Foccart was the machine minder."

In the late 1960s, working closely with Ivory Coast President Félix Houphouët-Boigny and Gabonese President Omar Bongo, he coordinated French support for the Biafran secession through the use of covert weapons transfers and mercenaries.

National Interest's review of his biography goes on with Foccart's admission that the French secret services eliminated the Cameroonian Marxist leader Félix-Roland Moumié in 1960. Furthermore, it quotes "some reports" which "suggested that Foccart and Houphouët spoke on the phone every Wednesday, and there is no doubt that he considered the Ivoirian leader the African centerpiece of his network. They operated together on a number of issues. Interventions such as that in Gabon in 1964 and Chad in 1969 were encouraged by the Foccart-Houphouet tandem. The most significant collaboration between Foccart and Houphouet was the way they tried to persuade de Gaulle to back the Biafran secession from Nigeria in 1967. Despite the pressures they exerted, however, de Gaulle refused to recognize Biafra, and, in retrospect, so guarded and elliptical are some of Foccart's statements that one cannot be sure what he really wanted or expected from de Gaulle at the time."

Foccart remained in service throughout Georges Pompidou's presidency (1969–1974). In 1972, Mongo Beti's Cruel hand on Cameroon, autopsy of a decolonization was censored upon its publication by François Maspero by the Ministry of the Interior Raymond Marcellin on the request, brought forward by Jacques Foccart, of the Cameroon government, represented in Paris by the ambassador Ferdinand Oyono.

Foccart was then replaced by President Valéry Giscard d'Estaing (1974–81) with René Journiac, whom he had trained himself. According to National Interest, he was critical of two special operations carried on under Giscard d'Estaing: the fiasco of the mercenary landing in Benin in January 1977 (with which he denies having had any connection, and would not have supported because it was poorly conceived and executed); and "Operation Barracuda", the military intervention that deposed Emperor Bokassa in September 1979. Journiac died on 6 February 1980, in a mysterious plane crash in Northern Cameroon.

Foccart was then rehabilitated in 1986 by new Prime Minister Chirac as an adviser on African affairs for the two years of the "cohabitation". When Chirac finally made it to the presidency in 1995, Foccart was brought back to the Elysée palace at the age of eighty-one, largely due to the depth of his relationships with African leaders such as President Omar Bongo of Gabon, whom he advised on African affairs for a number of years after 1974. He would criticize the devaluation of the CFA franc in January 1994 under Balladur's government, a month after Houphouët-Boigny's death.

== Domestic activities ==
Foccart's role was not limited to Africa, as he was also charged by de Gaulle with the secret services and with the following of the elections, in particular concerning the choice of the candidates during the 1960s. The Service d'Action Civique (SAC) helped him for those shady missions. Foccart also admitted in Foccart Parle that relations with the SDECE intelligence agency were his concerns. National Interest observes that "His biographer's claim that General de Gaulle asked Foccart to reorganize the SDECE (in view of the tainting of both the armed forces and the intelligence agencies by the movement for Algerie Francaise) is indirectly confirmed, but there is not a clear picture of the organization of the barbouzes."

With François de Grossouvre, Jacques Foccart also helped to create the Department Protection Security (DPS), security organization of the far-right Front National party led by Jean-Marie Le Pen.

== 1990s ==
In 1995, Jacques Foccart was part of president Jacques Chirac's visit to Morocco, Senegal, Côte d'Ivoire, and Gabon, all countries led by friends of Françafrique.

Such had been his influence on French colonial and post colonial policy that when he died on March 19, 1997, "For those involved with what has come to be known nowadays as "Françafrique", denoting the special French sphere of influence in Africa, many, along with Albert Bourgi of Jeune Afrique, saw Foccart's death as 'the end of an epoch.' "

The publication of his memoirs under the format of interviews at the end of his life, and the Journal de l'Elysée also published, in which, starting from 1965, Jacques Foccart transcribed his daily meetings with De Gaulle, have proved an invaluable resource for the knowledge of French policies in Africa.

Furthermore, at his trial in 2006, mercenary Bob Denard, who was tried for his 1995 coup d'état in the Comoros, alleged that Foccart had supported him.

== See also ==
- Colonialism and decolonization
- French colonial empires and Colonization of Africa
- Bob Denard, a French mercenary involved in various coups in the Comores and elsewhere
- Françafrique, France's sphere of influence over its former colonies in sub-Saharan Africa
- Omar Bongo, president of Gabon
- Félix Houphouët-Boigny, former president of Côte d'Ivoire
- Gnassingbé Eyadéma, president of Togo until his death in 2005 (replaced by his son Faure Gnassingbé)

== Bibliography ==
- Pierre Péan L'Homme de l'Ombre (Man of the Shadows) Fayard, (1990)
  - Affaires Africaines (African Business), Fayard, (1983)
- Jacques Foccart, Foccart parle, interviews with Philippe Gaillard, Fayard - Jeune Afrique
  - tome I, 1995, 500 pp., ISBN 2-213-59419-8
  - tome II, 1997, 523 pp., ISBN 2-213-59498-8
- Jacques Foccart, Journal de l'Élysée, Fayard - Jeune Afrique
  - tome 1 : Tous les soirs avec de Gaulle (1965-1967), 1997, 813 pp. ISBN 2-213-59565-8
  - tome 2 : Le Général en mai (1968-1969), 1998, ISBN 2-213-60057-0
  - tome 3 : Dans les bottes du Général, (1969–1971), 1999, 787 pp., ISBN 2-213-60316-2
  - tome 4 : La France pompidolienne (1971-1972), 2000, ISBN 2-213-60580-7
  - tome 5 : La Fin du gaullisme (1973-1974), 2001
- Jean-François Miniac, Les grandes affaires criminelles de l'Orne, de Borée, (2008). ( about Emile Buffon, François Van Aerden and Foccart in Orne during the war.)
