= 1977 Comorian presidential referendum =

- 28 October 1977
- Referendum on the presidency of Ali Soilih

Results
Choice	Votes	%
Yes	86,065	56.63%
No	65,906	43.37%

A referendum on the presidency of Ali Soilih was held in the Comoros on 28 October 1977. The result was 57% in favour and 43% against, with a 92% voter turnout. Despite the backing, Soilih was overthrown on 13 May 1978 by forces hired by exiled former leader Ahmed Abdallah, who was restored to power.

== Results ==
Choice	Votes	%
For	86,065	56.63
Against	65,906	43.37
Total	151,971	100.00
Registered voters/turnout	164,828	–
Source: African Elections Database
