= 7 Independent Company (Rhodesia) =

Rhodesian military unit composed of French volunteers

- 7ème Compagnie indépendante
- Active: November 1977 – May 1978
- Disbanded: May 1978
- Country: Various French-speaking nations
- Allegiance: Rhodesia
- Branch: Rhodesian Army
- Type: Infantry
- Size: Company
- Part of: 1st Battalion, the Rhodesia Regiment
- Garrison/HQ: Cranborne Barracks, Salisbury
- Colours: (France) French tricolour
- Engagements: Rhodesian Bush War

Commanders
- Officers commanding: Major Roland de l'Assomption; Major Mario La Viola

7 Independent Company (7 Indep Coy; French: 7ème Compagnie indépendante) was a short-lived company of Francophone volunteers in the Rhodesian Army during the Rhodesian Bush War. Numbering about 200 men at its peak, it was unique in the history of the Rhodesian Army as an exclusively expatriate unit. It existed between November 1977 and May 1978 as a company in the 1st Battalion, the Rhodesia Regiment, and served two counter-insurgency tours on Operation Hurricane in north-eastern Rhodesia (today Zimbabwe).

During the Bush War, the Rhodesian Army augmented its ranks with foreign volunteers, who were accepted into regular regiments with the same pay and conditions of service as locals. Most foreign recruits enlisted in the Rhodesian Light Infantry (RLI), which launched an overseas recruitment programme in 1974, but required successful applicants to speak good English. The Army attempted to alleviate the strain on its troops during late 1977 by recruiting French-speakers as well, and formed a designated company in the Rhodesia Regiment for them. The regiment already had six independent companies, so the francophone unit became 7 Independent Company.

The company's men, a mixture of former French paratroopers, ex-Foreign Legionnaires and young adventurers, had trouble from the start integrating with the Rhodesian forces, and became unsettled by the respective ranks they were given in the Rhodesian Army. In an attempt to raise their morale and create a strong esprit de corps, the Army issued them beret insignias backed with the French tricolour and allowed them to raise the flag of France alongside that of Rhodesia each morning. Apparently under the impression that they had signed up as highly paid mercenaries, many of the French troopers returned home after their first bush trip, unhappy to have received no more money than a regular Rhodesian soldier.

On operations their performance was generally average, the Frenchmen were involved in some successful actions during February and early March 1978. Their oppressive treatment of the black villagers they encountered made them very unpopular in the operational area. The Rhodesians deemed the experiment a failure and following a series of disasters for the company during the latter part of its second tour, including two friendly fire incidents and several fatalities, it was disbanded in May 1978. Forces led by one of its members, Bob Denard, later that month executed a coup d'état in the Comoros with French, Rhodesian and South African governmental support.

== Background ==
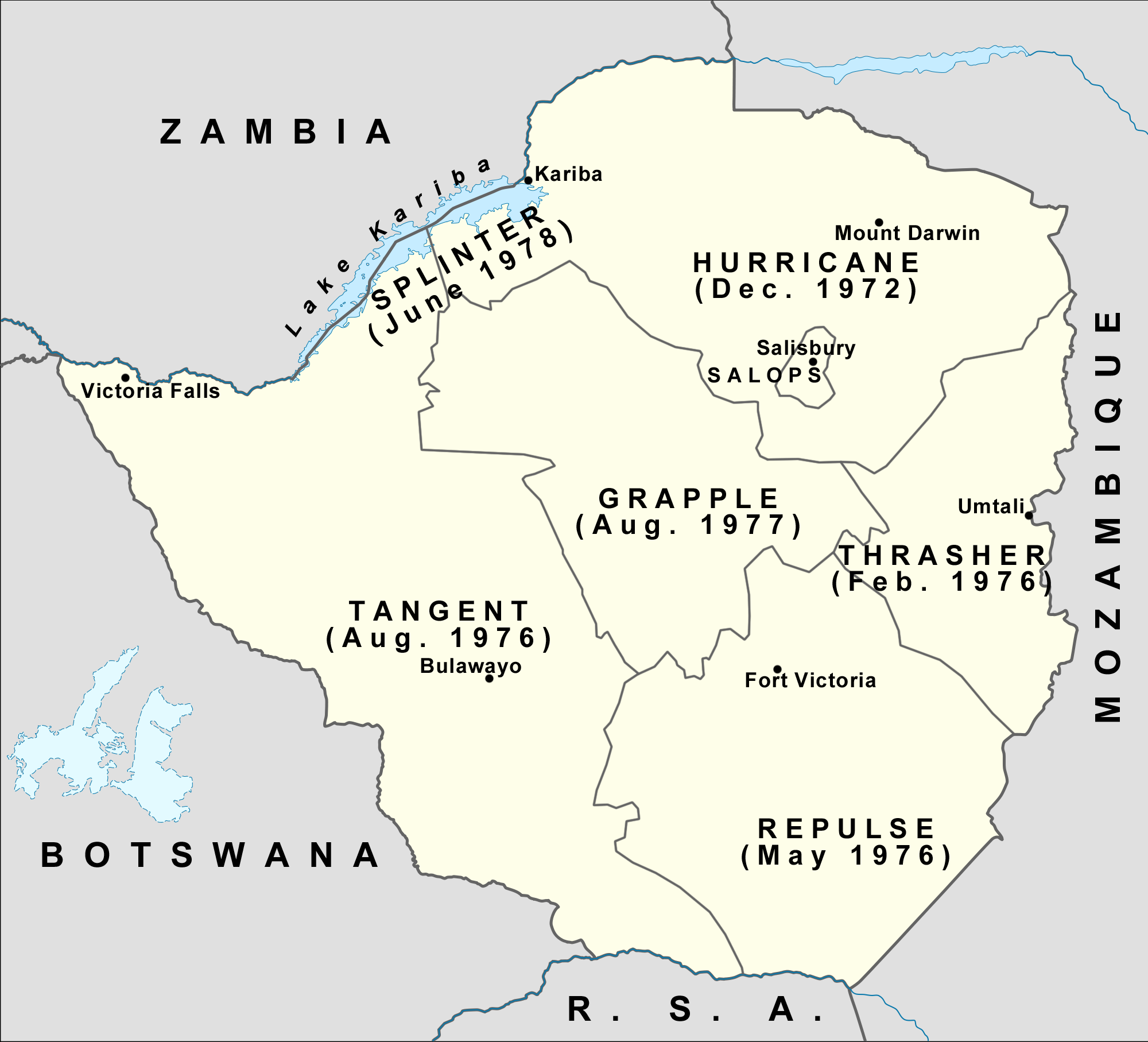
The Rhodesian Security Forces defined seven operational areas across the country during the 1970s, starting with Operation Hurricane in December 1972.

Following a dispute with the British government regarding terms for the granting of full independence, the predominantly white minority government of the self-governing colony of Rhodesia (or Southern Rhodesia), led by Ian Smith, unilaterally declared independence on 11 November 1965. Britain and the United Nations refused to recognise this and each imposed economic sanctions on Rhodesia. Meanwhile, the country's two most prominent communist-backed black nationalist groups, the Zimbabwe African National Union and the Zimbabwe African People's Union, mobilised their respective guerrilla armies, the Zimbabwe African National Liberation Army (ZANLA) and the Zimbabwe People's Revolutionary Army (ZIPRA), for what they called the "Second Chimurenga", with the goal of overthrowing the government and introducing black majority rule.

The Rhodesian Bush War was the result, beginning in earnest on 21 December 1972 when ZANLA attacked Altena and Whistlefield Farms near Centenary in the country's north-east. The Rhodesian Security Forces launched Operation Hurricane in response and fought back strongly, reducing the number of guerrillas active within the country to under 300 by December 1974. In the period October–November 1974, they killed more nationalist fighters than in the previous two years combined. However, a South African-brokered ceasefire, which the security forces respected and the insurgents ignored, helped the nationalists to win back ground. By 1977 there were 2,500 guerrillas operating in Rhodesia, with several times that number in training abroad.

The Rhodesian Army, though mostly made up of local men, also included some foreign volunteers, who were integrated into regular units under the same salary and conditions of service. Almost all of the foreigners served in the Rhodesian Light Infantry (RLI), a heliborne commando battalion with a glamorous international reputation. The RLI initiated a major overseas recruitment drive in 1974, targeting potential volunteers from Europe, Oceania and the Americas, and requiring successful applicants to speak good English. This campaign was bearing considerable fruit by May 1976, when the RLI's largest ever intake included more foreign volunteers than any before, and the enlisting of men from overseas into the RLI would increase yet further. By 1977–78 there were around 1,500 foreigners in the Rhodesian forces. However, the Rhodesian Army remained stretched and low on manpower.

== Formation and training ==
The idea for a francophone unit came from a French national, François Cramer, who had business interests and connections in Rhodesia. He proposed it to Major-General Sandy MacLean, then the Rhodesian Army's second-in-command, while they were visiting France together. MacLean relayed the idea to the General Staff in Salisbury, which decided in late 1977 to form a "French battalion" to alleviate the strain on its regular units. A Rhodesian officer of French extraction, Cyril Bernard, warned his superiors strongly against the scheme, but was ultimately himself sent to France to start the project. On the way he stopped in Zurich, Switzerland, where MacLean gave him final approval for the operation and a budget of US$30,000. They resolved to recruit mainly in Paris and Lyon. Bernard then entered France and renewed old connections from the French military academy at Saint-Cyr.

Recruitment was carried out by a former French paratrooper, Roger Bruni, operating from an apartment on Rue Bachaumont in central Paris. Advertisements, placed in newspapers such as France Soir, offered "a job with a future abroad ... minimum age 22, former non-commissioned officers preferred". The body of men eventually assembled varied widely in terms of age, background and experience, but was based largely around ex-paratroopers and former Foreign Legionnaires. The average age was about 25. French-speaking veterans of an assortment of African and Middle Eastern conflicts spanning the previous two decades successfully applied, but past service did not prove a necessity; some of the men accepted had no military experience. Most of them spoke English only at a basic level if at all.

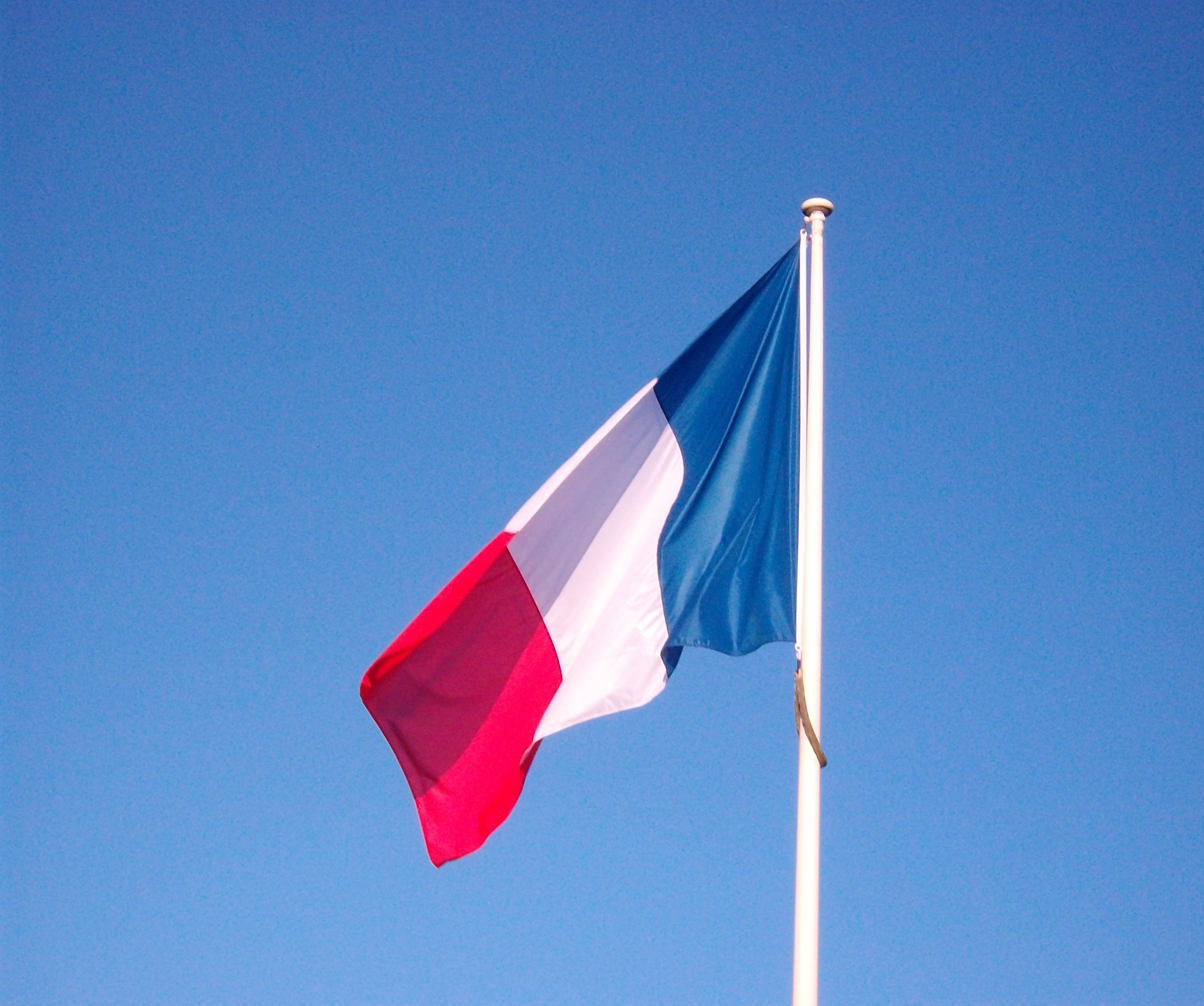
The unit was allowed to fly the French tricolour (pictured) at its camp alongside the flag of Rhodesia.

Once signed up, each man was instructed to travel to Switzerland, where appropriate visas were swiftly procured from the South African Embassy. In early November 1977, the French recruits flew from Zurich to Johannesburg on a South African Airways liner, then to Salisbury by Air Rhodesia. Already in Rhodesia waiting for the men were their leaders: Major Roland de l'Assomption, an ex-officer of the French Army's crack 11th Shock Parachute Regiment, and a former officer of the Gabonese President Omar Bongo's guard; and Major Mario La Viola, once a non-commissioned officer in the Foreign Legion's 2nd Parachute Regiment. Beneath them were the Antillean Captain Toumi, who became the first black officer in the regular Rhodesian Army as the unit's second-in-command, and "Colonel" Bob Denard, an infamous French soldier of fortune nicknamed le chien de guerre—"the dog of war".

According to an anonymous veteran of the unit, it mostly comprised recently discharged servicemen from the French forces who were having trouble adapting to civilian life. "They didn't know how to do anything else, only how to jump with a parachute and obey orders," he explained, "and they liked that kind of thing." Others, he said, were members of the political far right who had joined up "to kill commies and blacks", and some were criminals hoping to escape the attention of the French police. Each signed on for two years. The French-speaking unit was placed in the Rhodesia Regiment (RR) as an "independent company". The RR already had six of these (made up of Rhodesians), so the Frenchmen became 7 Independent Company.

The Rhodesian Army sought to forge a strong esprit de corps among the new recruits, and to this end extended them several sentimental allowances: for example, morale amongst the Frenchmen rose when they were informed that the Rhodesian insignia on their berets would be backed with the French tricolour. In a similar vein, their request for permission to raise the flag of France alongside that of Rhodesia outside their headquarters each morning was approved. French-speaking men already in the army were attached to the unit to act as interpreters and assist with coordination and tactical instruction. Some of these were Mauritians, who by virtue of their upbringing spoke both English and French at a native-like level. The company itself, which numbered about 200 men, was assigned headquarters near Salisbury at Cranborne Barracks, the home of the Rhodesian Light Infantry. It was organised in the same manner as a standard Rhodesian independent company, the only exception being its exclusively francophone personnel.

You may be engaged in the Rhodesian Army today, but you are Frenchmen, and in a war against international communism. You are here for France.

— Major La Viola addresses the French company, November 1977

Spirits were high during the unit's brief training period as the men enjoyed playing sports, observing the country scenery and experiencing the night-life of the nearby capital. They were not adequately trained, receiving only a basic medical examination, a few days' fitness training and a cursory explanation of proper conduct in the bush. They expressed surprise when instructed to paint stripes of camouflage green on their weapons and combat boots in the Rhodesian fashion, having never before heard of such a practice.

The first dent to morale came after about a week when the volunteers were first issued ranks in the Rhodesian Army. In the eyes of some of the French-speaking soldiers, the ranks assigned appeared to have been chosen almost at random by their superiors, and did not reflect their actual respective levels of training, ability and experience. Some men who considered themselves to have been overlooked began to have problems with discipline. The brazen attitude of most of the company's soldiers jarred strongly with that of their Rhodesian commanders, who had high standards regarding presentation and dress which many of the Frenchmen had little inclination to meet.

== Service ==
=== First bush trip ===
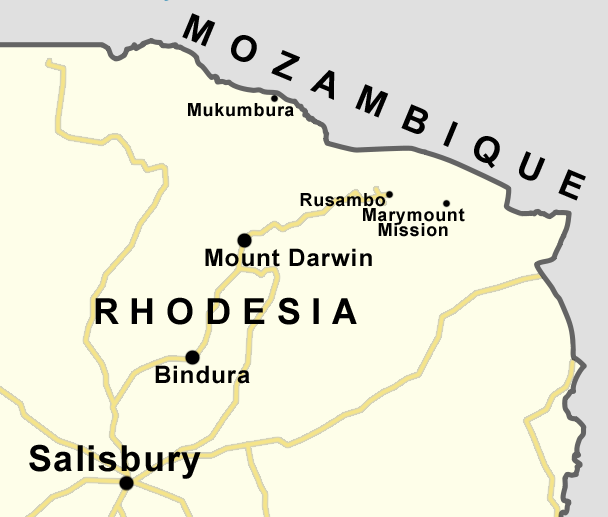
7 Independent Company was posted to north-eastern Rhodesia—first to Rusambo, then to Marymount.

The francophone company was first deployed out of its barracks in late November 1977, when it was sent to Bindura, about 88 kilometres (55 mi) north-east from Salisbury, for a few days in the bush on Operation Hurricane, the Army's operational area which covered Rhodesia's north-east against guerrilla activity. After this passed without major incident, the Frenchmen were despatched to Rusambo, a camp in the Chimanda Tribal Trust Lands, near Rushinga, about 250 kilometres (160 mi) north-east from the capital and less than 20 kilometres (12 mi) from the border with Mozambique. Most insurgents in this area belonged to ZANLA.

A company of men from the Territorial Force was already stationed at Rusambo, advised by a team of intelligence officers. "Sticks" of four men (three FN FAL riflemen and an MAG gunner) would be sent out into the bush from Rusambo for periods of up to two weeks, equipped with a radio to communicate with the base. Their task while in action was to seek out guerrillas by means of patrolling, ambushing and operating observation and listening posts. Once a group of insurgents was spotted, the stick leader would report their positions; Rusambo would then alert the Army and request a Fireforce. If Fireforce were available, it would arrive and engage the cadres; if not, the stick in the field would have to handle the situation itself.

At first, men from 7 Independent Company were sent out in sticks mixed with the Territorials, but problems soon arose regarding proper regimen and the language barrier. When the Frenchmen were then sent out alone, their Land Rovers prominently flying the French flag, the issue of language was resolved, but that of indiscipline remained. Though discretion was paramount if they were to observe enemy movements covertly and effectively, the men of 7 Independent Company were found to have difficulty maintaining this and sometimes made careless mistakes which risked revealing their presence. Moreover, when investigations were made of local kraals, marked tension soon arose between the Frenchmen and the local black population; the soldiers' ignorance of English or Shona made it very difficult for discussions to take place and, according to other Rhodesian units who came into contact with them, the French soldiers took out their frustration on the villagers, often using excessive force in their attempted interrogations. Nyamahoboko Police Station received a report of a 7 Independent Company man raping a young woman in a dense thicket, but did not act on it. According to one history of the Rhodesia Regiment, "it was indicated that the Frenchmen had received instruction that all black people were to be regarded as terrorists".

The Rhodesian Army quickly deemed the French experiment a failure. It reassigned 7 Independent Company in late November to Marymount Mission, a small settlement to the east of Rusambo where there was a minor police station. The number of patrols they would embark on was reduced. Two of the company's vehicles were ambushed by cadres between Marymount and Rusambo on 6 January 1978, resulting in two men being injured, one fatally so. A week later another truck was surprised on the same bush road, resulting in one death and three serious casualties. The company was brought back from the bush four days later for rest and recuperation (R&R) in Salisbury.

=== Strike ===
During their 15-day rest periods the company's men congregated around the Belgian-owned Elizabeth Hotel, in the centre of the city at the corner of Causeway and Manica Road. Many of them became seriously disaffected when they first received their salary from the Rhodesian Army. Having apparently been misled about wages of up to R$1,000 per month (₣7,000) by the French recruiters, they were surprised to find that their basic monthly pay was actually R$245 (₣1,800), the same as a regular Rhodesian soldier. Moreover, some were upset that they had been paid in Rhodesian dollars, which because of the country's international isolation could not easily be exchanged for foreign currencies. Although it was not as much as they had been expecting, one disenchanted veteran of the unit afterwards admitted that the tax-exempt R$245 wage, which came with a $10 special-unit supplement, was still more than enough money for them to live comfortably in Salisbury during their time off.

The pay dispute split the unit. About two-thirds went on strike, saying they would not return to action unless the Army upped their wages and paid them in foreign currency. Meanwhile, some of the more contented Frenchmen made steps to remain permanently, buying cars and having their wives join them in Salisbury. The Army detained the strike's ringleaders for insubordination. With neither side willing to budge—the Army refused to give the strikers extra pay or special treatment, saying this would contravene Rhodesia's policy not to engage mercenaries—the disaffected men were repatriated to France at their own request. The Rhodesian Army considered disbanding the unit altogether, but persevered when Major de l'Assomption convinced his superiors that his remaining men were still loyal and eager to continue serving.

=== Second bush trip; dissolution ===
Starting on 11 February 1978, 7 Independent Company spent half a week at Mount Darwin, where there was a major Army base. The company acquitted themselves well during this time, but one of their number was badly injured in a motor accident. They returned to Rusambo, where the camp was now manned by the British South Africa Police (BSAP), Criminal Investigation Department and Special Branch, guarded by a group of Coloured and Indian-Rhodesian soldiers. On 26 February, the Frenchmen spotted a group of seven cadres indoctrinating tribespeople at a local kraal, and called up Fireforce. The RLI men who arrived killed four of the seven, including one carrying detailed documents. The next day 7 Independent Company observed 11 guerrillas entering another kraal, but this time the Fireforce took too long to arrive. The French company took part in a large contact on 1 March, fighting alongside an RLI Fireforce against 28 cadres; 18 insurgents were killed in this contact without loss for the Rhodesian Army.

Soon after this, two sticks from 7 Independent Company were despatched to Marymount, led by a deputy intelligence officer who began sending them out on more regular night patrols. The following months were a disaster for the locally based Rhodesian forces; first one stick fired on another, causing an injury, then a BSAP Land Rover hit a mine, killing two members of the French company. A further Frenchman died in an ambush by insurgents before another friendly fire incident on 19 April 1978 resulted in a fatality. On several occasions during this bush trip the area was "frozen"; regular army units were confined to their camps while the Selous Scouts operated against the guerrillas. With morale amongst the Frenchmen plummeting, bringing their unit close to collapse, its officers at Rusambo frantically worked to keep it together. The company did not last much longer once back in Salisbury for R&R. Soon after three of its troopers were placed in detention at Llewellin Barracks, the unit was formally dissolved in May 1978. The only personnel retained by the Army were the interpreters, who were returned to their former units.

== Legacy ==
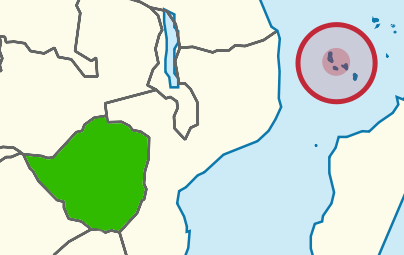
Rhodesia (green) and the Comoros (red)

Supported by the French, Rhodesian and South African governments and with Rhodesian logistical assistance, forces led by Denard took part in a coup d'état in the Comoros later in May, toppling Ali Soilih (who Denard had himself put into power three years earlier). The Comoros subsequently became a key location for Rhodesian "sanction-busting" operations, providing a convenient end-user certificate for clandestine shipments of weapons and equipment bound for Rhodesia in spite of the UN embargo. South Africa, also under a UN arms boycott because of apartheid, received war materiel through the Comoros in a similar fashion.

Some 7 Independent Company men became civilians in Rhodesia, which was reconstituted as Zimbabwe in 1980. Two of them, Gervais Henri Alfred Boutanquoi and Simon Marc Chemouil (both former Foreign Legionnaires), were executed in April 1983, despite a late plea from French authorities for clemency, having been found guilty of robbing and murdering Richard Kraft, a Karoi café owner. Witness Mangwende, the Zimbabwean Minister of Foreign Affairs, issued a statement clarifying that the execution was for the murder and unrelated to their earlier "service as mercenaries during the time of the Smith regime."

== Notes and references ==
=== Newspaper and journal articles ===
- Backmann, René (3 July 1978). "La Confession d'un 'Chien de Guerre'" [The confession of a 'Dog of War']. Le Nouvel Observateur (in French). Paris: 64–70, 80–82.
- Béguin, François; Renou, Xavier (15 October 2007). "'Bob Denard a toujours agi pour le compte de l'Etat français'" [Bob Denard always acted on behalf of the French State]. Le Monde (in French). Paris: La Vie-Le Monde.
- Montfort, Robert (September 1987). Micheletti, Eric (ed.). "La Septième Compagnie indépendante: les volontaires français en Rhodésie" [The Seventh Independent Company: the French volunteers in Rhodesia]. RAIDS (in French) (16). Paris: Histoire et Collections: 16–20.
- Montfort, Robert (October 1987). Micheletti, Eric (ed.). "La Septième Compagnie indépendante: les volontaires français en Rhodésie (II)" [The Seventh Independent Company: the French volunteers in Rhodesia (part II)]. RAIDS (in French) (17). Paris: Histoire et Collections: 28–31.
- Venter, A J (June 1979). "Rhodesia's Tragic Terrorist War: The End is Near". Soldier of Fortune. Bounder, Colorado: Omega Group: 38–43.
- "Frenchmen hanged". The Straits Times. Kuala Lumpur. 29 April 1983. p. 48.
- "L'ancien mercenaire Bob Denard est mort" [Former mercenary Bob Denard dies]. Le Figaro (in French). Paris. 14 October 2007. Archived from the original on 4 January 2017.
- "Obituary: Bob Denard". BBC. London. 14 October 2007.

=== Bibliography ===
- Abbott, Peter; Botham, Philip (June 1986). Modern African Wars: Rhodesia, 1965–80. Oxford: Osprey Publishing. ISBN 978-0-85045-728-5.
- Andrew, David; Blond, Becca; Parkinson, Tom; Anderson, Aaron (2008). Madagascar & Comoros (Sixth ed.). Melbourne: Lonely Planet. ISBN 978-1-74104-608-3.
- Baxter, Peter; Bomford, Hugh; van Tonder, Gerry (2014). Rhodesia Regiment, 1899–1981. Johannesburg: 30° South Publishers. ISBN 978-1-920143-89-3.
- Binda, Alexandre (May 2008). The Saints: The Rhodesian Light Infantry. Johannesburg: 30° South Publishers. ISBN 978-1-920143-07-7.
- Cilliers, Jakkie (December 1984). Counter-Insurgency in Rhodesia. London, Sydney & Dover, New Hampshire: Croom Helm. ISBN 978-0-7099-3412-7.
- Ellert, H (1989). The Rhodesian front war: counter-insurgency and guerrilla war in Rhodesia, 1962–1980. Gweru: Mambo Press. ISBN 978-0-86922-436-6.
- Malley, Simon, ed. (1984). Afrique-Asie, Issues 311–322 (in French). Paris: Société d'Éditions Afrique, Asie, Amérique Latine. ISBN 978-1-4251-4807-2.
- Martin, David; Johnson, Phyllis (July 1981). The Struggle for Zimbabwe (First ed.). London: Faber and Faber. ISBN 978-0-571-11066-7.
- Moorcraft, Paul L; McLaughlin, Peter (April 2008) [1982]. The Rhodesian War: A Military History. Barnsley: Pen and Sword Books. ISBN 978-1-84415-694-8.
- Thompson, Leroy (October 1991). Dirty Wars: Elite Forces vs the Guerrillas (First ed.). Newton Abbot: David & Charles. ISBN 978-0-7153-9441-0.
- Wood, J R T (April 2008). A matter of weeks rather than months: The Impasse between Harold Wilson and Ian Smith: Sanctions, Aborted Settlements and War 1965–1969. Victoria, British Columbia: Trafford Publishing. ISBN 978-1-4251-4807-2.
