= List of islands of the Comoros by Human Development Index =

Stats of Comorian autonomous islands

This is a list of the three autonomous islands of the Comoros by Human Development Index as of 2023.

| Rank | Island | HDI (2023) |
Medium human development
| 1 | Grande Comore | 0.624 |
| 2 | Moheli | 0.620 |
| – | Comoros | 0.586 |
| 3 | Anjouan | 0.578 |

== See also ==
- List of countries by Human Development Index
