= Robert Coeffe =

Upper Voltan officer and politician (born 1912)

Robert Coeffe (born 1912) was an Upper Voltan military official and politician. He served in the French Army for 25 years, and would later serve as Minister for Ex-Servicemen after the independence of his country.

== Childhood and youth ==
Coeffe was born 1912 in Ouagadougou. After finishing high school in Ouagadougou, he obtained a Higher Primary Education Certificate (CEPS). Coeffe joined the French Army on February 4, 1932.

== Military career ==
Coeffe took part in the military campaigns of the French Army during World War II. He was awarded the Croix de Guerre for service 1939-1940. He later served in Madagascar and French North Africa. Coeffe was promoted to lieutenant on December 25, 1949. He would be awarded the title of Chevalier of the Order of the Star of Anjouan and the North Africa Security and Order Operations Commemorative Medal.

He retired from the French Army on February 4, 1957, completing 25 years of service. The following year he was named Chief of the Military Bureau of the Ouagadougou Circle. In 1959 he was named Chief of the Cabinet at the Ministry for Ex-Servicemen.

Coeffe joined the army of Upper Volta in 1962. In 1962 he was named Secretary of State for the Voltan Armed Forces. He was promoted to Captain on January 1, 1963. He was awarded the title of Chevalier of the Voltan National Order.

== In government ==
Coeffe was named Secretary of State for Defense and Ex-Servicemen in the interim government of Sangoulé Lamizana formed on January 3, 1966. On April 6, 1967 Coeffe was named Minister for Ex-Servicemen. In 1971 the French ambassador presented the title of Officer of the Legion of Honour to Coeffe.
