= 1977 Beninese coup attempt =

Failed overthrow of President Mathieu Kérékou by French-led mercenaries

- Part of the Cold War in Africa
| Date | 17 January 1977 |
| Location | Cotonou, People's Republic of Benin |
| Result | Beninese victory: Coup attempt failed |

Belligerents
| People's Republic of Benin | France (Covertly): Mercenaries; (Benin) Beninese political exiles; Supported by Togo; Ivory Coast; Gabon; Morocco |

Commanders and leaders
| (People's Republic of Benin) Mathieu Kérékou | (France) Bob Denard (WIA) |

On 17 January 1977, a group of French-led mercenaries tried and failed to overthrow the government of the People's Republic of Benin led by Mathieu Kérékou, whose communist party—the People's Revolutionary Party of Benin (PRPB)—was the only allowed political party in the country. The coup, which was also known as Opération Crevette ("Operation Shrimp"), included a failed invasion of the port city of Cotonou by mercenaries contracted by a group of exiled Beninese political rivals.

Bob Denard was the leader of the mercenary group and although Jacques Foccart denied knowledge of the attempted coup after its failure, he did recognize that it was backed by Gnassingbé Eyadéma (Togo), Félix Houphouët-Boigny (Ivory Coast), Omar Bongo (Gabon) and Hassan II (Morocco), all allies of France. Documents accidentally left behind by Denard during the coup attempt further substantiated the involvement of Bongo, Hassan, Eyadéma and French counsellor on African affairs René Journiac.

The coup would be one of several against Kérékou who survived numerous attempts to oust him, including two coup attempts in 1988.

== Links ==
- War is boring: In 1977, 80 Mercenaries Nearly Took Over Benin
