= 1978 Comorian coup d'état =

Deposition of Ali Soilih

Date	13 May 1978
Location	Comoros
Result	Coup d'état successful: Ali Soilih M'Tshashiwa was put into house arrest and later killed.; Ahmed Abdallah and Mohamed Ahmed (Comorian politician) returned to Comoros after three years in exile; The State of the Comoros collapsed; Establishment of the Federal Islamic Republic of the Comoros; Bob Denard becomes de facto military leader of the Comoros

Belligerents
State of the Comoros	Bob Denard's mercenaries

Commanders and leaders
Ali Soilih M'Tshashiwa (executed)	Bob Denard; Said Attoumani

Strength
	50 mercenaries

The 1978 Comorian coup d'état resulted in the successful overthrow of the 3rd President of the Comoros, Ali Soilih M'Tshashiwa, on May 13, 1978. Led by French mercenary Bob Denard and Comorian politician Said Attoumani, the coup was financed by former president Ahmed Abdallah and former vice president Mohamed Ahmed. Following the successful coup attempt, Ahmed Abdallah and Mohamed Ahmed installed themselves as joint presidents. Soon after however, Ahmed Abdallah was named as the sole executive. Soilih was then captured, tortured and killed while trying to escape.

== Background ==
Installed as a populist leader following the ousting of founding president Ahmed Abdallah, Ali Soilih soon alienated the predominantly Muslim population of the country with his radical policies which limited individual freedoms, discouraged religion, and promoted a revolutionary culture. Restrictions under his regime included bans on religious practices and traditional ceremonies, aiming to establish a secular state in line with Maoist principles. As a symbolic gesture of breaking away from the past, President Soilih ordered the destruction of government archives.

President Soilih's policies, combined with the withdrawal of French aid and its civil servants from the country, exacerbated an already dire economic situation characterized by high unemployment and declining living standards.

== Coup attempt ==
From May 12 to May 13, 1978, a group of foreign mercenaries led by Bob Denard staged a coup d'état which resulted in the ousting of President Soilih and the deaths of five people. In the aftermath, a provisional government was formed under the leadership of Said Attoumani, a minister of the Abdallah administration who helped lead the coup. The new government claimed to restore rights previously denied during the Soilih regime, including freedom of religion, the right to hold traditional wedding ceremonies, and the right to freely use personal property.

== Aftermath ==
Following a few days of rule by the provisional government, former president Ahmed Abdallah and former vice president Mohamed Ahmed, both financiers of the coup attempt, returned to Moroni from their three-year exile in Paris and installed themselves as joint presidents, proclaiming the Federal and Islamic Republic of the Comoros on May 24. Soon after however, Abdallah was named as the sole executive.

On May 29, Ali Soilih was shot and killed while reportedly attempting to escape from house arrest. The government claimed that he was fatally wounded while trying to flee with "outside elements". Although other sources claim Soilih was stabbed to death with a bayonet.
