= Ambrières-les-Vallées =

- Commune
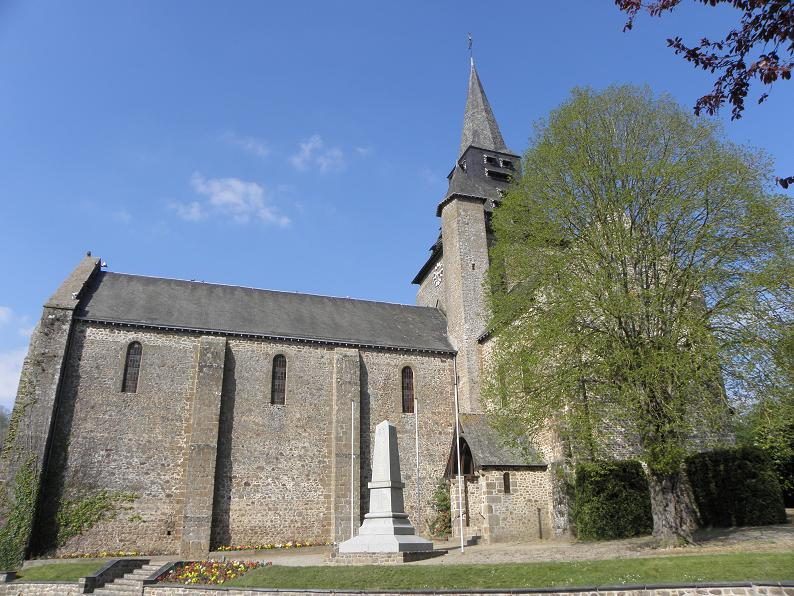
- The church of Our Lady, in Ambrières-les-Vallées

- Coat of arms
- Location of Ambrières-les-Vallées
- Location within France Location within Pays de la Loire
- Coordinates: 48°24′11″N 0°37′46″W
- Country: France
- Region: Pays de la Loire
- Department: Mayenne
- Arrondissement: Mayenne
- Canton: Gorron
- Intercommunality: Bocage Mayennais

Government
  - Mayor (2020–2026): Guy Menard
- Area^{1}: 38.78 km^{2} (14.97 sq mi)
- Elevation: 115 m (377 ft)
- Highest elevation: 162 m (531 ft)
- Lowest elevation: 95 m (312 ft)
- Population (2023): 2,619
  - Density: 67.53/km^{2} (174.9/sq mi)
- Time zone: UTC+01:00 (CET)
  - Summer (DST): UTC+02:00 (CEST)
- INSEE/Postal code: 53003 /53300
- ^{1} French Land Register data, which excludes lakes, ponds, glaciers > 1 km^{2} (0.386 sq mi or 247 acres) and river estuaries.

Ambrières-les-Vallées (French pronunciation: [ɑ̃bʁijɛʁ le vale]) is a commune in the Mayenne department in northwestern France. It is on the border of Normandy.

== Geography ==
The river Varenne flows through the commune.

== Population ==
Historical population

Year	Pop.	±% p.a.
1793	2,961	—
1821	2,519	−0.58%
1846	2,493	−0.04%
1872	2,580	+0.13%
1901	2,395	−0.26%
1926	1,944	−0.83%
1946	1,797	−0.39%
1962	1,610	−0.68%
1968	1,812	+1.99%

Year	Pop.	±% p.a.
1975	2,561	+5.07%
1982	2,679	+0.65%
1990	2,841	+0.74%
1999	2,903	+0.24%
2007	2,773	−0.57%
2012	2,801	+0.20%
2017	2,739	−0.45%
2023	2,619	−0.74%

Source: EHESS and INSEE (1968-2023)

== Notable people ==
- Jacques Foccart, politician and businessman
- Louis Tanquerel des Planches (1810–1862), physician and researcher

== See also ==
- Communes of Mayenne
- Parc naturel régional Normandie-Maine
