= Louis Tanquerel des Planches =

Louis Jean-Charles-Marie-Tanquerel des Planches (11 August 1810, Ambrières-les-Vallées – 27 May 1862) was a French physician.

He is known for his research of lead poisoning, about which, he is credited with conducting one of the first comprehensive studies of occupational illness. By way of analysis of 1200 cases of lead poisoning at the Hôpital de la Charité in Paris, he reported that the disease was more frequently found in workers who were exposed to lead fumes than those who worked with the solid metal. In his studies he used the term encéphalopathie saturnine to point out neuropsychiatric indications of lead poisoning.

== Associated works ==
- Traité des maladies de plomb ou saturnines : suivi de l'indication des moyens qu'on doit mettre en usage pour se préserver de l'influence délétère des préparations de plomb (2 volumes, 1839).
- "Lead diseases / a treatise from the French of L. Tanquerel Des Planches; with notes and additions on the use of lead pipes and its substitutes by Samuel L. Dana Lowell" : Daniel Bixby and Company, 1848.
