= Vanidasan =

Tamil poet

Chevalier, Paavendar Vanidasan
- வாணிதாசன்
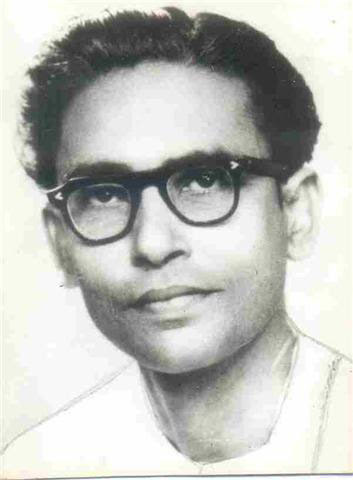
- Born: Arangasamy Ethirasalu; 22 July 1915; Villianur, Pondichéry, French India (now Puducherry, India)
- Died: 7 August 1974 (aged 59)
- Occupations: Teacher, Tamil poet
- Spouse: Adilakshmi
- Parent(s): Father : Thirukkaamu; Mother : Tulsiammal
- Writing career
- Pen name: Rami

Arangasamy Ethirasalu (July 22, 1915 - August 8, 1974), known by his pen name Vanidasan, was a Tamil poet. He was known to be one from Pavalar generation known as 'Bharathidasan's poetic ancestry'. He was an expert in Tamil, Telugu, English and French. He published over 17 collections of poetry, including several novels in poetry form.

== Early life ==
He was born in Villianur, next to Puducherry. His father Thirukkaamu and mother Tulsiammal named him Arangasamy. He was also known by his nickname 'Rami'.

He was taught in primary school by the writer Bharathidasan. He started writing under the pen name ‘Ra-Mi’. He published his songs in the book Tamil Kavithai Kalanjiyam published by Sahitya Akademi and in another book published by the Southern Language Book Publishing Group. His songs have been translated into Russian and English. He was also proficient in French, in which he published Tamil-French Kaiagara Mudali.

In 1935, Vanidasan married Adilakshmi, niece of his step-mother. They had nine children, male and female. The eldest of them, Madhuri, married V Kaliyamoorthy on 10 May 1959 in the presence of Mayilai Sivamuthu.

== Honours ==
He was complimented as the 'Wordsworth of Tamil Nadu' as his songs excelled in portraying nature. He received the Chevalier degree of the Order of the Star of Anjouan from the President of France in 1954. Titles such as 'Pavalar Mani' and 'Paavendar' were also given to Vanidasan. He worked as a Tamil teacher for 34 years of his life. He was also praised by scholar Thiru. V. Kalyanasundaram for his works. Mayilai Sivamuthu lauded him as the 'Tagore of Tamil Nadu'.

== Legacy ==
Vanidasan died on 7 August 1974. His family was given a gift of ₹10,000 (equivalent to ₹300,000 or US$3,100 in 2023) in appreciation by the Government of Tamil Nadu.The government has also nationalised his works. A government high school in Seliamedu was named after him.

== Bibliography ==
1. Iravu Varavillai
2. Inba Ilakiyam
3. Inikum Paatu
4. Ezhil Virutham
5. Ezhiloviyam
6. Kulanthai Ilakiyam
7. Kodi Mullai
8. Siritha Nuna
9. Tamizhachi
10. Theertha Yathirai
11. Thoduvaanam
12. Paataranga Padalgal
13. Paatu Pirakumadaa
14. Periya Edathu Seithi
15. Pokarparisu
16. Vanidasan Poems — First Vol
17. Vanidasan Poetry — Second Vol
18. Vanidasan Poetry — Third Vol
