= Albert Bourgi =

Senegalese-born constitutionalist and academic (1942–2026)

- Born: 4 April 1942; Dakar, French Senegal, French West Africa
- Died: 7 January 2026 (aged 83); Paris, France
- Occupations: Academic; Constitutionalist

Albert Bourgi (4 April 1942 – 7 January 2026) was a Senegalese-born academic and constitutionalist who specialised in public law and international relations.

== Life and career ==
Bourgi was also a columnist for Jeune Afrique and Radio France Internationale, where he discussed the left-wing intellectual tradition and was attentive to social issues, constitutional democracy, and power relations in post-colonial Africa. While he was close to Guinean president Alpha Condé, he publicly opposed his third term, citing a potential weakening of the rule of law.

Bourgi died in Paris on 7 January 2026, at the age of 83.
