= Marcel Henry =

Mayotte politician (1926–2021)

Marcel Henry (30 October 1926 – 30 August 2021) was a politician from Mayotte, France, who served as French senator (1977–2004). He was one of the founders of the Mahoré People's Movement.

== Biography ==
Marcel Henry helped found the Mahoran Popular Movement (MPM) in 1963. He then joined the “Force de l'alternance” (Force for Change), a faction of the Mahoran Departmentalist Movement (MDM), which is a member of the Democratic Movement (France).

He was a French senator, elected in Mayotte, from 1977 to 2004 (re-elected in 1986 and 1995). In the Senate, he sat with the Centrist Union group.

In 2021, at the age of 94, he died in the town of Pamandzi.
