= Sultanate of Bambao =

State on the island of Grande Comore until 1886

The Sultanate of Bambao was a state on the island of Grande Comore. Its capital was the town of Iconi. In 1886, Sultan Said Ali bin Said Omar of Anjouan united the sultanates of Grand Comore into the state of Ngazidja.
