= 1976 Mahoran Comoros referendum =

Referendum rejecting remaining in the Comoros

A referendum on remaining in the Comoros was held in Mayotte on 8 February 1976. The proposal was rejected by 99.42% of voters.

== Background ==
The French National Assembly passed a law on 31 December 1975 allowing for the independence of the Comoros without Mayotte. A referendum was subsequently organised in Mayotte for February 1976 to determine whether residents of the territory wished to remain part of the Comoros or stay under French control.

France vetoed a United Nations Security Council proposal to call off the referendum; this marked the first and so far the only time France has vetoed a United Nations Security Council Resolution on its own. Five nonaligned states had proposed that the Security Council call for the cancellation of the referendum.

== Results ==
Choice	Votes	%
For	104	0.58
Against	17,845	99.42
Total	17,949	100.00
Valid votes	17,949	99.38
Invalid/blank votes	112	0.62
Total votes	18,061	100.00
Registered voters/turnout	21,671	83.34
Source: Direct Democracy
