= Order of the Star of Anjouan =

French colonial order of knighthood

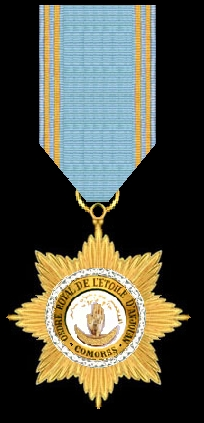
- The medal of the Knight of the order
- Type: Order with five degrees: Grand-Croix (Grand-Cross); Grand-Officier (Grand-Officer); Commandeur (Commander); Officier (Officer); Chevalier (Knight)
- Presented by: France Comoros
- Status: Deprecated 3 December 1963 by the Ordre National du Mérite
- Established: 1 December 1889
- Ribbon of the order

Precedence
- Next (higher): Médaille militaire
- Equivalent: Ordre national du Mérite
- Next (lower): Croix de guerre

The Ordre de l'Étoile d'Anjouan (Order of the Star of Anjouan) was a French colonial order of knighthood founded in 1874.

== History ==
It was established in 1874 by sultan Said Ali bin Said Omar of the Grande Comore island of Anjouan, reorganised on 18 June 1892 and authorised and recognised by the French government on 12 September 1896. It was made a French Overseas Order in 1950.

In this case a local order was adopted by the French, although they reorganised and redesigned it. Another Anjouan order, the Star of Said Ali was not adopted.

The Ordre de l'Étoile d'Anjouan has five classes: Grand-Croix, Grand-Officier, Commandeur, Officier and Chevalier. It was not awarded from the institution of the National Order of Merit on 3 December 1963. It was recreated in 1992 by the independent Comoros.

== Recipients ==
- Grand-Crosses
  - Raoul Magrin-Vernerey
  - Pakubuwono X
- Grand-Officers
  - Marie-Pierre Kœnig
- Chevaliers
  - H. M. Cassime
  - Vanidasan (1954)
