= List of islands of the Comoros =

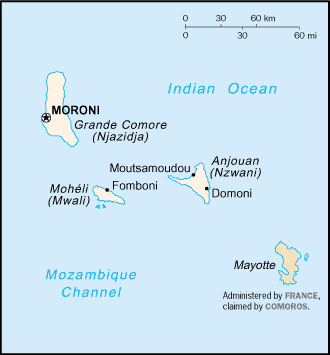
Map of the Comoros

This is a list of islands of the Comoros.

== Major islands ==
- Anjouan
- Grande Comore
- Mohéli

The three islands under the control of the Comoros have the status of autonomous islands (formerly governorates).

- Mayotte (Note: Mayotte is claimed by Comoros, while being a department, region and being administered by the French Republic)

== Minor islands ==
=== Islands located off the coast of Ngazidja (Grand Comore) ===
- Îlot La Tcheka

=== Islands located off the coast of Mwali (Mohéli) ===
- Chissioua Bouélachamba
- Chissioua Bouelamahombe
- Chissioua Mbouzi
- Chissioua Bouelamanga
- Chissioua Chikoundo
- Chissioua Gnandza
- Chissioua Mchaco
- Chissioua Foro
- Chissioua Mea
- Chissioua Bouelamiradji
- Chissioua Mbougo
- Ilot Sanzi
- Chissioua Ouenefou
- Chissioua Kanzoni
- Chissioua Dzaha
- Chissioua Magnougni
- Mbo Mbili

=== Islands located off the coast of Anjouan ===
- Ile de la Selle
- Mchakojou

== See also ==
- ISO 3166-2:KM
