= Said Atthoumani =

1970s Comorian politician

Said Atthoumani was a Comorian politician who served as the fourth president of the Comoros from 13 May 1978 to 23 May 1978 and was the nephew of the nation’s first and second presidents Ahmed Abdallah and Said Mohamed Jaffar

== Political career ==
He served as interior minister of the State of Comoros, (État Comorien), briefly during 1975 when Comoros gained independence, but lost that post when Ali Soilih took power. On May 13, 1978, Atthoumani helped lead a coup in which Soilih was overthrown.

Until 23 May 1978 Atthoumani headed the short-lived provisional government by leading a politico-military directorate which took charge of the State of Comoros. Ten days after the coup, the two men who had financed the coup, former president Ahmed Abdallah (himself the victim of the 1975 coup) and former vice president Mohamed Ahmed, returned to Moroni from exile in Paris. After Atthoumani formally gave up power to them, they installed themselves as joint presidents, renaming the state as Federal and Islamic Republic of Comoros, (République Fédérale Islamique des Comores). Soon thereafter, Abdallah was named sole executive.

Little other information is available about Atthoumani except that several other members of his family were politicians. He was the nephew of Said Mohamed Jaffar, 10th and 11th Chairman of the National Executive Council of the Comoros from August 1975 to 3 January 1976.

== See also ==
- List of heads of state of the Comoros
