= Operation Azalee =

1995 French removal of the Comorian provisional government

Date	28 September – 3 October 1995
Location	Comoros
Result	French victory: Bob Denard arrested

Belligerents
France	Comoros

Commanders and leaders
Jacques Chirac; Charles Millon; Marc Monchal	Bob Denard

Units involved
1st Marine Infantry Paratroopers Regiment; Commandos Marine; National Gendarmerie Intervention Group	French mercenaries; Presidential guards

Strength
600	~300

Casualties and losses
None	4 killed; 9 wounded

Operation Azalee was an expedition staged by France – involving its armed forces and special forces – which took place in 1995 to remove the provisional government of the Comoros that was led and put into power by French mercenary Bob Denard.

== Denard coup ==
Denard's fourth Comorian coup, which he called Operation Kaskari, occurred in the early hours of 28 September 1995. Denard and 33 hand-picked mercenaries docked their ship, Vulcain, at Moroni harbour and descended on the city, forcibly removing the figures of the official government before the ill-equipped army was aware. The invaders had been stowing away on Vulcain for more than a month, and were greeted at their arrival by vans supplied by the relatives of former president Ahmed Abdallah.

The French authorities had some advance notice of the coup, as they had before. But unlike Denard's previous coups, the French government opposed the mercenaries and denounced Denard. Knowing this, Denard's first priority was to prevent a likely counter-coup from France. In addition to political pacification measures, such as forming a civilian government, Denard also tried to recreate the 500-strong presidential guard that he had led after his second coup (1978–1989). Denard's popularity during the early 1980s enabled him to mobilise 300 supporters within five days and place them around ports and airports, where they would be most effective to ambush French invaders with submachine guns.

== Response ==
France had advance knowledge of the coup, but refrained from preventative measures until after it had occurred. As news of the coup came, the French government denounced Denard and his mercenaries. Knowing what they would encounter on the islands, the French did not pursue their extreme numerical advantage, instead handing control to the Special Operations Command. Eventually, 400 marines and 200 other special operations experts began cruising the Indian Ocean in patrol boats and the frigate Floréal, with helicopters and superior logistics.

== Azalee ==
Making landfall at 23:00 on 3 October, the National Gendarmerie Intervention Group immediately sought to overawe the mercenary-dissident alliance. The specialist operators had little trouble in taking both airports, the French embassy and Vulcain, capturing many Denard supporters. Denard was outnumbered and outgunned by the invaders. Although small defending forces had managed to repel attackers in the past, this would usually involve some specific advantage in intelligence, training or guerilla tactics. The special forces encircled the French mercenaries in the barracks in the early hours of 5 October, and Denard was arrested at 15:00 and flown to a Parisian jail. President Said Mohamed Djohar, who was held captive in the barracks, was flown to Réunion for medical treatment. No casualties were reported.

This would be the last of four Denard coups in the Comoros, although another coup would occur on the day Denard went to trial. Since independence in 1975, the Comoros has been subject to over 20 attempts to overthrow the government. This one was only a partial failure in all of the objectives – Djohar was refused re-entry into the Comoros until the 1996 elections, which he lost.
