= Said Mohamed Jaffar =

President of the Comoros from 1975 to 1976

Flag of the "État comorien" under Said Mohamed Jaffar's rule in 1975

Prince Said Mohamed Jaffar (Arabic: سعيد محمد جعفر), full name Said Mohamed Jaffar El Amjad, (April 14, 1918 in Comoros – October 22, 1993) was the second President of Comoros (État comorien) from 3 August 1975 until 3 January 1976, as well as chief minister of the Comoros government from July until December 1972.

== Political career ==
On 3 August 1975 a coalition of six political parties known as the United National Front overthrew the government of Ahmed Abdallah, with the aid of foreign mercenaries led by Bob Denard.

Said Mohamed Jaffar favored a conciliatory approach towards France and the Mayotte issue. On the occasion of the acceptance of the State of Comoros (État comorien) at the United Nations in November 1975 Said Mohamed Jaffar delivered a speech. In January 1976 Jaffar gave up power to radical leftist leader Ali Soilih.

Exiled in France Said Mohamed Jaffar was elected to the French Senate in 1973.

Said Mohamed Jaffar was Said Atthoumani's uncle. Atthoumani led the short-lived provisional government that ruled the Comoros after Ali Soilih was ousted in a coup in May 1978.

== See also ==
- List of heads of state of the Comoros

Political offices
Preceded by Ahmed Abdallah	President of the Comoros; 1975–1976	Succeeded by Ali Soilih
