= Said Ali bin Said Omar of Grande Comore =

19th-century Sultan of Grand Comore

Said Ali bin Said Omar
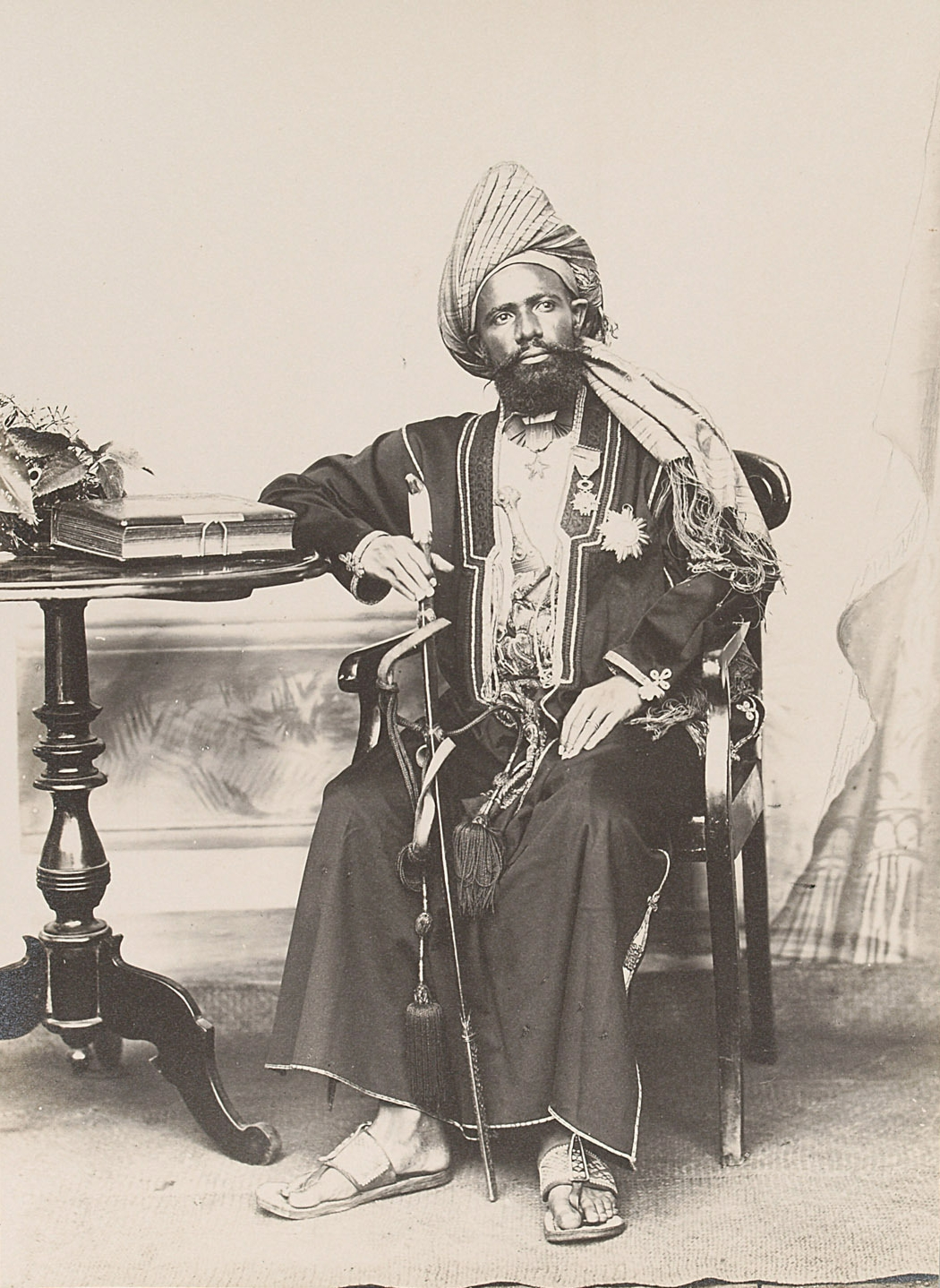
- Said Ali bin Said Omar in 1897

Sultan of Grande Comore
- Reign: 14 April 1892 – 25 July 1912
- Predecessor: Saidi Omar bin Said Hasan
- Successor: Monarchy abolished
- Born: 1852
- Died: 10 February 1916 (aged 63–64); Tamatave, French Madagascar (now Toamasina, Madagascar)
- Spouse: Thouiebat Said Bacar
- Issue: Said Hussain; Said Ibrahim; Said Omar Al-Mansoor

Said Ali bin Said Omar (died 10 February 1916) was the Sultan of Grande Comore. He was the first and last sultan tibe or paramount king of the whole island of Ngazidja.

== Biography ==
In 1841, the island of Mayotte was made a French colony. The French, the British, and the Germans wanted to exercise power and trade on the Comoros.

In 1886, the island of Ngazidja or (Grande Comore in French) comprised nine sultanates, but in 1886, the Sultan (paramount ruler and Sultan) of Anjouan usurped the other sultanates and signed a treaty with French, granting France rights over the entire island. The Sultanates of Ndzuwani (Anjouan), and Mwali (Mohéli in French) became French protectorates the same year and a French résident was posted to each of the three islands.

The Order of the Star of Anjouan (French: Order de l'Étoile d'Anjouan), also known as the "Order of Said Ali", was instituted to reward foreigners with an appropriate decoration in the European style.

On 14 April 1892, Said Ali bin Said Omar became Sultan, but in that year he was banished to Réunion. On 9 April 1908, France declared the Comoros a single territory (Mayotte and Dependencies) and attached it to the colony of Madagascar.

On 25 July 1912, the protectorate was abolished and Ngazidja, along with the three other islands, was annexed by France and the entire archipelago was constituted as a province of Madagascar. This was ratified on 23 February 1914.

Said Ali bin Said Omar went to court, where the French judges awarded him a compensation for his losses.

Saidi Ali ibn Saidi Omar died on 10 February 1916 in Tamatave on Madagascar.

Said Ali married Thouiebat Said Bacar. Their sons were Prince Said Ibrahim, born on 17 April 1911 in Antananarivo, and Prince Said Omar Almansoor. His son, Crown Prince Said Hussein joined the French Foreign Legion on 4 August 1916 during the First World War.
