= Saïd Ibrahim Ben Ali =

Chief minister of The Comoros 1970-1972

Saïd Ibrahim Ben Ali

Prince Said Ibrahim Ben Sultan Said Ali El Maceli Al Ba'alawi (17 April 1911 – 24 December 1975) was a Comorian politician. He served as a member of the French National Assembly from 1959 until 1970, and as Prime Minister of the Comoros from 2 April 1970 until 16 July 1972. He was the son of Sultan Said Ali Bin Sultan Said Omar, Sultan of Grande Comore.

== Biography ==
Ibrahim was born in Antananarivo in Madagascar in 1911. His family included other Comorian politicians like Said Mohamed Jaffar, Said Atthoumani, and Said Ali Kemal.

Said Ibrahim was educated at the Myre de Villers School in Antananarivo, Madagascar, with the view that he would be part of the local administration of the Comoros. He initially became an interpreter, and in 1938, after several requests, he obtained the post as Head of Administration to Grande Comore, then later the High Commissioner to Madagascar.

After World War II, in 1946 he was appointed Governor. He made a pilgrimage to Mecca, remaining in Cairo where he met King Farouk, and visiting Al-Azhar University. In 1947/1948 he sought to organize an Arab League struggle against Israel. In 1951 he stood down, arguably to devote himself entirely to politics. He became the leader of the opposition Parti Blanc (White Party), later reconstituted as the Democratic Assembly of the Comoran People (Rassemblement Démocratique du Peuple Comorien—RDPC), in league with the Comorienne Agreement Party (CEP) of his half brother Prince Said Houssein, and in agreement with the Party of General Charles de Gaulle. He was a member of the French National Assembly. Finally, he was appointed Minister of Finance from 1957 to 1958. In 1959, Comoros got two seats in the French National Assembly, while remaining a single electoral district, and in 1962 and 1967, he teamed up with Mohamed Ahmed in elections. From 1958 to 1970 he was elected and reelected president of the Territorial Assembly and the Chamber of Deputies of the Comoros.

After the death of Sheikh Mohamed Said, he became for a time the strongest politician in the Comoros. He was elected President of the Governing Council on 2 April 1970, and was re-elected on 28 June 1971. Amid calls from all sides of the political elite demanding independence, he maintained that there was "no political independence without economic independence" which implied cooperation between the Comoros and France.

In 1971 the Legislature was hostile to him and he sought and obtained from France the dissolution of the Legislature, but the new assembly sought to overthrow the government in June 1972.

He died in 1975 in Mecca after his pilgrimage. King Faisal of Saudi Arabia - a close friend of the prince - proposed to the prince's family to bury his body in Mecca or Medina. However, his two elder sons (Prince Said Ali Kemal and Prince Naçreddine) preferred to bury their father in the Comoros among his people and therefore King Faisal arranged for his body to be taken back to the Comoros via the King's private jet. Said Ibrahim was buried in his home city Iconi.

He has sons and daughters who are well known politicians, ministers and lawyers: - Prince Said Ali Kemal, Prince Fahmi Said Ibrahim, Prince Mourad Said Ibrahim, Prince Faiz Said Ibrahim and Prince Moncef Said Ibrahim, Princess Sitina-Fatma (Lily), Princess Nourou, Princess Malika, Princess Hanazad, Princess Samira and Princess Thoueibat.

== Legacy ==
Said Ibrahim is commemorated by the Prince Said Ibrahim International Airport, the international airport serving Moroni, capital of Comoros.

The Prince Said Ibrahim Mosque in Ngazidja, Comoros, is named after him.

== Bibliography ==
- Biography at Comores-Online.com (in French) -- Google translation
