= Ali Soilih =

President of the Comoros from 1976 to 1978

- علي صويلح
- Soilih in 1976

President of Comoros
- In office 3 January 1976 – 13 May 1978
- Vice President: Mohamed Hassan Ali
- Preceded by: Said Mohamed Jaffar
- Succeeded by: Said Atthoumani

Personal details
- Born: Ali Soilih M'Tsashiwa; 7 January 1937 Majunga, French Madagascar
- Died: 29 May 1978 (aged 41) Moroni, Comoros

Flag of the "État comorien" under the rule of Ali Soilih (1975–1978)

Logo of the Moissy or "Jeunesse Révolutionnaire".

Ali Soilih M'Tsashiwa (Arabic: علي صويلح; January 7, 1937 – May 29, 1978) was a Comorian socialist revolutionary and political figure who served as the third President of the Comoros from 3 January 1976 until a French-backed coup-d'etat toppled him on 13 May 1978. Soilih was then captured, tortured with a bayonet and killed while trying to escape.

== Biography ==
Soilih was born in Majunga, Madagascar on 7 January 1937. He spent much of his early life there, and was educated in Madagascar and France. During the early 1960s, he traveled to Comoros, where he worked in agriculture and economic development.

=== Rise to power ===
In 1967, Ali Soilih was elected to the National Assembly. In 1970, Ali Soilih entered politics as a supporter of Said Ibrahim, leader of the Democratic Assembly of the Comoran People, Rassemblement démocratique du Peuple Comorien (RDPC). He was appointed minister of equipment and tourism. He soon developed an ideology of hostility towards France as the former colonial power. His ideas were socialist, and he renounced his Islamic faith and became an atheist.

On August 3, 1975, less than a month after Comoros gained independence from France, Soilih overthrew President Ahmed Abdallah and became head of a revolutionary council that took over Comoros. Soilih, whose adherents were barely armed, hired French mercenary Bob Denard to perform that task. He officially became President of the revolutionary council in January 1976 replacing Said Mohamed Jaffar. He acquired extensive powers under the terms of a new constitution and implemented socialist economic policies. In 1977 he held a referendum on his presidency, with 56.63% of voters endorsing it.

=== Revolutionary program ===
Soilih embarked on a revolutionary program that was mainly directed against the country's traditional Muslim society. His vision, based on a mixture of Maoism and Islamic philosophies, was to develop the Comoros as an economically self-sufficient and ideologically progressive modern 20th-century state.

Condemned as wasteful and cumbersome, certain inherited customs of Comorian culture were abolished, like the 'Anda', the traditional "grand marriage", as well as traditional funerary ceremonies, which were criticized for being too costly. Soilih advanced the cause of the youth by allowing young people to take more power. In order to reach his goal, he lowered the voting age to fourteen and put teenagers in positions of responsibility. Among the most striking of his reforms were measures designed to gain the favor of the youth, like the legalization of cannabis and promoting the removal of the veil among the women of Comoros.

Soilih created the 'Moissy', a young revolutionary militia trained by Tanzanian military advisers. The Moissy was a Comorian version of Mao Zedong's Red Guards, and its methods were similar to those that had been employed by their Chinese counterpart during the Cultural Revolution.

=== Consequences ===
Soilih's confrontational policies led to France terminating all aid and technical assistance programs to the Comoros, while traditional leaders of the islands resented the progressive elimination of age-old traditions. The teenage Moissy militia, commanded by a 15-year-old chosen only for his loyalty to the president, behaved with outrageous arrogance, raping any women who resisted their advances and killing anyone who questioned their authority in the slightest. Hence, they were viewed by Comorians as a repressive force. Growing discontent promoted by the political opposition resulted in four unsuccessful coup attempts against the Soilih regime during its two-and-a-half-year existence.

=== Coup d'état and assassination ===
On May 13, 1978, Soilih was finally overthrown by a force of 50 mercenaries, the majority of them former French paratroopers hired by exiled former leader Ahmed Abdallah and led by French Colonel Bob Denard. Abdallah became president, Soilih's policies were reversed, and the name of the country was changed to "Islamic Federal Republic of the Comoros". On May 29, Soilih was shot and killed; according to the government, he had attempted to escape from house arrest. He was 41 years old when he died.

== Aftermath ==
Eleven years later, in 1989, Soilih's older half-brother, Said Mohamed Djohar, overthrew Abdallah, possibly with the help of Denard. He served as president of the Comoros until 1996.

The effects of the social policies of Ali Soilih are still apparent throughout the Comoros, particularly on Anjouan.

== See also ==
- List of heads of state of the Comoros

Political offices
Preceded by Said Mohamed Jaffar	President of the Comoros; 1976-1978	Succeeded by Said Atthoumani
