= Mohamed Ahmed (Comorian politician) =

Comorian politician (1917–1984)

Mohamed Ahmed (Arabic: محمد أحمد, Muhammad Ahmad) (July 2, 1917 – January 27, 1984) was a Comorian politician who served as Co-Chairmen of the Politico-Military Directorate alongside Ahmed Abdallah from 23 May 1978 until 22 July 1978 and Co-Chairmen of the Directorate from 22 July 1978 to 3 October 1978. He also served as a member of the French National Assembly from 1962 to 1978. He was a member of the Comorian Democratic Union.

== Biography ==
He was born in Mutsamudu on the island of Anjouan. During the 1950s, he became one of the most important non-French political leaders in the Comoros, and served as vice-president of the government council from 1957 until 1962. After this he became less influential until after Comoros became an independent nation in 1975. Ahmed was a strong supporter of the May 1978 coup in which Ali Soilih was overthrown. He became co-chairman of the directorate which took charge of the government, but lost this position in October 1978 as the other co-chairman, Ahmed Abdallah took complete power.
