= Ahmed Abdallah =

President of the Comoros from 1978 to 1989

Ahmed Abdallah Abderemane
- أحمد عبد الله عبد الرحمن

1st & 4th President of Comoros
- In office 6 July 1975 – 3 August 1975
- Preceded by: Country gains independence, Position created
- Succeeded by: Said Mohamed Jaffar
- In office 25 October 1978 – 26 November 1989
- Prime Minister: Abdallah Mohamed; Salim Ben Ali; Ali Mroudjaé
- Preceded by: Himself as Co-Chairman of the Politico-Military Directorate
- Succeeded by: Said Mohamed Djohar

13th Co-Chairman of the Politico-Military Directorate of the Federal and Islamic Republic of Comoros
- In office 23 May 1978 – 25 October 1978
- Preceded by: Position created
- Succeeded by: Position abolished

Personal details
- Born: Ahmed Abdallah Abderemane; 12 June 1919 Domoni, Anjouan, French Comoros
- Died: 26 November 1989 (aged 70) Moroni, Comoros
- Cause of death: Assassination
- Party: Comorian Democratic Union (until 1982); Comorian Union for Progress (from 1982)

Ahmed Abdallah Abderemane (Arabic: أحمد عبد الله عبد الرحمن, Ahmad Abd Allah Abd ar-Rahman, 12 June 1919 – 26 November 1989) was a Comorian politician. He was a member of the French Senate from 1959 to 1973, and President of the Comoros from 25 October 1978 until his assassination in 1989.

== Early life ==
Ahmed Abdallah Abderemane was born on June 12, 1919 in Domoni, on the island of Anjouan.

== Political career ==
He began participating in the government in the 1940s, while the Comoros were still part of France. He was the President of the general council from 1949 until 1953, and was the chairman of the Chamber of Deputies from April 1970 to June 1970.

== Presidency ==
=== First Presidency (1975) ===
In 1972, Abdallah, now leader of his political party, the Comoros Democratic Union (UDC), became president of the government council and Chief Minister of the Comoros; he served in that position until 6 July 1975, when the islands became independent from France, (with the exception of Mayotte, which voted to remain part of France.) Abdallah became the first president of the independent islands, but was overthrown by Said Mohamed Jaffar in a coup d'état on 3 August 1975. Jaffar, in turn, would be overthrown by Ali Soilih in 1976.

=== Second presidency (1978-1989) ===
Abdallah (who had been living in exile Paris, France) was the nominal leader of the coup staged by mercenary Bob Denard on 13 May 1978. After Said Atthoumani had served as "Chairman of the Politico-Military Directorate" for ten days, Abdallah and Mohamed Ahmed assumed the titles of "Co-Chairmen of the Politico-Military Directorate". On 22 July, their titles were changed to "Co-Chairmen of the Directorate," and on 3 October, Abdallah became the lone chair. Abdallah was in fact a puppet leader with no power to make decisions of his own, and the real ruler of the Comoros was Denard, who served as the commander of the Presidential Guard.

On 25 October, Abdallah assumed the title of president and remained in office until his death, despite three separate coup attempts against him. In 1982, Abdallah had the UDC and all other parties abolished, and a new party, the Comorian Union for Progress (UCP), was set up. The Comoros became a one-party state, with the UCP being the only legal party, the regime became dictatorial, supervised by mercenaries who controlled the country and avoided various coup attempts. Some opponents of the regime were executed or disappeared during this period. The only candidate to be allowed to stand for election, Ahmed Abdallah was re-elected on 30 September 1984, and his party won all seats in the Federal Assembly on 22 May 1987. During this time, Denard proceeded to plunder the Comorian economy as he became the largest single landowner in the Comoros, taking over all the best land, which he then developed into luxury hotel resorts for wealthy Western tourists who wished to enjoy the tropics.

== Death ==
On 26 November 1989, Ahmed Abdallah, 70, was shot dead in his Moroni office under highly disputed circumstances. It is generally believed that Denard had Abdallah assassinated for trying to dismiss him as commander of the Presidential Guard.

=== Trial ===
At his trial in 1999 for Abdallah's murder in Paris, Denard claimed that Abdallah was assassinated by Abdallah Jaffar during a coup led by Ali Soilih's half-brother, Said Mohamed Djohar. Denard was acquitted for a lack of evidence as the judge ruled that the prosecution made only a circumstantial case that Denard was behind Abdallah's murder. Djohar took control of the country the next day. Denard tried to prevent Djohar from assuming the presidency, but this time, France, which found Denard an embarrassment, sent in military forces to gently usher Denard and his mercenaries out of the Comoros.

== See also ==
- List of heads of state and government who were assassinated or executed
- List of heads of state of the Comoros

Political offices
Preceded by position created	Head of State of the Comoros; 6 July 1975–3 August 1975	Succeeded by Said Mohamed Jaffar
Preceded by position created	Chairman of the Directorate; 3 October 1978–25 October 1978	Succeeded by position abolished
Preceded by position created	President of the Comoros; 25 October 1978 – 26 November 1989	Succeeded by Said Mohamed Djohar
