= Bob Denard =

French mercenary (1929–2007)

Colonel Bob Denard
- Born: 7 April 1929; Grayan-et-l'Hôpital, Gironde, France
- Died: 13 October 2007 (aged 78); Paris, France
- Other names: Gilbert Bourgeaud; Saïd Mustapha Mhadjou
- Military career
- Allegiance: France; Katanga; Rhodesia; Comoros
- Branch: French Navy
- Service years: Indefinite
- Rank: De facto military leader of the Comoros and Commander of the Presidential Guard of Ahmed Abdallah; Colonel (in the Comorian Armed Forces)
- Unit: 7 Independent Company (1977–1978)
- Commands: Mercenary units
- Conflicts: First Indochina War; Algerian War; Katanga secession Siege of Jadotville; North Yemen Civil War; Simba Rebellion; Kisangani Mutinies; Operation Crevette; 1978 Comorian coup d'état Rhodesian Bush War; Operation Azalee

Robert Denard (7 April 1929 – 13 October 2007) was a French mercenary. He served as the de facto military leader of the Comoros twice, first from 13 May 1978 to 15 December 1989 and again briefly from 28 September to 5 October in 1995. Sometimes known under the aliases Gilbert Bourgeaud and Saïd Mustapha Mhadjou, he was known for having performed various jobs in support of Françafrique—France's sphere of influence in its former colonies in Africa—for Jacques Foccart, co-ordinator of President Charles de Gaulle's African policy.

Having served with the French Navy in the Algerian War, the ardently anti-communist Denard took part in the Katanga secession effort in the 1960s and subsequently operated in many African countries, including Congo, Angola, Rhodesia (today Zimbabwe), and Gabon. Between 1975 and 1995, he participated in four coup attempts in the Comoro Islands. It is widely believed that his adventures had the implicit support of the French state, even after the 1981 election of the French Socialist Party candidate, François Mitterrand, despite moderate changes in France's policy in Africa.

Born a Roman Catholic, Denard converted first to Judaism, then to Islam, and finally back to Catholicism. He was polygamously married seven times and fathered eight children. Denard had a swashbuckling, larger-than-life image, and the South African journalist Al J Venter called him "a warrior king out of Homer" who achieved the dream of every mercenary by conquering the Comoros in 1978, which he ruled via a puppet president until 1989. Venter believed Denard to be the most successful of the mercenaries in Africa, and certainly one of the best-known.

== Early career ==
After having served with the French Navy as a Quartermaster in the Fusiliers marins during the First Indochina War and in French Algeria, Denard served as a colonial policeman in Morocco from 1952 to 1957. He worked as a demonstrator for washing machines in Paris. In 1954, he was convicted of an assassination plot against Prime Minister Pierre Mendès-France, a left-wing member of the Radical-Socialist Party who was negotiating the end of the Indochina War and withdrawal from Morocco, Tunisia and Algeria, and served 14 months in prison. An adamant anti-communist, Denard then took part in many anti-colonialist conflicts, simultaneously on his own behalf and on that of the French state. Once he was freed from jail, he worked for the French secret services during the war in Algeria.

He began his mercenary career, which was to span three decades, in Katanga, probably in December 1961 when he and other foreign mercenaries were brought in by the leader of the mercenaries in Katanga, Roger Faulques. Denard fought there until the secessionist movement led by Moise Tshombe collapsed in January 1963. Then, Denard and his men moved to Portuguese Angola.

In mid-1963 he was in North Yemen, which was then in the middle of a civil war between a Nasserist government and royalist tribesmen. The royalists were supported by the Western European and Saudi Arabia governments. The French and British sponsored a number of mercenaries to train the royalist volunteers in military techniques, and Denard was among those who joined Imam al-Badr, leader of the royalists.

After about eighteen months Denard returned to the Congo to take employment under Tshombe who was now the prime minister of the central government in Leopoldville from July 1964 till October 1965 when he was dismissed by President Joseph Kasa-Vubu. Denard served for two years in the Congo battling Simba rebels supporting the late Congolese leader Patrice Lumumba, who had been murdered in Katanga in 1961 after having been overthrown by rival politicians and severely tortured while in transit. The Simba rebels were backed by the Chinese and Cubans, including Che Guevara while the central government were tacitly backed by the United States and Belgium. Denard was in charge of his own unit of French mercenaries called les affreux (the awful ones). He became famous after rescuing white civilians encircled by rebels in Stanleyville (modern Kisangani) in 1963. From June 1965 he had the Polish mercenary commander Rafał Gan-Ganowicz under his orders on a one-year contract during the quelling of the Simba rebellion. Denard then supported an attempted secessionist revolt on behalf of Tshombe by Katangan separatists in July 1966.

A year later Denard sided with Katangan separatists and Belgian mercenaries led by Jean Schramme and Jerry Puren in a revolt in eastern Congo to restore Moise Tshombe to power known as the Mercenaries Revolt. The rebels were soon bottled up in Bukavu. Denard was wounded in the initial rising and flew out with a group of more seriously wounded men to Rhodesia. In January 1968 he invaded Katanga with a force of a hundred men on bicycles in an attempt to create a diversion for a breakout from Bukavu.

Denard was involved in mercenary activity in Biafra during the Nigerian Civil War during the late 1960s. From 1968 to 1978 he was employed supporting the government in Gabon and was available to carry out military actions on behalf of the French government in Africa. He may have been involved in a raid against Guinea in 1970. He was involved in a failed coup attempt in Benin (Opération Crevette, or Operation Shrimp), against Mathieu Kérékou, the president of the People's Republic of Benin, in 1977. Although Jacques Foccart denied knowledge of the attempted coup after its failure, he did recognize that it had been backed-up by Gnassingbé Eyadéma (Togo), Houphouet-Boigny (Ivory Coast), Omar Bongo (Gabon) and Hassan II (Morocco), all allies of France.

Denard is known to have participated in conflicts in Rhodesia with 7 Independent Company, Rhodesia Regiment in 1977, Iran, Nigeria, Angola, Zaire and the Comoros, the last-named nation having been subject to more than twenty coups d'état in the past decades. For most of his career Denard had the quiet backing of France and the French secret service which wished to maintain French influence over its ex-colonies.

== The Comoros ==
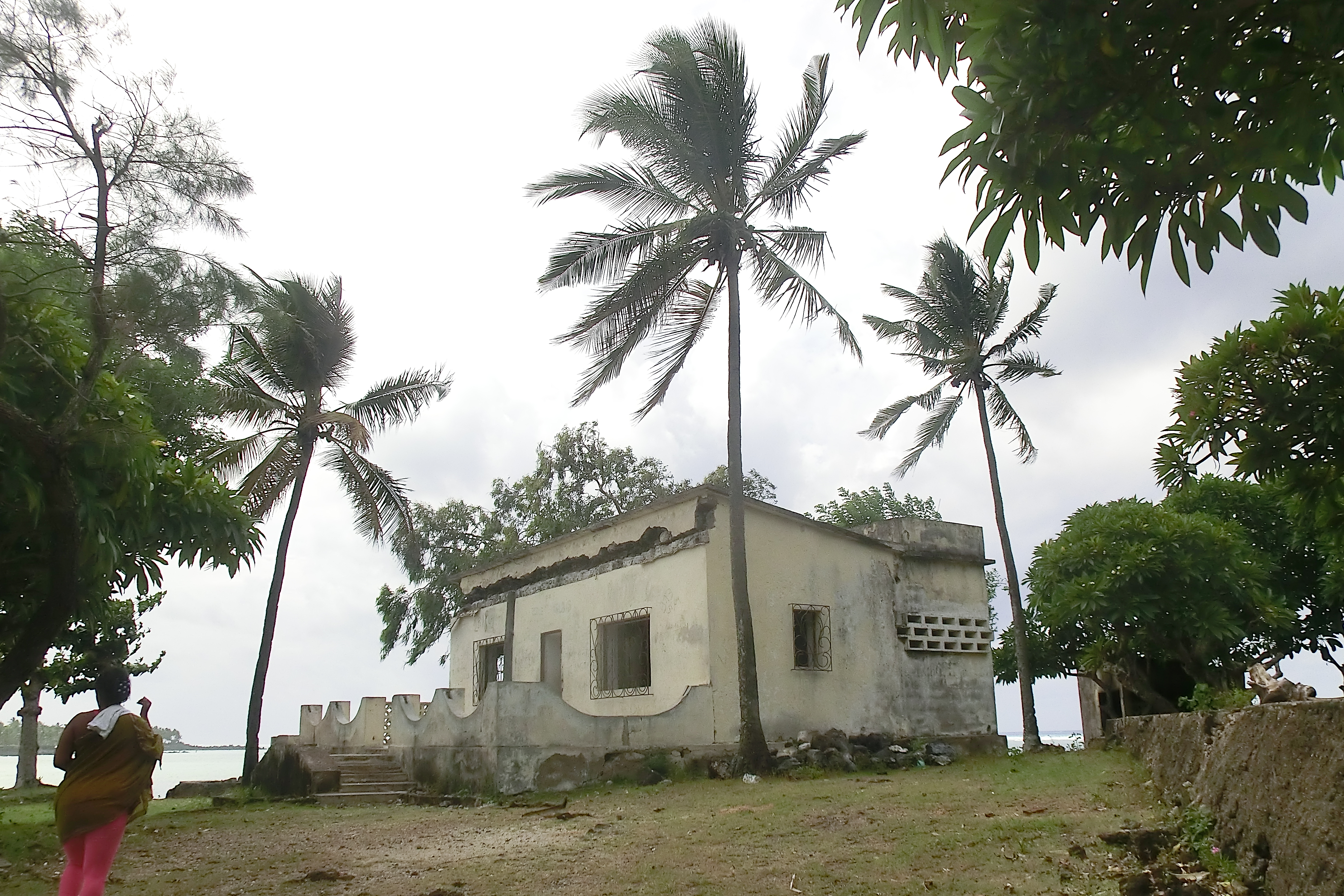
Denard's residence in the Comoros

He was most active in the Comoros, making four separate attempts to overthrow the government of this small island group. On orders from Jacques Foccart, he ousted the first president, Ahmed Abdallah, who had just unilaterally proclaimed the Comoros' independence on 6 July 1975. Ahmed Abdallah was replaced by Ali Soilih.

He then failed at a coup in Benin in 1977 and carried out some operations in Rhodesia from 1977 to 1978 as part of the Rhodesian Army's short-lived French-speaking unit, 7 Independent Company. With the support of the Rhodesian government, he returned to the Comoros with 43 men on 13 May 1978 and carried out a coup against president Ali Soilih, who had turned toward socialist policies. Soilih was killed under mysterious circumstances on 29 May 1978. The official story that Soilih was "shot while trying to escape" is not generally believed. Helped by Denard, Ahmed Abdallah took the presidency back. For eleven years (1978 to 1989), Denard headed Abdallah's 500-strong presidential guard and had strong influence and business interests in the archipelago, marrying and converting to Islam and eventually becoming a citizen of the country. He adopted the Islamic name Said Mustapha Mhadjou upon his conversion.

The Comoros also served as his logistic base for military operations in Mozambique and Angola. He was then supported by Paris, as the Comoros provided France for a base to get around the embargo imposed on South Africa because of its government's policy of apartheid. Denard accumulated considerable holdings in the Comoros, composed of hotels, lands, and the presidential guard. According to Xavier Renou, author of a book on private military contractors, Denard foresaw the transition between traditional mercenaries to contemporary private military contractors, creating a small army during his stay in the Comoros in the 1980s.

=== 1989 coup and subsequent trial ===
In 1989, fearing a probable coup d'état, president Ahmed Abdallah signed a decree ordering the Presidential Guard, led by Denard, to disarm the armed forces. Shortly after the signing of the decree, a military officer allegedly entered president Abdallah's office and shot him, injuring Denard at the same time. A few days later, Denard agreed to leave the Comoros after meeting French businessman Jean-Yves Ollivier, and was evacuated to South Africa by French paratroopers.

Denard then waited in the Médoc region, in France, for his trial for the murder of president Ahmed Abdallah in 1989. With his lieutenant Dominique Malacrino, he had to face charges in May 1999 for his role in the 1989 coup, in which, according to the French prosecution, president Abdallah was killed on the orders of Denard because he was about to remove Denard as head of the presidential guard. The prosecution said Ahmed Abdallah was shot on orders from Denard during a faked attack on his palace on the night of 26 November 1989. But a few days before the trial, Abdallah's family dropped their suit, and finally Denard and Malacrino were acquitted because of lack of evidence. The Comoros experienced its twentieth coup attempt since independence on the day that the trial began.

Afterwards, president Mohamed Taki Abdulkarim declared that he refused Denard's return to the Comoros.

=== 1995 coup and subsequent trial ===
On the night of 27 September 1995 Denard launched a fourth coup Operation Kaskari, in the Comoros. Denard landed on the Comoros with 33 men in Zodiac inflatable boats in an attempted coup against president Said Mohamed Djohar, Abdallah's successor. On 4 October, in accordance with an agreement between France and the Comoros, the French army put an end to the attempt. The French government sent an expeditionary force to capture Denard and his mercenaries. Despite having over 300 armed Comorians ready to fight and having machine gun posts set up, Denard surrendered without a shot being fired. Denard was brought back to France by the French DGSE intelligence agency and spent ten months in a Paris jail. At his trial a number of former Gaullist politicians, including Charles Pasqua, spoke on his behalf.

== Later trials and death ==
In 2001, Guido Papalia, Italian attorney of Verona, prosecuted Denard for having tried to recruit mercenaries in the far-right Italian movement (through Franco Nerozzi) in order to launch a coup against Colonel Azali Assoumani, the current president, also opposed to his return to the Comoros.

On 9 March 2006, attorney Olivier Bray asked for five years of prison for the 1995 coup d'état against Said Mohamed Djohar under the code-name "Eskazi", and sentences between one and four years for his 26 accomplices. During the three-week-long trial, Denard and his accomplices tried to convince the court that they had acted with implicit support of French authorities. Dominique Malacrino talked about the "numerous phone calls of Jacques Foccart, then responsible for the African office at the Elysée palace" to Denard. Emmanuel Pochet, another suspect, declared that Denard had "support from senior officers of the special forces of the DGSE", the French external intelligence agency. Olivier Feneteau, another suspect, declared that he had belonged in the past to the "action service" of the DGSE. On 9 March, Denard's lawyer presented declarations by former president Djohar, who had stated, during an interview to Comorian newspaper Kashkazi at the end of October 2005, that his security chief, Captain Rubis, a French officer that the French authorities had recommended to him, "was aware of the coup".

In June 2006 Denard, who by then was suffering from Alzheimer's, was found guilty of "belonging to a gang who conspired to commit a crime", and was given a five-year suspended jail term. During the trial, the role of the French secret services in the 1995 coup against Saïd Djohar was recognized, but not deemed sufficient to discharge the mercenaries of their guilt. However, the knowledge of the French authorities of the attempted coup was one of the reasons given by the Court to abstain from ordering a firm prison sentence. During his trial in 2006 before the Court of Appeal, a former head of the foreign intelligence service explicitly stated that "When special services are unable to undertake certain kinds of undercover operation, they use parallel structures. This was the case of Bob Denard." In July 2007, he was sentenced by the Court of Appeal to four years in prison (three of them suspended). However, he never served his sentence for health reasons.

His death was announced by his sister on 14 October 2007. In 2011, his story was the basis of the film Mister Bob.

== Religious beliefs ==
Born a Catholic, Denard converted to Judaism in Morocco, then to Islam in the Comoros, and finally back to Catholicism. His funeral took place at the Paris church of Saint-François Xavier.

== See also ==
- History of Comoros

== Bibliography ==
- Samantha Weinberg: Last of the pirates; in search of Bob Denard. London, 1994. ISBN 0-224-03307-7
- Christopher Othen: Katanga 1960–63; Mercenaries, Spies and the African Nation that Waged War on the World. London 2015 ISBN 0750962887
- Venter, A.J. (2006). War Dog: Fighting Other People's Wars: The Modern Mercenary in Combat. New Delhi: Lancer. ISBN 8170621747..
- Katia Denard, Si on te demande, tu diras que tu ne sais pas, Mon Père, Bob Denard, récit., Anne Carrière, 2011, 217 p. ISBN 978-2-84337-455-5
