= Abdallah I of Anjouan =

Sultan of Anjouan Island (1782–1788 and 1792–1796)

Abdallah I was the Sultan of Anjouan island (in the Comoros Islands) two times: 1782-1788 and 1792–1796.

In 1788, he abdicated in favor of his granddaughter Halima.

He ruled a second time from 1792 to 1796.

Preceded by Saidi Ahmad	Sultan of Anjouan; 1782–1788	Succeeded by Halima IV
Preceded by Halima IV	Sultan of Anjouan; 1792–1796	Succeeded by Alawi bin Husain
