= Camille Paule =

Husband of Queen (Sultan) of Mohéli (Mwali)
- Reign: 1901–1909
- Predecessor: Sayyid Muhammad bin Nasser Al-Busaidi
- Successor: French colonialism
- Born: 1 March 1867; Pesmes
- Died: 22 September 1946 (aged 79); Champagney, Jura
- Spouse: Salima Machamba (1874–1964)
- Issue: 1. Henriette Camille Ursule Louise (1902−1989); 2. Louis Camille (1907−1983); 3. Camille Fernand (1917−2007)
- House: Dynasty of Merina
- Father: N. Paule
- Mother: N. N.

Camille Paule (1 March 1867 – 22 September 1946) was the husband of Salima Machamba, sultan (queen) of Mohéli (Mwali) (1901–1909). He was a French gendarme.

== Life ==
He was born on 1 March 1867 in Pesmes. He was a French gendarme in Saint Denis, Réunion where Salima Machamba, sultan (queen) of Mohéli (Mwali) resided, and she fell in love with and on 28 August 1901 married him, in Saint Denis, Réunion. In 1909 his wife was deposed by the French government and Comoros was annexed by France. The queen was deported with her family to France. Her wife gave birth to three children. The French government provided his wife a yearly allowance of 3,000 gold Francs. They lived as simple farmers in Haute-Saône, and he died in Champagney on 22 September 1946.

Their grave with his wife in Pesmes

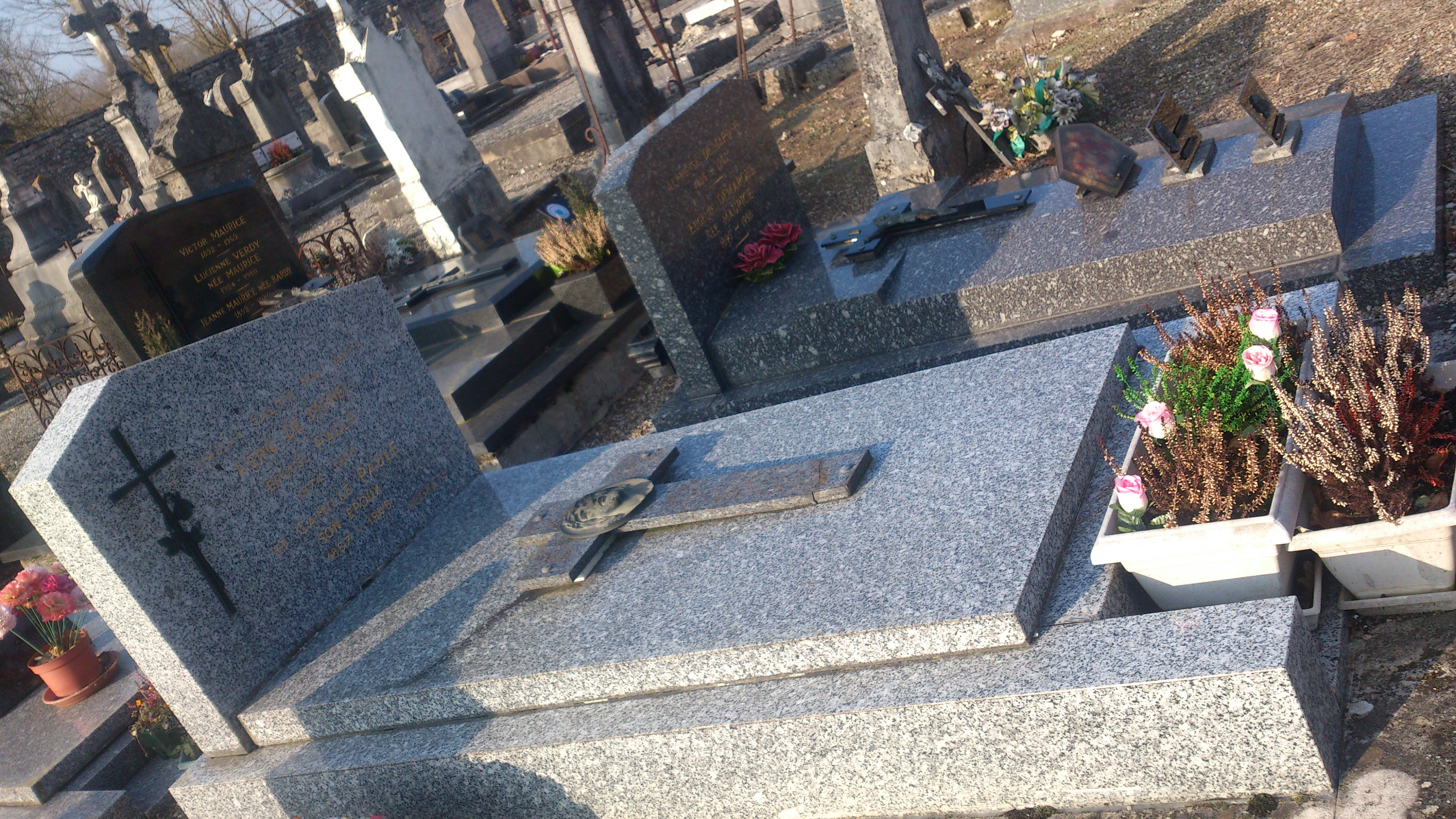

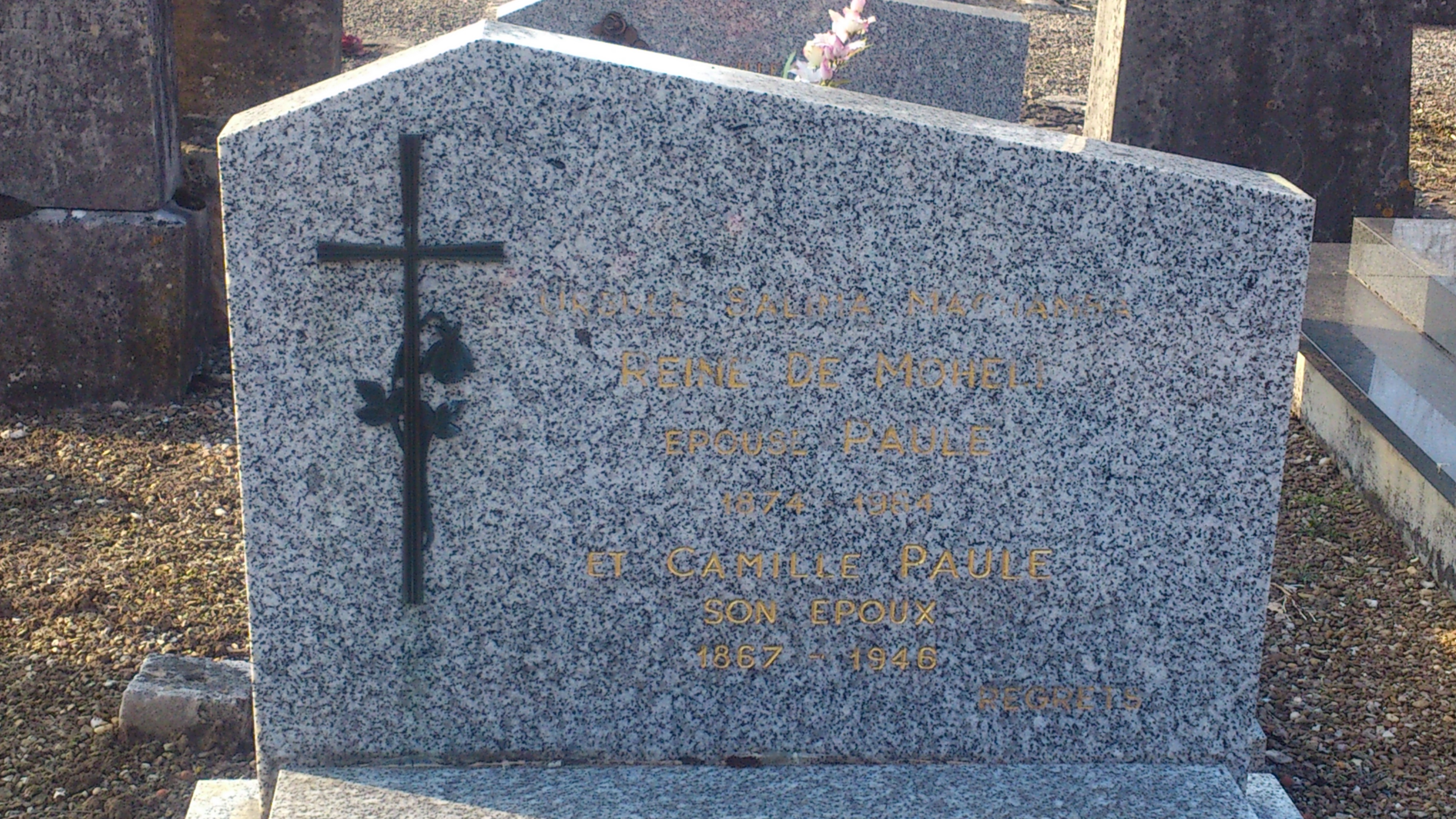

== Children ==
- From her marriage to Salima Machamba (1874–1964), sultan (queen) of Mohéli (Mwali), three children:
  - Henriette Camille Ursule Louise (Cléry, Côte-d'Or, 15 July 1902 − Dijon, Côte-d'Or, 4 April 1989), Princess of Mohéli, she has a daughter:
    - Christiane
  - Louis Camille (Cléry, Côte-d'Or, 1 September 1907 − Dole, Jura, 8 April 1983), Prince of Mohéli, he has a daughter:
    - Anne Ursule (1941– ), President of Association Développement des Iles Comores, wife of Jean–François Etter
  - Camille Fernand (Cléry, Côte-d'Or, 16 June 1917 − Dijon, 1 April 2007), Prince of Mohéli

== Bibliography ==
- Nivois, Julienne: A Pesmes, en Franche-Comté..., Une Reine oubliée par l'Histoire, Éditions Dominique Guéniot, Paris, 1995.

Camille Paule Dynasty of Merina Born: March 1867 Died: September 1946
Regnal titles
Preceded by Sayyid Muhammad bin Nasser Al-Busaidi	Husband of Queen (Sultan) of Mohéli (Mwali); 1901–1909	Succeeded by French colonialism
