= Djoumbé Fatima =

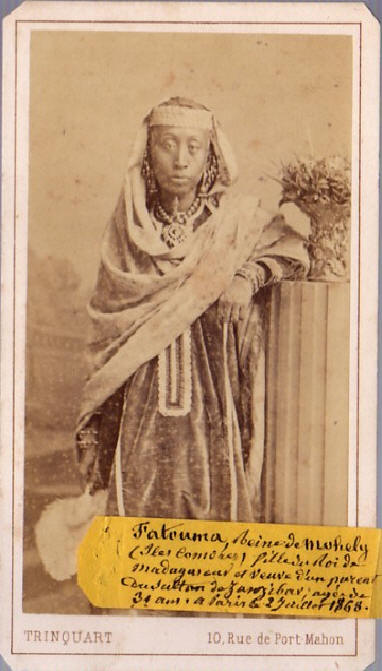
- Photograph of Djoumbé Fatima taken in Paris in 1868

Sultan of Mohéli (Mwali)
- Reign: 1842–1865; 1874–1878
- Coronation: 26 May 1849, Fomboni
- Predecessor: Ramanetaka; Muhammad bin Saidi Hamadi Makadara
- Successor: Muhammad bin Saidi Hamadi Makadara; Abderremane bin Saidi Hamadi Makadara
- Born: 1836/37; Ouallah, Mohéli
- Died: 1878 (aged 40–41)
- Consort: Said Muhammad bin Nasser Makadara
- Issue: Muhammad bin Saidi Hamadi Makadara; Abderremane bin Saidi Hamadi Makadara; Mahmud bin Mohamed Makadara; Prince Bakoko; Salima Machamba
- Dynasty: Merina
- Father: Ramanetaka
- Mother: Ravao

Djoumbé Fatima (c. 1837–1878), also known as Djoumbé Soudi or Queen Jumbe-Souli, was the Sultana of Mohéli in Comoros from 1842 to 1865 and 1874 to her death in 1878.

== Early life ==
Jumbe-Souli inherited the throne of the island of Moheli (Mwali) after the death of her father, King Ramanateka-Rivo, also known as Sultan Abderahmane. Ramanateka was a Malagasy prince who ran away from Madagascar after the death of King Radama I. She was also a cousin of King Radama II. She had a sister, Jumbe-Salama, who died young.

Her mother, Ravao (daughter of Andriantsiahofa, of Imamo West) was Merina of Madagascar. Her father, Field-Marshall Ramanetaka, was brother-in-law to Radama I, King of Madagascar. He died in 1842 and Djoumbé ascended to the throne. Her mother, Ravao, ruled as regent for a time and married her husband's former adviser, General Ratsivandini, in 1843. Ravao died by poison in 1847. He became Djoumbé's tutor and started making arrangements for her marriage to the sultan of Zanzibar.

== Reign ==
When the missionary David Griffiths returned to Moheli in 1841, expecting to meet her father he in fact found his young daughter Jumbe-Souli on the throne. Jumbe-Souli, like the majority of people on the island was Muslim and did not convert to Christianity.

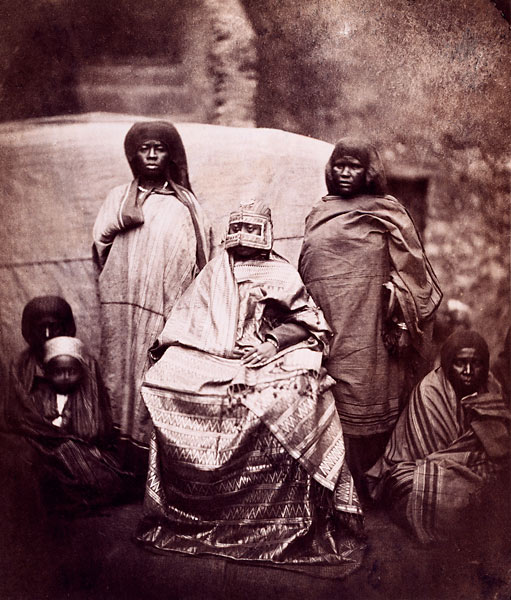
Queen Jumbe-Souli receiving a French delegation in 1863

Ravao and Tsivandini divorced in 1846. Mayotte had recently been ceded to France, and the French, eager to develop their presence on Mohéli, arranged for a Madame Droit to serve as governess for Djoumbé. The French also arranged for her coronation at the age of 12, in 1849. Two years later she expelled the governess and married Saïd Mohammed Nasser M'Kadar, who was cousin to Zanzibar's sultan. M'Kadar became prince consort and ruled with Fatima until 1860, when he was ousted by the French. Fatima held on to the throne, marrying two sultans. She renounced the throne for her son.

In 1863, the French government sent a delegation to meet with Queen Jumbe-Souli and the event was recorded by a visiting photographer Désiré Charnay. He recorded that she seemed "melancholy and sickly" and had a number of attendants. She was dressed extremely finely in a "robe of rich Turkish tissue of silk and gold". Her dress covered most of her face, with only her hand visible. The purpose of the visit had been to impress upon the young queen the advantages of becoming a French colony; she resisted. Jumbe-Souli lived in the palace, overlooking the sea, next to which was the garrison - a white building of two rooms, which held 28 soldiers.

When the French returned in 1871, she was restored to the throne and ruled until her death in 1878.

== Children ==
- From her marriage to Said Muhammad bin Nasser Makadara, Prince Consort and Regent of Mohéli, Counsellor to Sayyid Sa’id bin Sultan, Sultan of Oman and Zanzibar, three sons:
  - Mohamed bin Saidi Hamadi Makadara (c. 1859 − 1874), Sultan of Mohéli (1865–1874)
  - Abderremane bin Saidi Hamadi Makadara (c. 1860 − 1885), Sultan of Mohéli (1878–1885)
  - Mahmudu bin Mohamed Makadara (Fomboni, 1863 − Saint-Denis, Réunion, 18 October 1898), Regent of Mohéli for her halfsister, Sultana Salima Machamba (18 September 1889 – 9 October 1897), he had a son:
    - Manini, Prince of Mohéli
- From her relationship to Emile Fleuriot de Langle (1837–1881, assistant to explorer Joseph-François Lambert), two children:
  - Bakoko (–1901), Prince of Mohéli
  - Salima Machamba (Fomboni, 1 November 1874 – Pesmes, Haute-Saône, France, 7 August 1964), Sultana of Mohéli (1888–1909), married at Saint-Denis, Réunion to French gendarme Camille Paule (Pesmes, 1 March 1867 – Champagney, Jura, 22 September 1946) on 28 August 1901, and she had three children

Djoumbé Fatima Dynasty of Merina Born: 1837 Died: 1878
Regnal titles
Preceded by Ramanetaka; Mohamed bin Saidi Hamadi Makadara	Queen (Sultan) of Mohéli (Mwali); 1842–1865; 1874–1878	Succeeded by Mohamed bin Saidi Hamadi Makadara; Abderremane bin Saidi Hamadi Makadara
