= Fomboni =

Capital of Mwali, Comoros

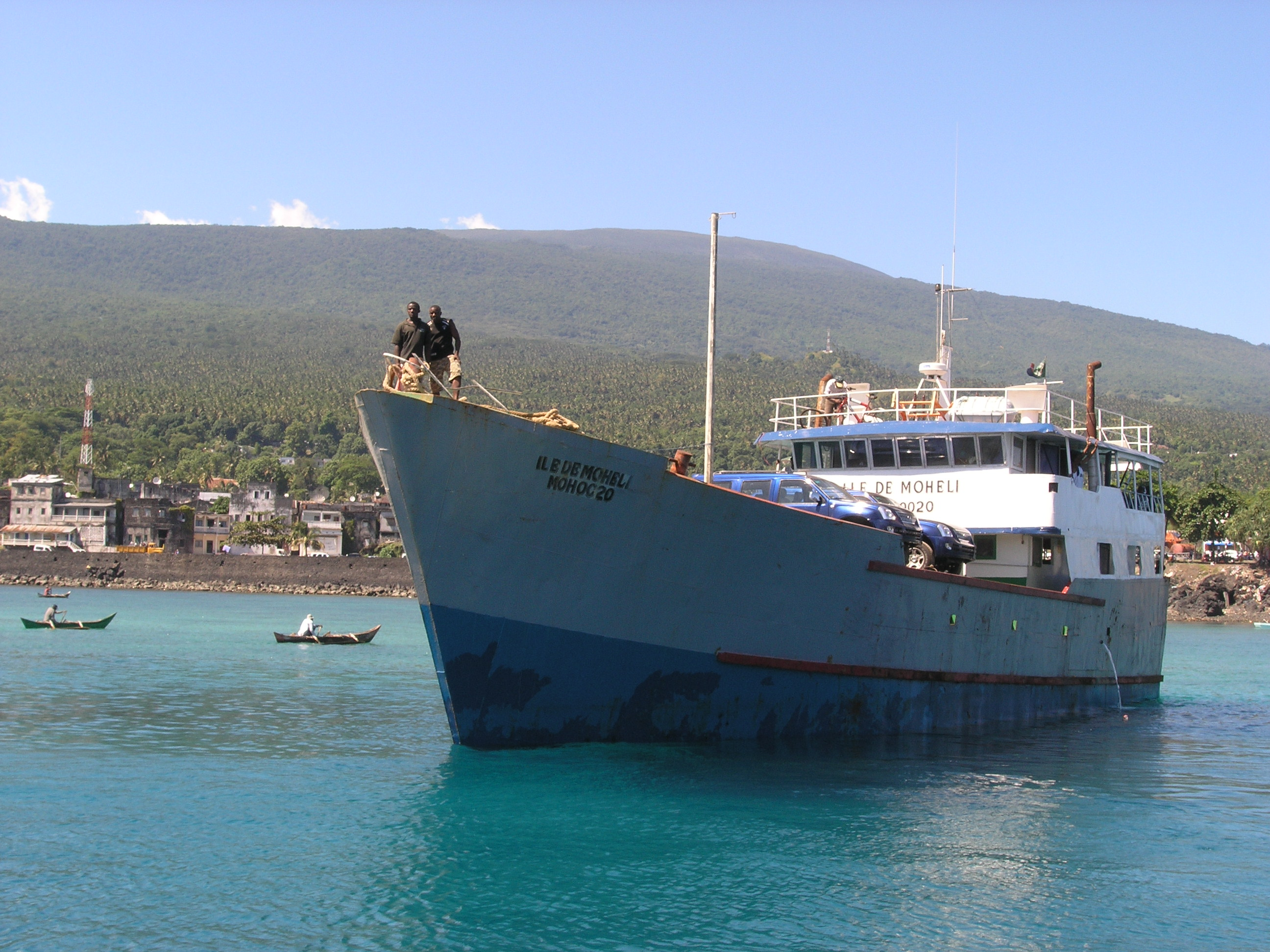
- The ship Île de Mohéli in the port of Fomboni in May 2008

- Location of Fomboni on the island of Mohéli
- Coordinates: 12°16′48″S 043°44′33″E
- Country: Comoros
- Island: Mohéli

Population (2012)
  - Total: 18,277
- Time zone: UTC+3 (Eastern Africa Time)
- Area code: 269

Fomboni (population approximately 19,000) is the fifth-largest city in the Comoros. It is also the capital and largest city on the Autonomous Island of Mohéli, of which it makes up more than one third of the population. Characterized as quiet, it is home to an old market and a jetty.

Fomboni is the namesake of the 2001 Comorian Constitution, so-called the "Fomboni Accords".

== Infrastructure ==
The majority of buildings in Fomboni are small, single-story buildings. Two kilometers to the East is Mwali's only airport, Mohéli Bandar Es Eslam Airport, located in the neighboring village of Djoezi. Along the main road are a post office, banks, a hospital, and the market.

== Culture ==
Fomboni is home to the Fomboni FC football club. The Alliance française has an institution in Fomboni.

== Climate ==
Like the rest of the island, Fomboni has a tropical marine climate. Its hot and wet season runs from November to April, though temperatures throughout the year vary little, with an average yearly minimum of 19 °C and a maximum of 32 °C. Like other coastal Comorian settlements, Fomboni is at risk of the periodic tropical cyclones which move through the Mozambique Channel. Fomboni receives about 2000 mm of rainfall per year.

== Notable people ==
- Salima Machamba, Sultana of Moheli from 1888 - 1909. Final sultan of the Island prior to French rule.
- Djoumbe Fatima, Sultana of Moheli
- Abderremane, Sultan of Mohéli
- Malaga Soulaimana, Footballer
- Salimo Velonjara, Footballer
- Faouz Faidine Attoumane, Footballer

== Transport ==
Fomboni is serviced by Mohéli Bandar Es Eslam Airport, located approximately 3 km away in the town of Djoezi.
