= Salima Machamba =

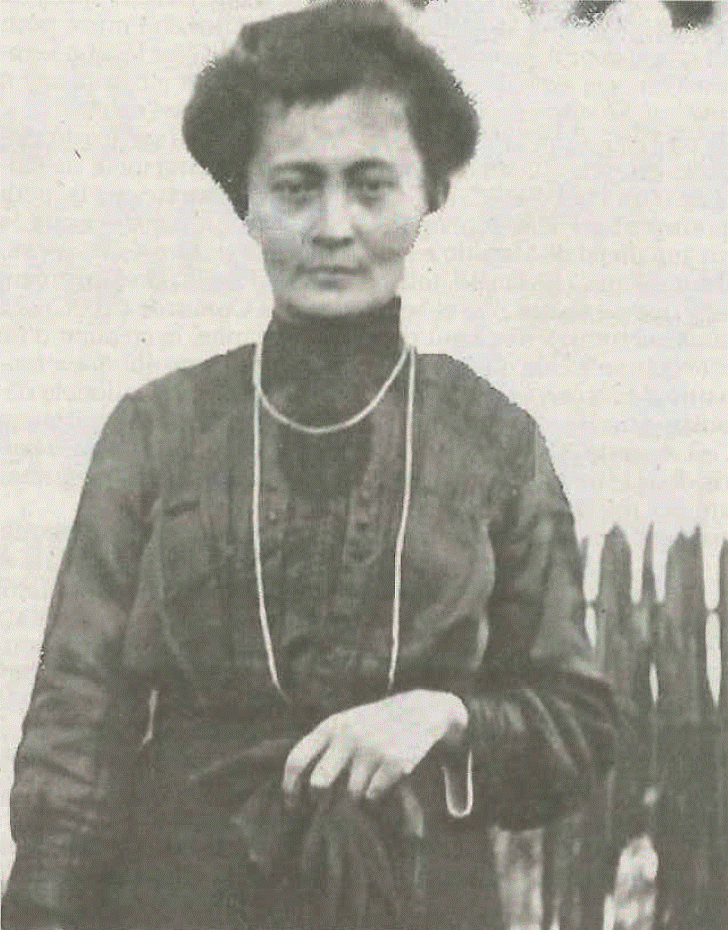
- Salima Machamba in 1920 during her exile in France

Queen (Sultan) of Mohéli (Mwali)
- Reign: 1888–1909
- Predecessor: Marjani bin Abudu Shekhe
- Successor: Monarchy abolished (Mohéli annexed by France)
- Born: 1 November 1874; Fomboni, Mohéli
- Died: 7 August 1964 (aged 89); Pesmes, Haute-Saône, France
- Burial: 10 August 1964; L'église Saint-Hilaire, Pesmes
- Consort: Camille Paule (m. 1901; died 1946)
- Issue: Princess Louise of Mohéli; Prince Louis of Mohéli; Prince Fernand of Mohéli
- Dynasty: Merina
- Father: Emile Fleuriot de Langle
- Mother: Jumbe Fatima bint Abderremane, Sultan of Mohéli (1836/37–1878)
- Religion: Roman Catholicism

Salima Machamba (1 November 1874, Fomboni – 7 August 1964, Pesmes) was sultan of Mohéli (Mwali) in 1888–1909. Her official paternal name was Salima Machamba bint Saidi Hamadi Makadara. She was a relative of Ranavalona I, Queen of Madagascar.

== Life ==
Salima Machamba was born on 1 November 1874 in Fomboni, to Jumbe Fatima bint Abderremane, Queen (Sultan) of Mohéli (Mwali) and Emile Fleuriot de Langle, a great-grandson of Paul Antoine Fleuriot de Langle. She was born out of wedlock, but officially bore the name of her mother's husband and was recognised as Salima Machamba bint Saidi Hamadi Makadara.

She was chosen as the puppet queen of Mohéli by the French, who made Comoros a French protectorate. She fell in love with and married on 28 August 1901 Camille Paule, a French gendarme, in Saint Denis, Réunion. In 1909 she was deposed by the French government and Comoros was annexed by France.

She was deported with her family to France. She gave birth to three children. Their names were Henriette, Louis Camille, and Camille Fernand, born between 1902 and 1917. The French government provided her with a yearly allowance of 3,000 gold Francs. She lived as a simple farmer in Haute-Saône, and died in Pesmes on 7 August 1964. She was buried at L'église Saint-Hilaire, Pesmes on 10 August 1964. Her granddaughter Anne Etter represents the royal family of Mohéli in Comoros as the president of Association Développement des Iles Comores.

Their grave with her husband in Pesmes

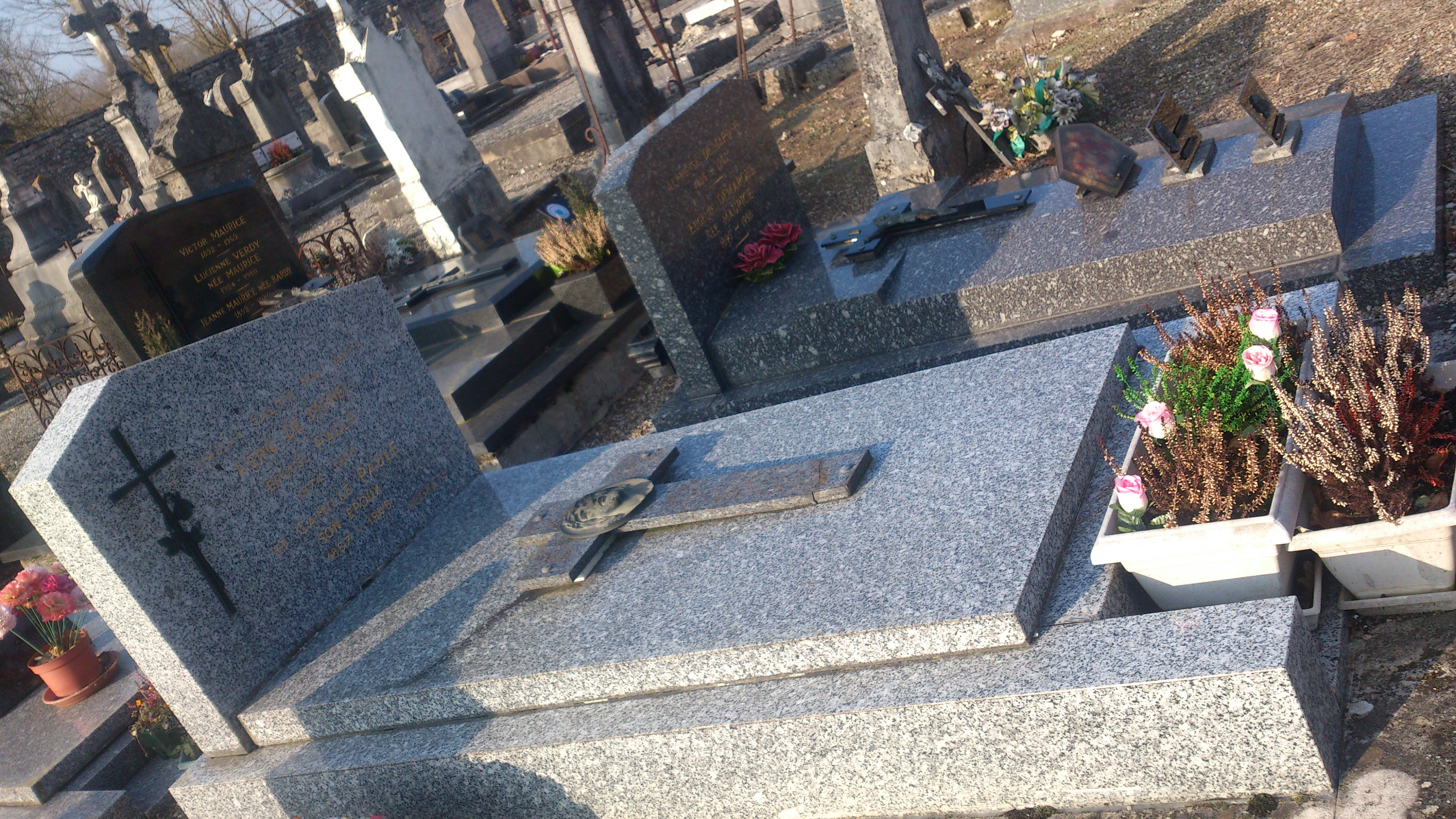

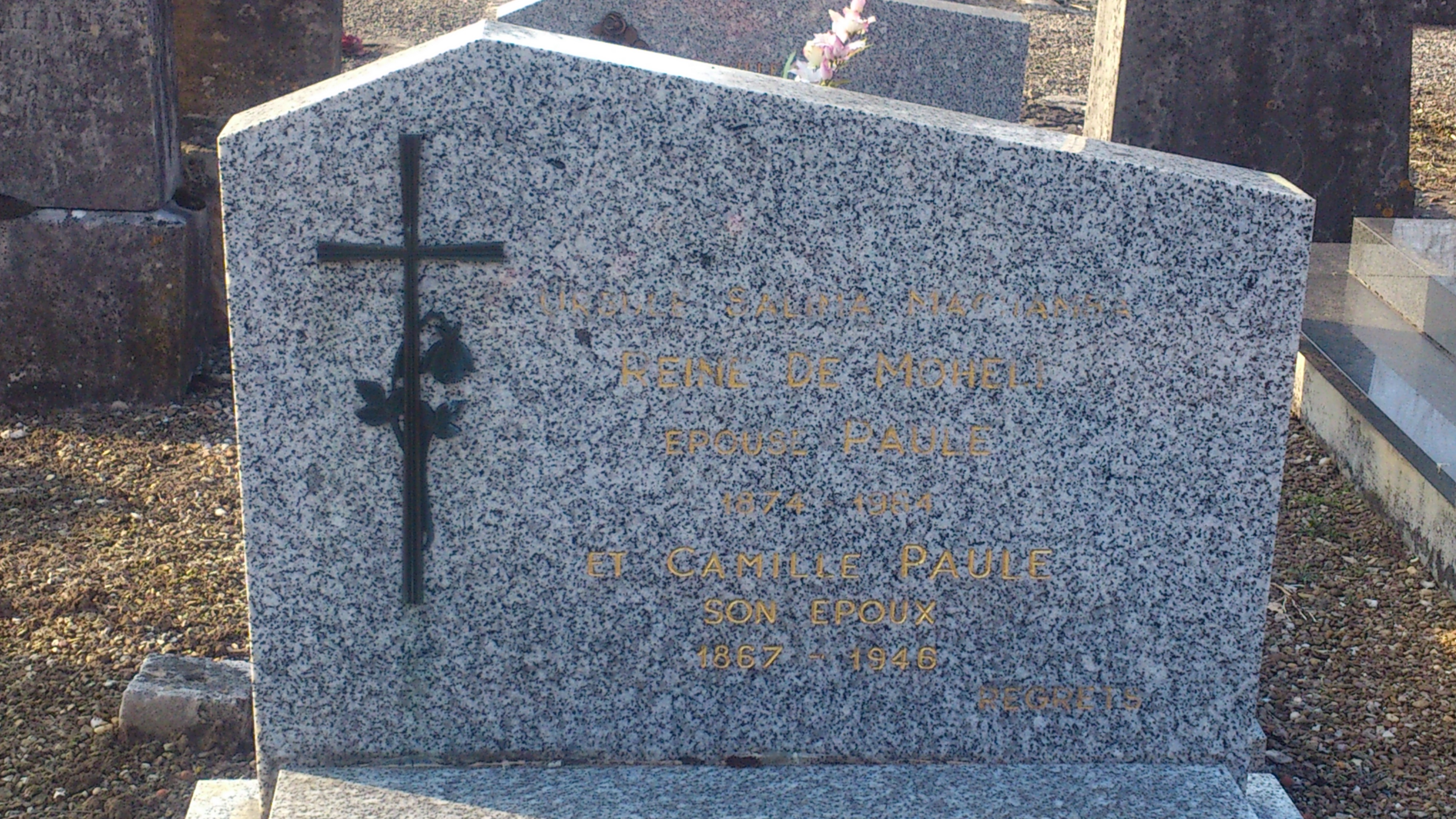

== Children ==
Her marriage to Camille Paule resulted in three children:

- Henriette Camille Ursule Louise Paule (15 July 1902, Cléry, Côte-d'Or − 4 April 1989, Dijon), Princess of Mohéli, she has a daughter:
  - Christiane
- Louis Camille Paule (1 September 1907, Cléry, Côte-d'Or − 8 April 1983, Dole, Jura), Prince of Mohéli, he has a daughter:
  - Anne Ursule Etter (born 1941), President of Association Développement des Iles Comores, wife of Jean–François Etter
- Camille Fernand Paule (16 June 1917, Cléry, Côte-d'Or − 1 April 2007, Dijon), Prince of Mohéli

== Bibliography ==
- Nivois, Julienne: A Pesmes, en Franche-Comté..., Une Reine oubliée par l'Histoire, Éditions Dominique Guéniot, Paris, 1995.

Salima Machamba Dynasty of Merina Born: November 1874 Died: August 1964
Regnal titles
Preceded by Marjani bin Abudu Shekhe	Sultan of Mohéli (Mwali); 1888–1909	Succeeded by French colonialism
