= Battle of Pesmes =

- Part of Franco-Prussian War
Date	16–18 December 1870
Location	Pesmes, Haute-Saône, France 47.278°N 5.566°E
Result	German Victory

Belligerents
French Republic	North German Confederation: Prussia

Strength
Unknown	7 companies of the 25th Regiments, several Uhlans and heavy artillery

The Battle of Pesmes was part of the Franco-Prussian War. It took place from December 16 to 18, 1870, at the French commune of Pesmes, on the river Ognon between Gray and Dole. The Prussian army, which included Uhlans (light cavalry) and artillery, defeated the French army and achieved their goal of destroying the bridge over the Ognon river. Simultaneously, the Prussian army under the command of General August von Werder captured Nuits-Saint-Georges from the hands of French commander, Camille Crémer on 18 December 1870.

== Battle ==
On December 16, 1870, a company of the Landwehr militia was sent to Pesmes with engineers, in order to destroy the bridge over the river Ognon. They met strong resistance from the two French battalions defending the Ognon crossing, delaying their attempts. The following day, December 17, the Prussians sent a larger force: 7 companies of the 25th Regiment, a German Uhlan lance cavalry, and a battery of heavyweight artillery. The French opened fire on one of the cavalrymen, but retreated back across the river when the Prussians began throwing grenades towards them.

The German army then advanced to capture Pesmes, with part of the forces crossing the Ognon and engaging the French in villages and forests, forcing a further French retreat and inflicting casualties.

On the afternoon of December 18, the German outpost at Ognon was counter-attacked by the French. However, the German army was able to break their advance. The French army suffered multiple casualties, including their commander.

After the fighting, the German army remained in Pesmes until December 20, when, having completed the demolition of the bridge over the river, they withdrew from their temporary defensive positions.
