= Clairegoutte (river) =

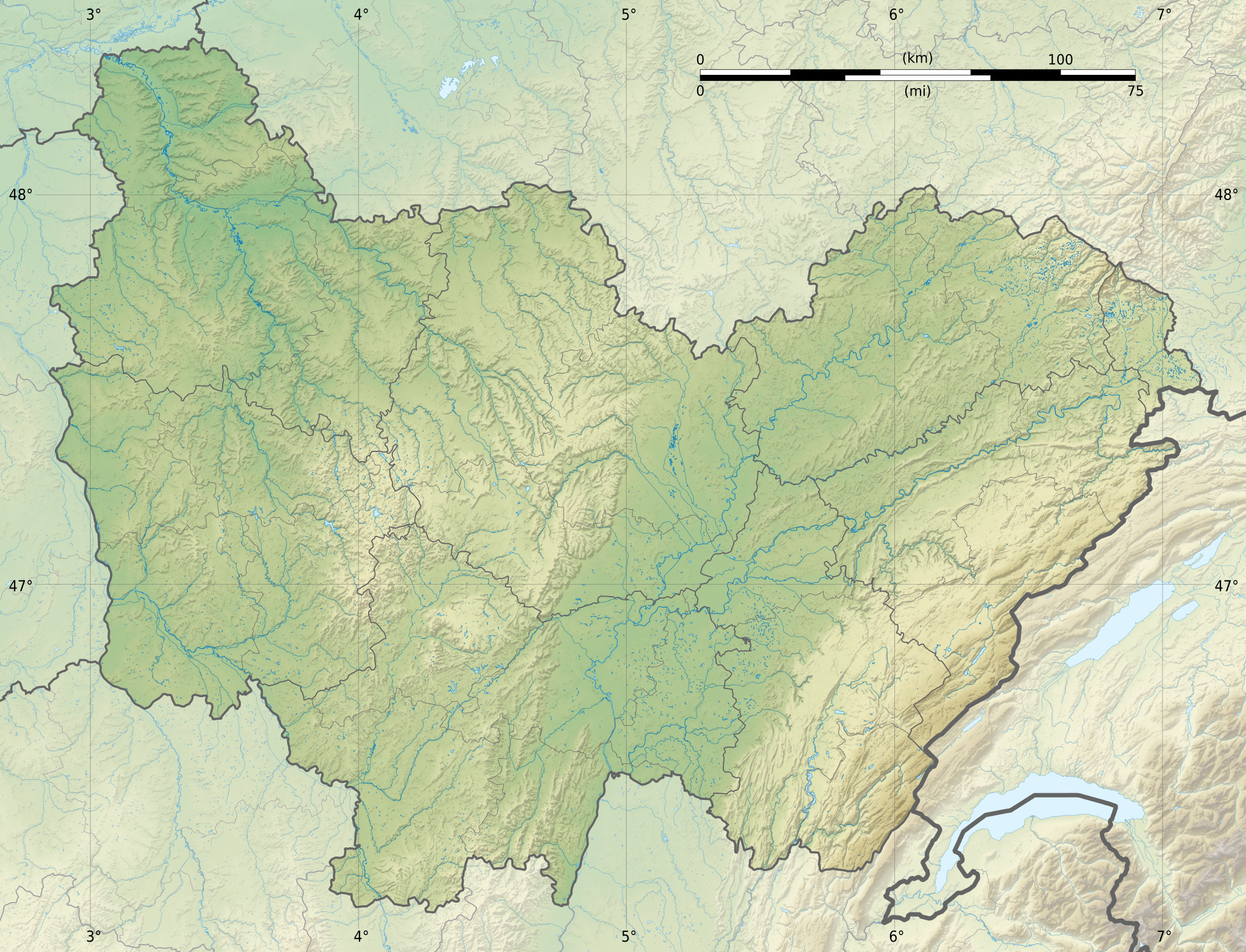
- Location within France Location within Bourgogne-Franche-Comté

Location
- Country: France

Physical characteristics
- Mouth: Rognon
  - coordinates: 47.6442°N 6.5786°E
- Length: 6.7 km (4.2 mi)

Basin features
- Progression: Rognon→ Scey→ Ognon→ Saône→ Rhône→ Mediterranean Sea

The Clairegoutte (French pronunciation: [klɛʁɡut]) is a 6.7 km river in the Haute-Saône department in the Franche-Comté region of eastern France. It arises near Clairegoutte and flows generally west to join the Rognon in Lyoffans.
