= Beveuge =

- Commune
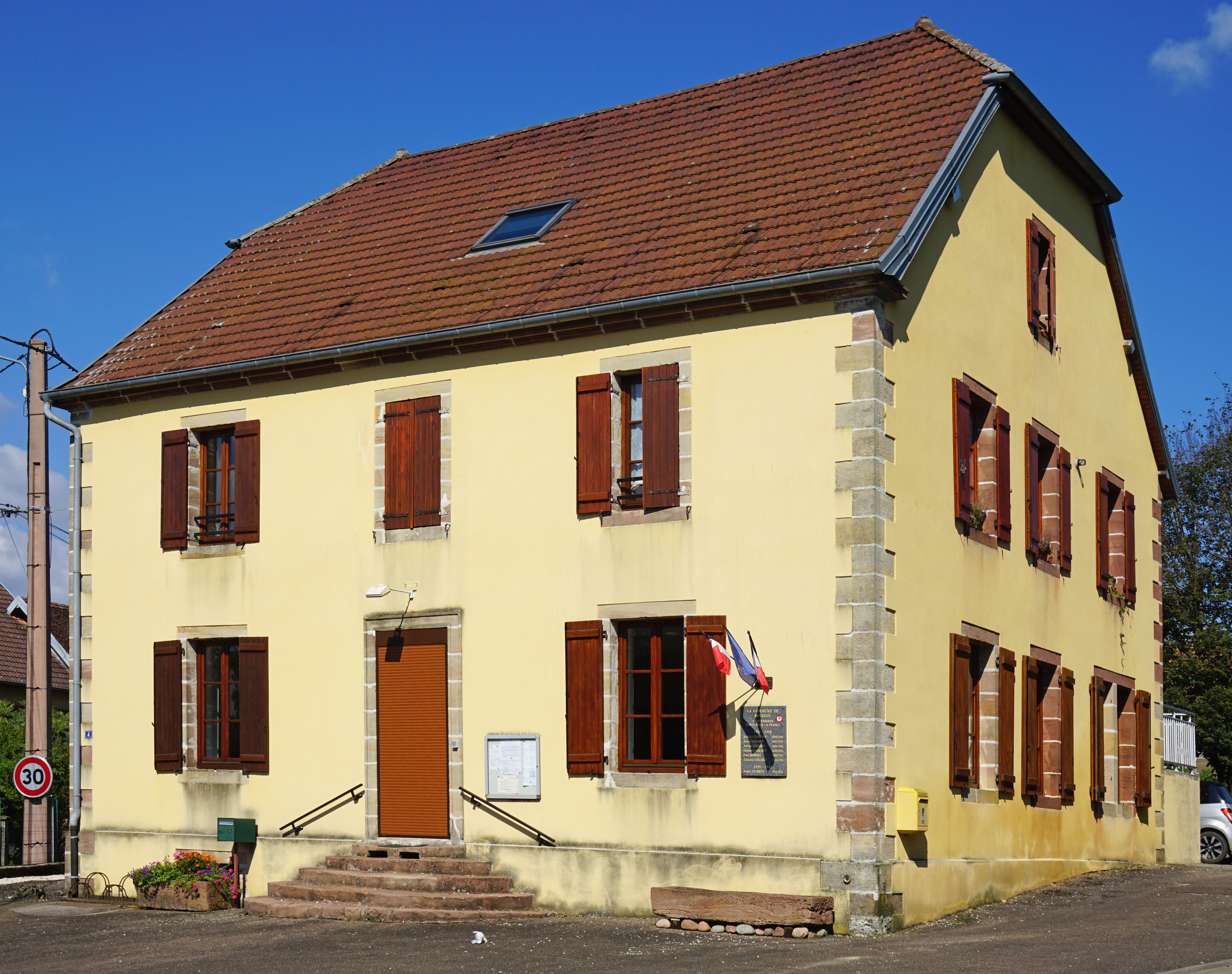
- The town hall in Beveuge
- Location of Beveuge
- Location within France Location within Bourgogne-Franche-Comté
- Coordinates: 47°33′33″N 6°29′01″E
- Country: France
- Region: Bourgogne-Franche-Comté
- Department: Haute-Saône
- Arrondissement: Lure
- Canton: Villersexel

Government
  - Mayor (2020–2026): Hélène Petitjean
- Area^{1}: 5.18 km^{2} (2.00 sq mi)
- Highest elevation: 300 m (980 ft)
- Lowest elevation: 265 m (869 ft)
- Population (2023): 87
  - Density: 17/km^{2} (43/sq mi)
- Time zone: UTC+01:00 (CET)
  - Summer (DST): UTC+02:00 (CEST)
- INSEE/Postal code: 70072 /70110
- ^{1} French Land Register data, which excludes lakes, ponds, glaciers > 1 km^{2} (0.386 sq mi or 247 acres) and river estuaries.

Beveuge (French pronunciation: [bəvøʒ]) is a commune in the Haute-Saône department in the region of Bourgogne-Franche-Comté in eastern France.

The river Rognon joins the Scey here.

== See also ==
- Communes of the Haute-Saône department
