= Fau (river) =

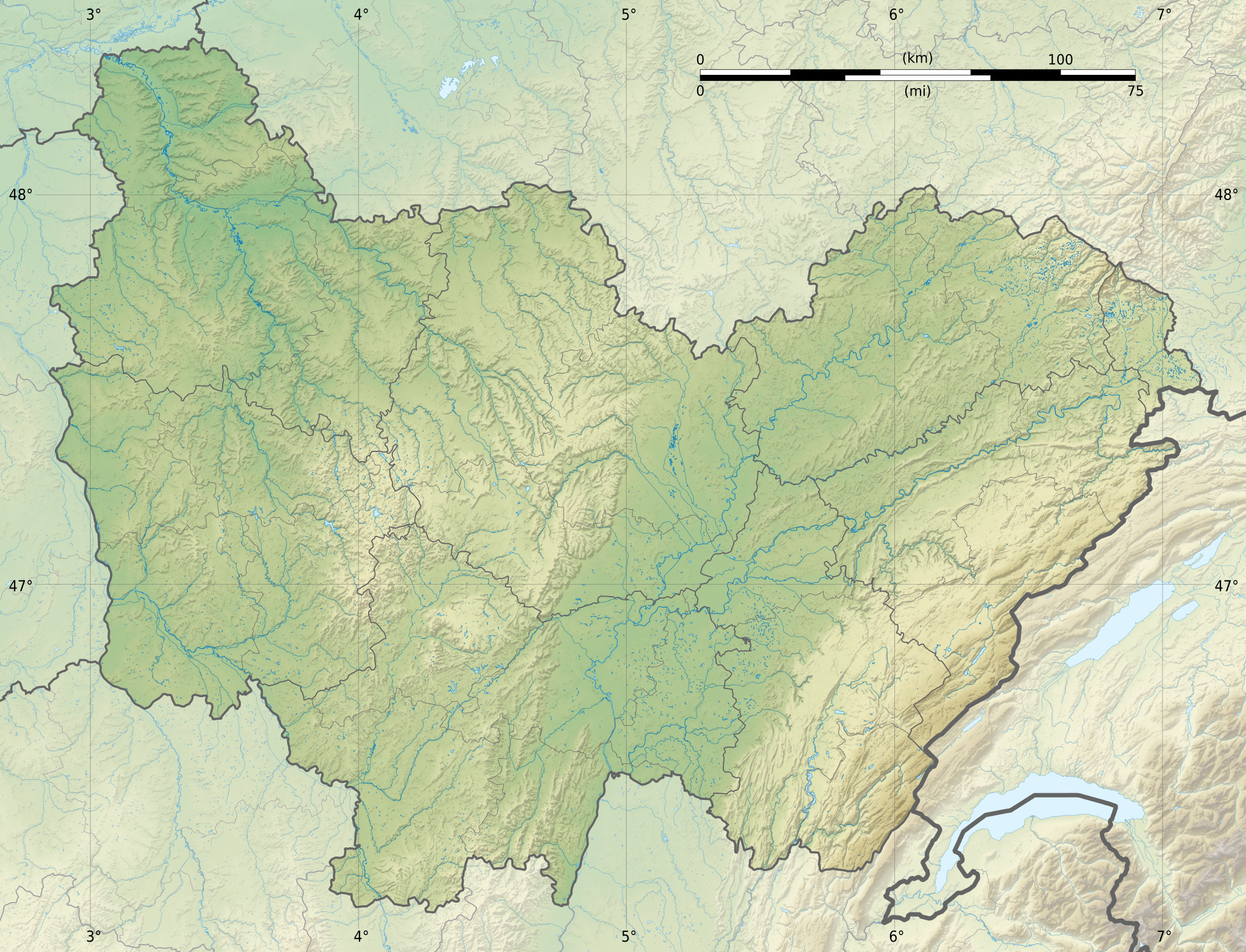
- Location within France Location within Bourgogne-Franche-Comté

Location
- Country: France

Physical characteristics
- Mouth: Rognon
  - coordinates: 47.6408°N 6.5718°E
- Length: 10.4 km (6.5 mi)

Basin features
- Progression: Rognon→ Scey→ Ognon→ Saône→ Rhône→ Mediterranean Sea

The Fau is a 10.4 km river in the Haute-Saône department in the Bourgogne-Franche-Comté region of eastern France. It rises in Étobon and flows generally west to join the Rognon in Moffans-et-Vacheresse.
