= Moffans-et-Vacheresse =

- Commune
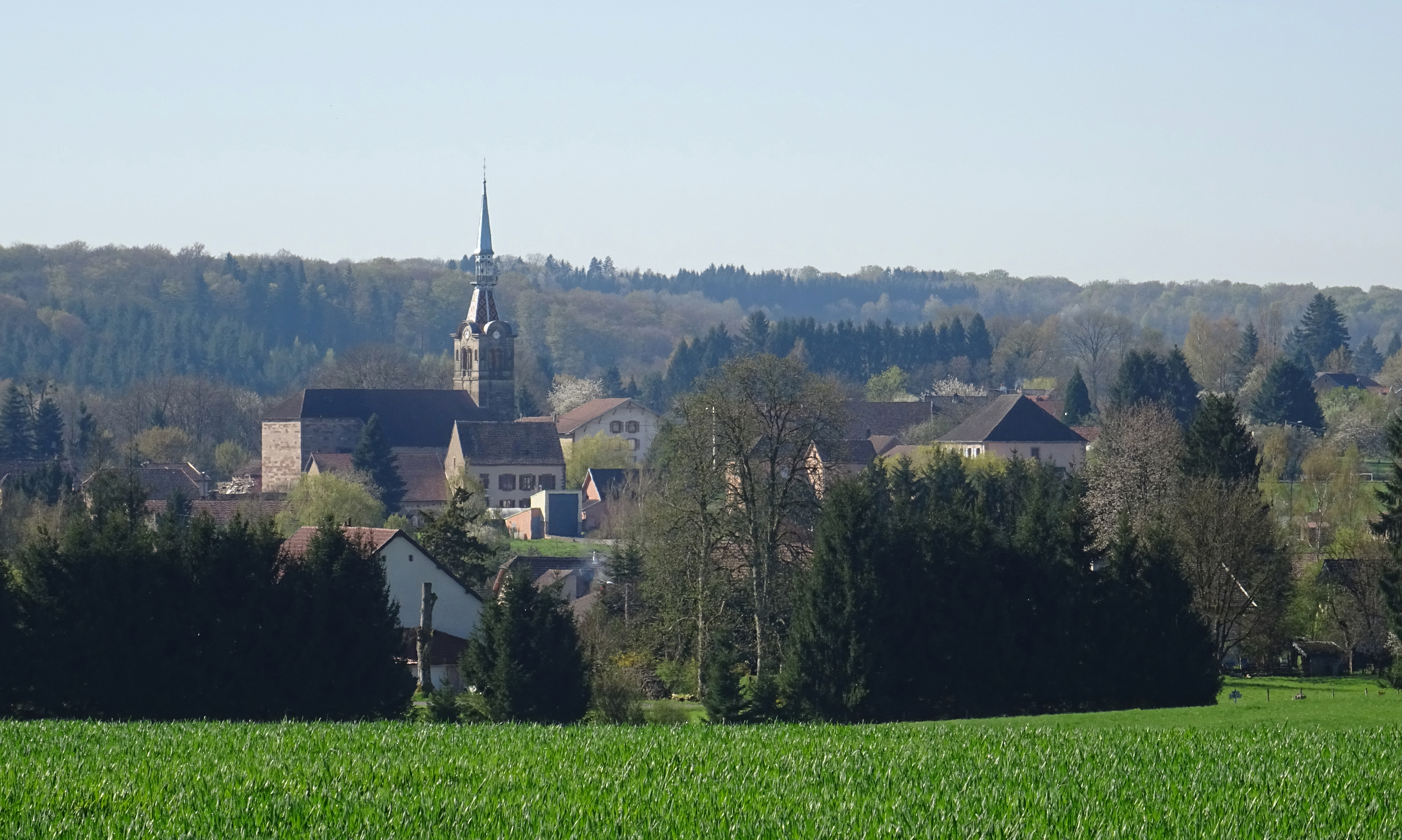
- A general view of Moffans-et-Vacheresse

- Coat of arms
- Location of Moffans-et-Vacheresse
- Location within France Location within Bourgogne-Franche-Comté
- Coordinates: 47°37′48″N 6°33′04″E
- Country: France
- Region: Bourgogne-Franche-Comté
- Department: Haute-Saône
- Arrondissement: Lure
- Canton: Lure-2

Government
  - Mayor (2020–2026): Pierre Thomas
- Area^{1}: 14.09 km^{2} (5.44 sq mi)
- Highest elevation: 269 m (883 ft)
- Lowest elevation: 280 m (920 ft)
- Population (2023): 609
  - Density: 43.2/km^{2} (112/sq mi)
- Time zone: UTC+01:00 (CET)
  - Summer (DST): UTC+02:00 (CEST)
- INSEE/Postal code: 70348 /70200
- ^{1} French Land Register data, which excludes lakes, ponds, glaciers > 1 km^{2} (0.386 sq mi or 247 acres) and river estuaries.

Moffans-et-Vacheresse (French pronunciation: [mɔfɑ̃ e vaʃʁɛs]) is a commune in the Haute-Saône department in the region of Bourgogne-Franche-Comté in eastern France.

The river Fau joins the Rognon here.

== See also ==
- Communes of the Haute-Saône department
