= FAU =

FAU or Fau may refer to:

== Education ==
- Florida Atlantic University, in Boca Raton, Florida, U.S.
- University of Erlangen–Nuremberg (German: Friedrich-Alexander-Universität Erlangen-Nürnberg), in Bavaria, Germany

== People ==
- Felix Anudike-Uzomah (born 2002), American football player
- André Fau (1896–1982), French visual artist and poet
- Fernand Fau (1858–1919), French illustrator and cartoonist
- Michel Fau (born 1964), French comedian

== Places ==
- Le Fau, France
- Fau (river), in Haute-Saône, France

== Politics ==
- Uruguayan Anarchist Federation (Spanish: Federación Anarquista Uruguaya)
- Free Workers' Union (German: Freie ArbeiterInnen-Union), a union in Germany
- Broad Front UNEN (Spanish: Frente Amplio Unen), a political coalition in Argentina

== Other uses ==
- FAU (gene), encoding 40S ribosomal protein S30
- Fau (letter), or digamma, an archaic letter of the Greek alphabet
- F. Arthur Uebel (FAU), German manufacturer of clarinets
- Florida Atlantic Owls, the athletic program of Florida Atlantic University
- Friends' Ambulance Unit, a British ambulance service
- Uruguayan Air Force (Spanish: Fuerza Aérea Uruguaya)
- Automobile Federation of Ukraine
- Faujasite, a zeolite material

== See also ==
- Big Fau, a fictional "Megadeus" robot in The Big O
