= Lyoffans =

- Commune
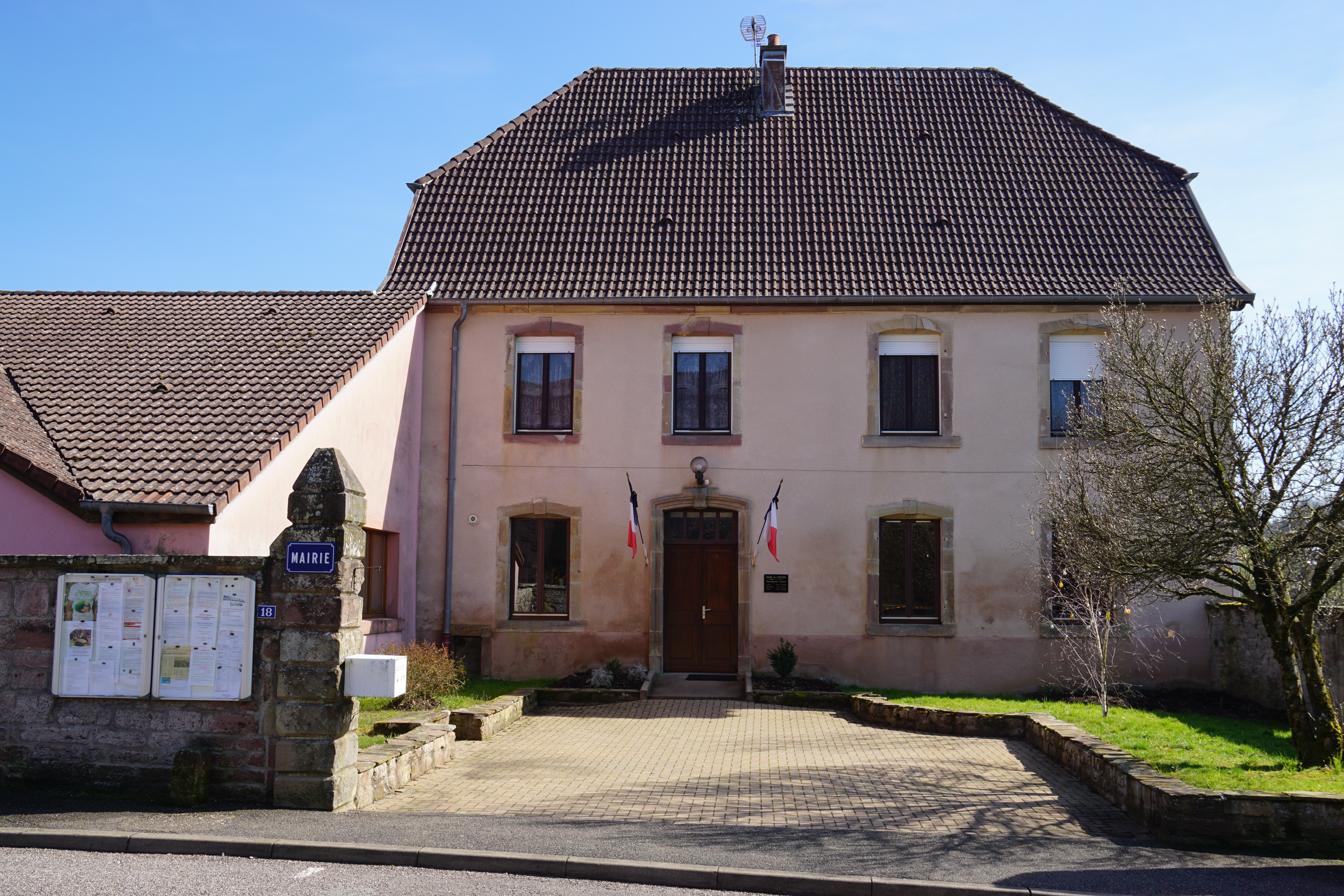
- The town hall in Lyoffans

- Coat of arms
- Location of Lyoffans
- Location within France Location within Bourgogne-Franche-Comté
- Coordinates: 47°38′55″N 6°34′55″E
- Country: France
- Region: Bourgogne-Franche-Comté
- Department: Haute-Saône
- Arrondissement: Lure
- Canton: Lure-2

Government
  - Mayor (2020–2026): Laurent Demonet
- Area^{1}: 4.49 km^{2} (1.73 sq mi)
- Highest elevation: 375 m (1,230 ft)
- Lowest elevation: 293 m (961 ft)
- Population (2023): 452
  - Density: 101/km^{2} (261/sq mi)
- Time zone: UTC+01:00 (CET)
  - Summer (DST): UTC+02:00 (CEST)
- INSEE/Postal code: 70313 /70200
- ^{1} French Land Register data, which excludes lakes, ponds, glaciers > 1 km^{2} (0.386 sq mi or 247 acres) and river estuaries.

Lyoffans (French pronunciation: [ljɔfɑ̃]) is a commune in the Haute-Saône department in the region of Bourgogne-Franche-Comté in eastern France.

The river Clairegoutte joins the Rognon here.

== See also ==
- Communes of the Haute-Saône department
