= Abdallah bin Alawi =

Abdallah bin Alawi was the Sultan (Shirazi) of and on Anjouan island (in the Comoros) from 1816 to 1832, and then again from 1833 to his death in 1836. He was succeeded first by Ali bin Salim, and finally by Saidi Alawi bin Abdallah.

Preceded by Alawi bin Husain	Sultan of Anjouan; 1816–1832	Succeeded by Ali bin Salim
Preceded by Ali bin Salim	Sultan of Anjouan; 1833–1836	Succeeded by Saidi Alawi bin Abdallah
