= Abderremane, Sultan of Mohéli =

Abderremane

King (Sultan) of Mohéli (Mwali)
- Reign: 1830–1842
- Predecessor: none
- Successor: Djoumbé Fatima
- Born: 1780
- Died: 1842 (aged 61–62); Fomboni
- Spouse: Ravao (–1847)
- Issue: from marriage: 1. Djoumbé Fatima (1836/37–1878); 2. Razaimanana; 3. Rahamina; 4. Randriaka; 5. Razafintsara; out of wedlock: 6. Djumbé Salama (1839–ca. 1858)
- House: Merina Dynasty
- Father: Price Rainimanetaka
- Mother: Princess Rabodomananimerina (Rabodomana)
- Religion: Islam

Abderremane (–1842), also known as Ramanetaka-Rivo, was king (sultan) of Mohéli in Comoros from 1830 until his death.

== Life ==
His parents were Merina Princes of Madagascar. His birth name was Prince Ramanetaka-Rivo. He was a Field-Marshall from Madagascar, and was brother-in-law to Radama I, King of Madagascar. Governor of Bombetoka and Mahajanga (1824-1828)

After he died in 1842, his daughter, Djoumbé Fatima, ascended to the throne. His widow, Ravao (daughter of Andriantsiahofa, of Imamo West), ruled as regent for a time and married his former adviser, General Ratsivandini, in 1843 at Jombe Fomboni.

== Bibliography ==
- Ibrahime, Mahmoud: Djoumbé Fatima: Une reine comorienne face aux visées coloniales de la marine française. Tarehi - Revue d'Histoire et d'Archéologie 2, 10–17, 2001.
- Grosdidier, Christophe: Djoumbe Fatima, reine de Mohéli, L'Harmattan, Paris, 2004. ISBN 978-2-7475-6953-8

Abderremane, Sultan of Mohéli Dynasty of Merina Born: ? Died: 1842
Regnal titles
Preceded by none	King (Sultan) of Mohéli (Mwali); 1830–1842	Succeeded by Djoumbé Fatima
