= Faouz Faidine Attoumane =

Comorian international footballer

Personal information
- Full name: Faouz Faidine Ali Attoumane
- Date of birth: 4 January 1994 (age 32)
- Place of birth: Fomboni, Comoros
- Height: 1.75 m (5 ft 9 in)
- Position: Midfielder

Team information
- Current team: FC Nouadhibou

Senior career*
Years	Team	Apps	(Gls)
2010–2020	Fomboni		
2020–	FC Nouadhibou		

International career^{‡}
2015–	Comoros	16	(0)
- * Club domestic league appearances and goals as of 13:30, 29 May 2022 (UTC) ‡ National team caps and goals as of 13:30, 29 May 2022 (UTC)

Faouz Faidine Ali Attoumane (born 4 January 1994) is a Comorian international footballer who plays for Fomboni, as a midfielder.

== Career ==
Born in Fomboni, Attoumane has played for Fomboni and FC Nouadhibou.

He made his international debut for Comoros in 2015.
