= Alawi bin Husain =

Sultan of Anjouan island (died 1816)

Alawi bin Husain (died 1816) was the Sultan of and on Anjouan island (in the Comoros Islands) from 1796 to his death in 1816.

He was succeeded by his son Abdallah bin Alawi.

Preceded by Abdallah I	Sultan of Anjouan; 1796–1816	Succeeded by Abdallah II
