= Halima IV =

Halima IV, also called Alimah IV (fl. 1792), was the sovereign Sultana regnant of the Anjouan sultanate at Nzwani in the Comoro Islands from 1788 until 1792.

Halima was born to prince Mohamed (d. 1787), the son and designated heir of Sultan Abdallah I. Her father died when her grandfather was absent during his pilgrimage to Mecca. Upon his return, he was saddened by the news of his son's death, and gave his granddaughter princess Halimah an important position.

In 1788, Abdallah I abdicated in favor of his granddaughter, who became known as Halimah IV. Anjouan was an island involved in the Indian Ocean slave trade with Arabs and Europeans. While the island was Muslim, Islam was mildly practiced, women did not live secluded in harems, and three women had ruled before. She ruled the island for four years.

In 1792, her grandfather became sultan again.

Preceded by Abdallah I	Sultan of Anjouan; 1788–1792	Succeeded by Abdallah I
