= Salimo Velonjara =

Comorian footballer

Personal information
- Date of birth: 10 November 1988 (age 37)
- Place of birth: Antsiranana, Madagascar
- Height: 1.78 m (5 ft 10 in)
- Position: Goalkeeper

Team information
- Current team: Fomboni

Senior career*
Years	Team	Apps	(Gls)
2015–	Fomboni		

International career^{‡}
2015–	Comoros	12	(0)
- * Club domestic league appearances and goals as of 14:47, 15 October 2018 (UTC) ‡ National team caps and goals as of 22:53, 26 July 2023 (UTC)

Salimo Velonjara (born 11 October 1988) is a Comorian international footballer who plays for Fomboni, as a goalkeeper.

== Career ==
Born in Antsiranana, Madagascar, he has played club football for Fomboni.

He made his international debut for Comoros in 2015.
