= Rognon (Scey) =

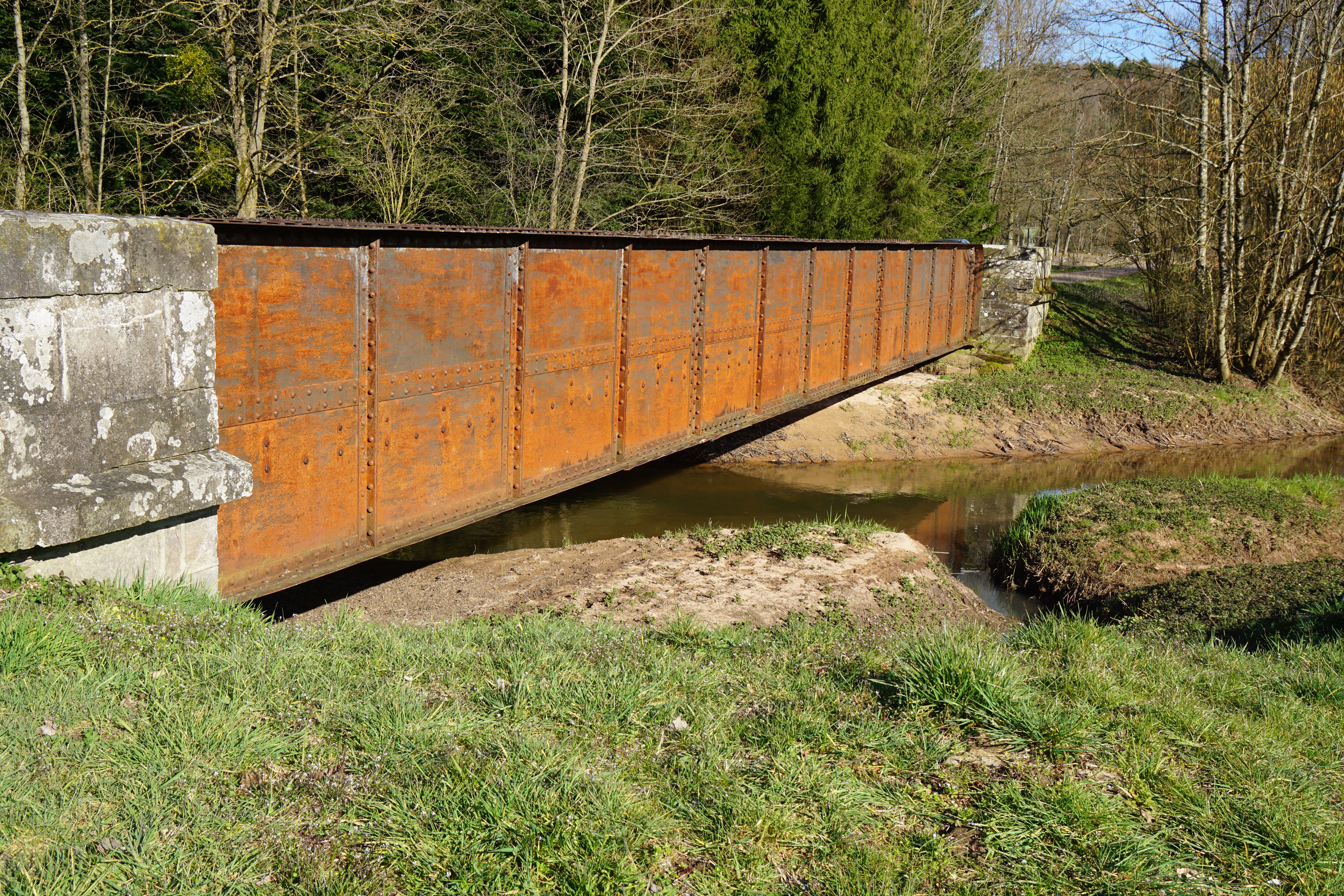

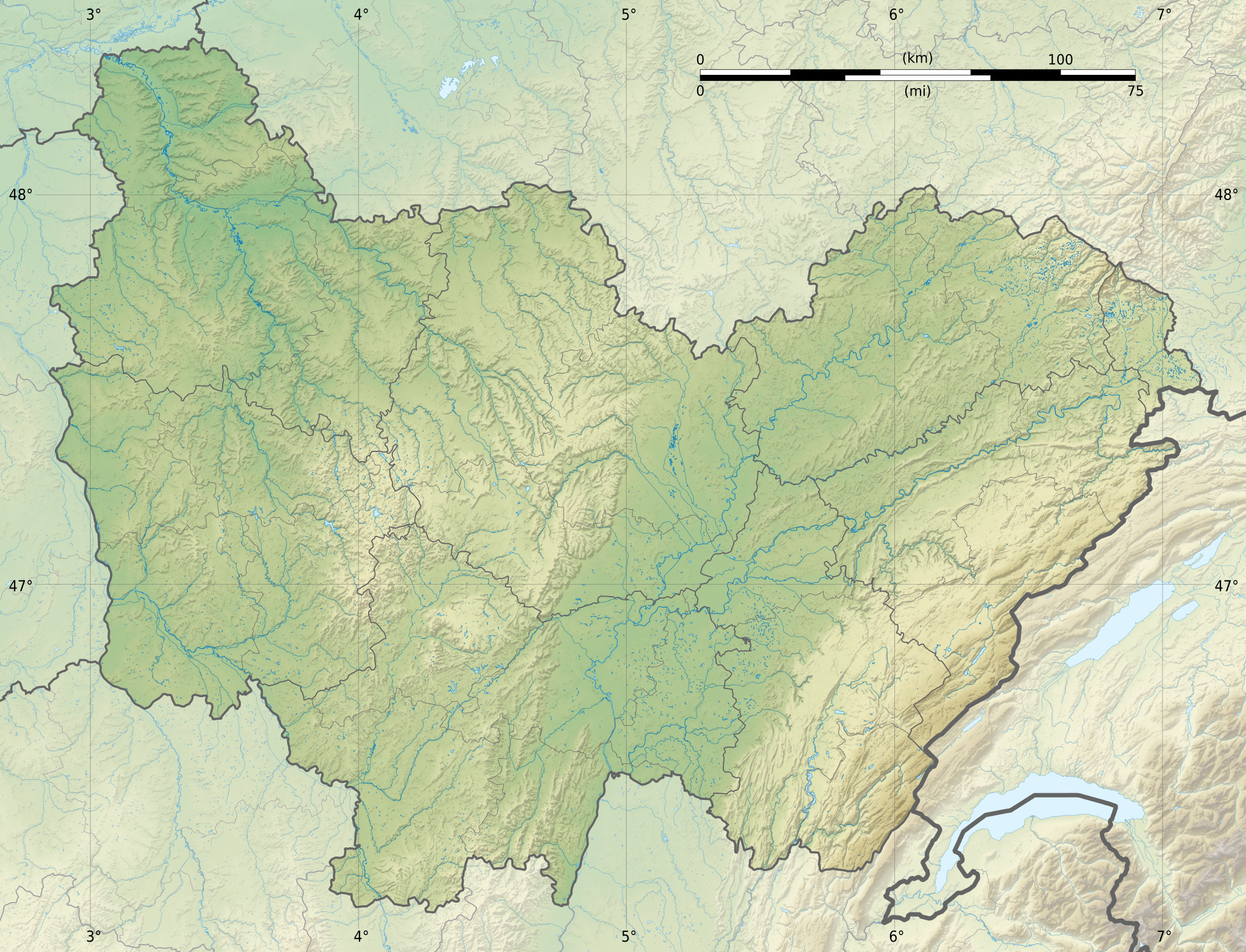
- Location within France Location within Bourgogne-Franche-Comté

Location
- Country: France

Physical characteristics
- Mouth: Scey
  - coordinates: 47.5694°N 6.4958°E
- Length: 18.8 km (11.7 mi)

Basin features
- Progression: Scey→ Ognon→ Saône→ Rhône→ Mediterranean Sea

The Rognon (French pronunciation: [ʁɔɲɔ̃]) is an 18.8 km long river in Haute-Saône department, eastern France. It rises in Magny-Danigon and flows generally southwest to join the Scey in Beveuge. Its tributaries include the Clairegoutte and the Fau.
