= Champagney, Jura =

Commune in Bourgogne-Franche-Comté, France

Champagney
- Commune
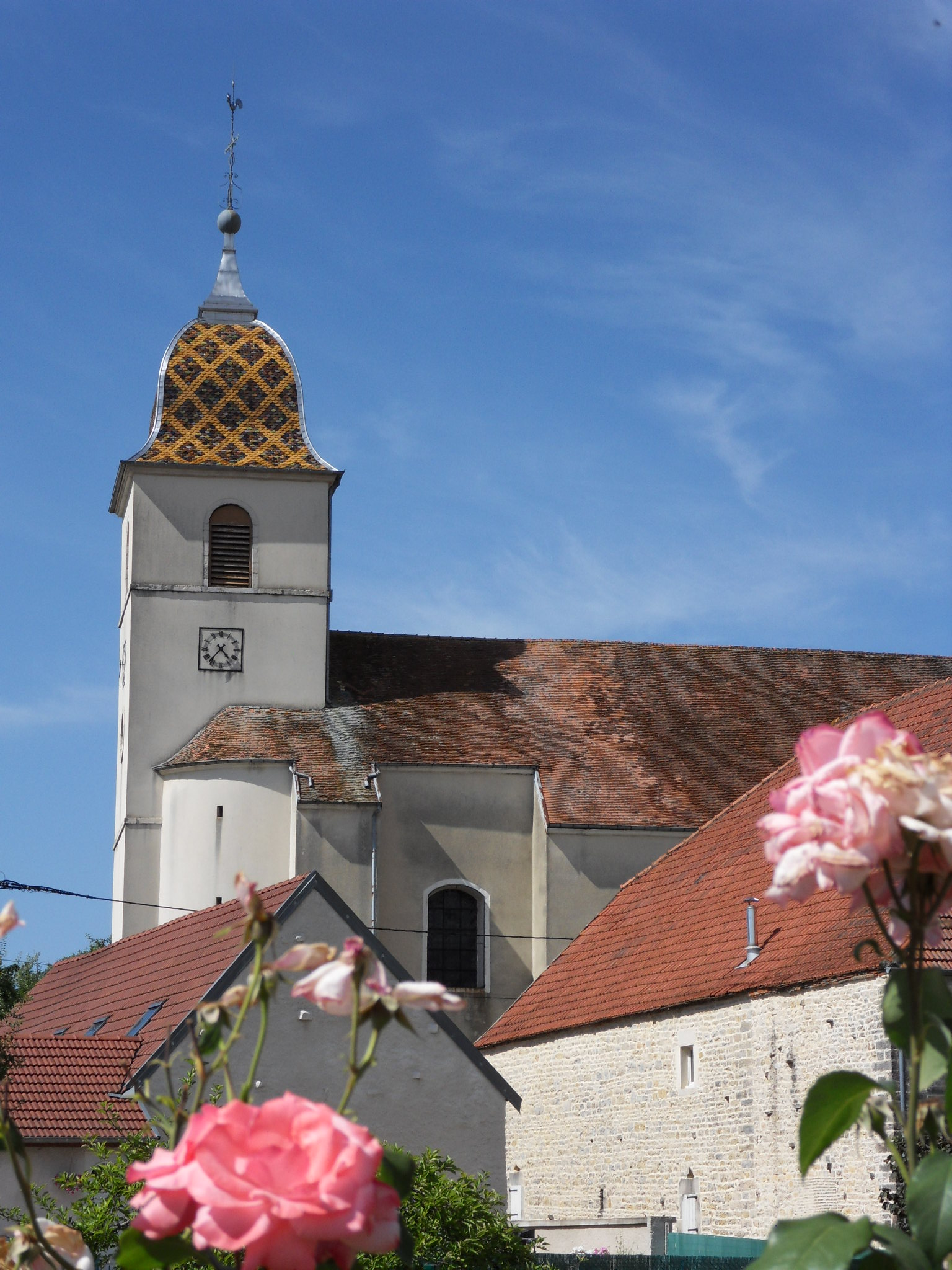
- The church in Champagney

- Coat of arms
- Location of Champagney
- Location within France Location within Bourgogne-Franche-Comté
- Coordinates: 47°15′39″N 5°30′57″E
- Country: France
- Region: Bourgogne-Franche-Comté
- Department: Jura
- Arrondissement: Dole
- Canton: Authume
- Intercommunality: CA Grand Dole

Government
  - Mayor (2020–2026): Pierre Verne
- Area^{1}: 15.58 km^{2} (6.02 sq mi)
- Highest elevation: 239 m (784 ft)
- Lowest elevation: 192 m (630 ft)
- Population (2023): 473
  - Density: 30.4/km^{2} (78.6/sq mi)
- Time zone: UTC+01:00 (CET)
  - Summer (DST): UTC+02:00 (CEST)
- INSEE/Postal code: 39096 /39290
- ^{1} French Land Register data, which excludes lakes, ponds, glaciers > 1 km^{2} (0.386 sq mi or 247 acres) and river estuaries.

Champagney (French pronunciation: [ʃɑ̃paɲɛ]) is a commune in the Jura department in Bourgogne-Franche-Comté in eastern France.

== Population ==
Historical population
Year	Pop.	±% p.a.
1968	240	—
1975	220	−1.24%
1982	205	−1.00%
1990	203	−0.12%
1999	216	+0.69%
2007	325	+5.24%
2012	444	+6.44%
2017	480	+1.57%
2023	473	−0.24%
Source: INSEE

== See also ==
- Communes of the Jura department
