= Cléry, Côte-d'Or =

Cléry
- Commune
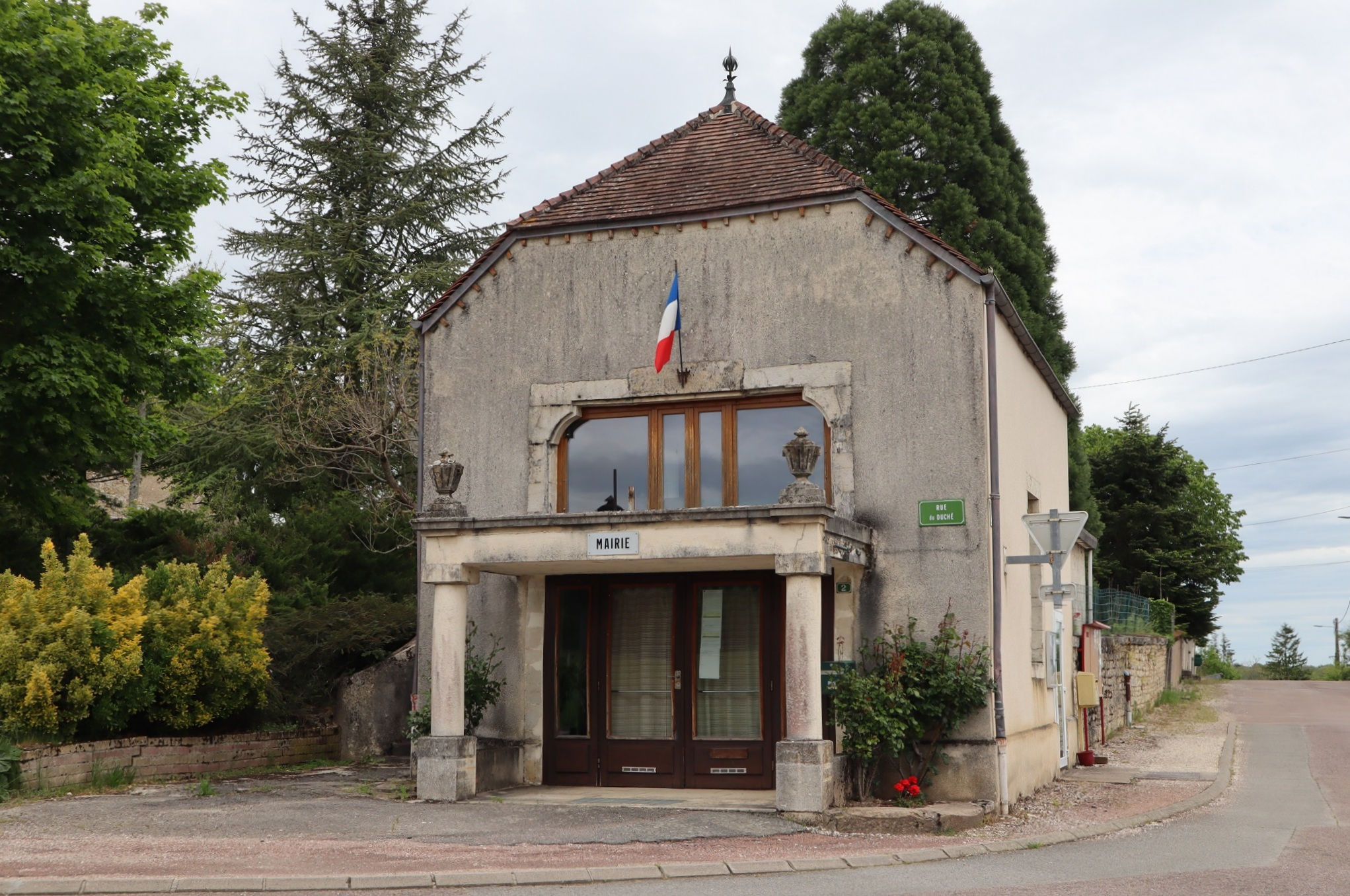
- Town hall

- Coat of arms
- Location of Cléry
- Location within France Location within Bourgogne-Franche-Comté
- Coordinates: 47°17′21″N 5°29′45″E
- Country: France
- Region: Bourgogne-Franche-Comté
- Department: Côte-d'Or
- Arrondissement: Dijon
- Canton: Auxonne

Government
  - Mayor (2020–2026): Noël Veuriot
- Area^{1}: 3.37 km^{2} (1.30 sq mi)
- Elevation: 207 m (679 ft)
- Highest elevation: 208 m (682 ft)
- Lowest elevation: 187 m (614 ft)
- Population (2023): 159
  - Density: 47.2/km^{2} (122/sq mi)
- Time zone: UTC+01:00 (CET)
  - Summer (DST): UTC+02:00 (CEST)
- INSEE/Postal code: 21180 /21270
- ^{1} French Land Register data, which excludes lakes, ponds, glaciers > 1 km^{2} (0.386 sq mi or 247 acres) and river estuaries.

Cléry (French pronunciation: [kleʁi]) is a commune in the Côte-d'Or department in eastern France.

== Population ==
Historical population
Year	Pop.	±% p.a.
1968	118	—
1975	83	−4.90%
1982	139	+7.64%
1990	117	−2.13%
1999	136	+1.69%
2007	129	−0.66%
2012	124	−0.79%
2017	142	+2.75%
2023	159	+1.90%
Source: INSEE

== See also ==
- Communes of the Côte-d'Or department
