= List of sultans in the Comoro Islands =

Overview of Comorian sultans

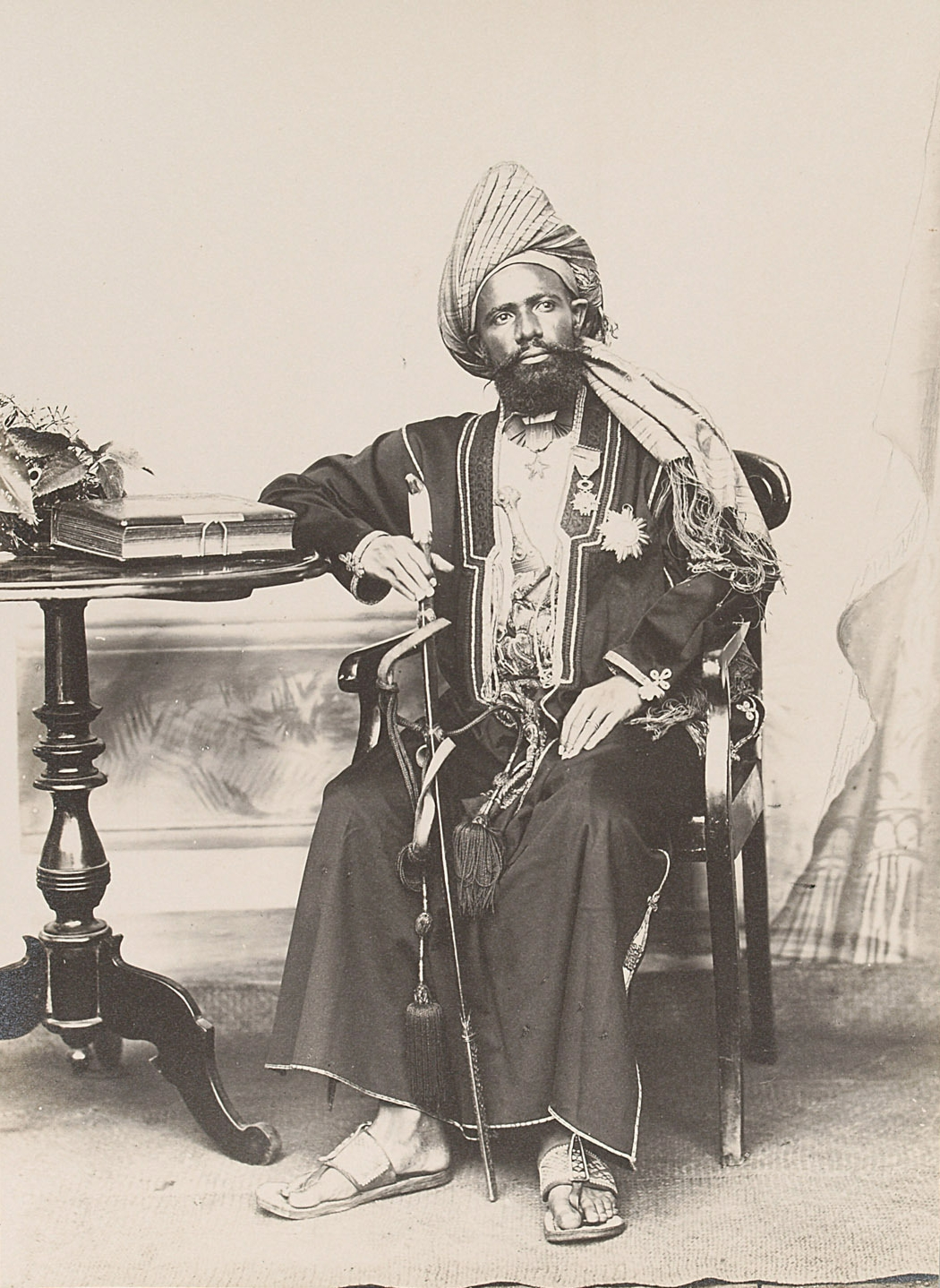
Sultan Said Ali bin Said Omar of Grande Comore (1897)

Several sultanates in the Comoro Islands, an archipelago in the Indian Ocean, were founded after the introduction of Islam into the area in the 15th century. Other titles could also be fani, mfaume and ntibe. Unlike sultans in many other Arab nations, these sultans had little real power. At one time alone on the island of Ndzuwani or Nzwani (today Anjouan), 40 fanis and other chiefs shared power of the island; Ngazidja (today Grand Comore) was at many times divided into 11 sultanates. This article addresses the major sultanates.

The term Shirazis (derived from the former Persian capital Shiraz) is a reference to Iranian roots, in some dynasties. The sultans of Hamamvu (Washirazi sultans) are a surviving dynasty that claims origins in Persia and carries an extant connection to the Washirazi people of the East African Coast.

The following five cities have been collectively inscribed as a UNESCO World Heritage Site in 2026:

- Ntsudjini
- Iconi
- Itsandra
- Moroni
- Mutsamudu

== Sultans of Ndzuwani (Anjouan) ==
#	Name	Reign Start	Reign End	Notes
1	Muhammad I	c. 1500	c. 1506	Founder
2	Hassan	c. 1506	?	-
3	Muhammad II	?	?	–
4	Msindra	?	?	
5	Alimah I	?	c. 1590	First female sultan of Anjouan. Otherwise known as Halima.
6	Sayid Alawi	c. 1590	c. 1605	Regent
7	Hussein	c. 1605	c. 1610	–
8	Sayid Idarus	c. 1610	c. 1619	Regent
9	Sayid Abu Bakr	c. 1619	c. 1632	Regent
10	Alimah II	c. 1632	c. 1676	Second female sultan of Anjouan. Also known as Halima II.
11	Alimah III	c. 1676	c. 1711	Third female sultan of Anjouan. Also known as Halima III.
12	Sheikh Salim	c. 1711	1741	–
13	Sheikh Ahmad	1741	1782	Also known as Said Ahmad.
14	Abdallah I	1782	1788	–
15	Alimah IV	1788	1792	Fourth female sultan of Anjouan. Also known as Halimah IV.
–	Abdallah I	1792	1796	Second reign
16	Alawi I	1796	1816	Also known as Mwinye Fani
17	Abdallah II bin Alawi	1816	1832	–
18	Ali	1832	1833	Also known as Ali bin Salim
–	Abdallah II bin Alawi	1833	1836	Second reign
19	Alawi II	1836	1837	Also known as Saidi Alawi bin Abdallah
20	Salim I	1837	1852	Also known as Salim bin Alawi
21	Abdallah III	1852	February 1891	Also known as Saidi Abdallah bin Salim. The Sultanate of Anjouan became part of the Mayotte Protectorate in 1866.
22	Salim II	February 1891	2 April 1891	Also known as Salim bin Abdallah
23	Said Omar	2 April 1891	14 April 1892	Also known as Saidi Omar bin Said Hasan
24	Said Ali	14 April 1892	25 July 1912	Also known as Said Ali bin Said Omar

== Sultans of Mayotte ==
Mayotte was conquered by the Sultanate of Anjouan in 1835, after which it was ruled by Anjouani qadis (governors) until 1841 when it became a protectorate under the French.

#	Name	Reign Start	Reign End	Notes
1	Hassan I	c. 1515	c. 1530	
2	Muhammad	c. 1530	c. 1550	
3	Isa	c. 1550	c. 1590	
4	Amina	c. 1590	c. 1596	Queen Regent
5	Bwana Fuma ibn Ali	c. 1596	c. 1620	Regent
6	Ali I	c. 1620	c. 1640	
7	Umar	c. 1640	c. 1680	
8	Ali II	c. 1680	c. 1700	
9	Aisa	c. 1700	c. 1714	Queen Regent
10	Monavo Fani	c. 1714	c. 1720	Queen Regent
11	Abu Bakr	c. 1720	1727	
12	Salim I	1727	1752	
13	Bwana Kombo I	1752	1790	
14	Salim II	1790	1807	
15	Salih	1807	1817	
19	Ahmad	1817	1829	
20	Bwana Kombo II	1829	1832	
21	Andrianametaka	1832	19 November 1835	
–	Umar	19 November 1835	c. 1838	Anjouan Qadi
–	Adriantsuli	c. 1838	25 March 1841	Anjouan Qadi

== Sultans on Ngazidja (Grande Comore) ==
=== Sultans of Bambao ===
Styled mfalme (plural wafalme).

No.	Name	Notes
Inya Mwatsoa Pirusa dynasty
1	Ngoma Mrahafu	
2	Mwasi Pirusa	
3	Fum Mbavu Inkwaba	
4	Mwenye Mji wa Mwenye Mambo	
5	Inye wa Mantsi	
6	Mwenye Mji wa Mwanze	
7	Tambavu mna Muhame wa Saidi	
8	Tambavu Inkwaba	
Inya Fey wa Mbaya dynasty
9	Fum Nau wa Kori Dozi	He was the first ruler of Bamboa to be given the title (Sultan) Tibe, i.e. Paramount ruler of the island.
Inya Mwatsoa Pirusa dynasty (Restored)
10	Mwenye Mji wa Mvunza Panga	
11	Mla Nau	Second ruler with the hegemonic title Sultan tibe.
12	Fozi Wa	
13	Suja Oma Inkwaba	
14	Nyau wa Faume	Only female sultan of Bambao.
15	Bamba Oma wa Ju Mamba	First reign.
16	Ahmed bin Shekhe Ngome	First reign. The fourth ruler to styled Sultan tibe. Born in c. 1793 and died in 1875.
*	Bamba Oma wa Ju Mamba	Second reign.
*	Ahmed bin Shekhe Ngome	Second reign.
17	Saidi Bakari	
*	Ahmed bin Shekhe Ngome	Third reign.
18	Mwenye Mambo	
19	Ju Mamba	
20	Mohamed bin Ahmed	First reign.
*	Ahmed bin Shekhe Ngome	Fourth reign. Also known as tibe X.
21	Abdallah bin Saidi Hamza	First reign.
*	Mohamed bin Ahmed	Second reign.
22	Mwenye Mji	First reign.
*	Abdallah bin Saidi Hamza	Second reign.
23	Saidi Bakari bin Ahmed	First reign.
*	Mwenye Mji	Second reign.
*	Abdallah bin Saidi Hamza	Third reign.
*	Saidi Bakari bin Ahmed	Second reign.
24	Saidi Ali bin Saidi Omar	Reigned c. 1875–1886. Also known as tibe XV. Born in c. 1856 and died in 1916.

=== Sultans of Itsandra ===
Styled "Mfaume" (in Shingazidja) or Mfalme (in Kiswahili). All rulers were part of the Inya Fey wa Mbaya dynasty. Reign dates are unknown.

No.	Name	Notes
1	Fey Owa Mbaya	
2	Fey Mwenza	
3	Fey Jumbe	
4	Ju Mwamba Pirusa	
5	Zombe Ilingo	
6	Nguzo wa Inehili	
7	Tibe wa Kanzu	
8	Mkongo	
9	Mna Musa Hibu	
10	Muhammadi Saidi	
11	Mvunza Panga	
12	Fey Beja wa Wabeja	Only female sultan of Itsandra.
13	Fum Nau wa Kori Dozi	Sultan of both Bambao and Itsandra. Also known as tibe I.
14	Fey Fumu	First reign. Also known as tibe III.
15	Bwana Fumu	First reign. Also known as tibe V.
*	Fey Fumu	Second reign. Also known as tibe VI.
*	Bwana Fumu	Second reign. Also known as tibe VII.
*	Fey Fumu	Third reign. Also known as tibe VIII.
16	Fum Mbavu	Also known as tibe IX.
17	Musa Fumu wa Fey Fumu	First reign. Also known as tibe XI.
18	Tibe Bamba	First reign. Also known as tibe XII.
*	Musa Fumu wa Fey Fumu	Second reign. Also known as tibe XIII.
*	Tibe Bamba	Second reign. Also known as tibe XIV.
*	Musa Fumu wa Fey Fumu	Third reign.
*	Tibe Bamba	Third reign.
*	Musa Fumu wa Fey Fumu	Fourth reign. Died in 1883.
*	Tibe Bamba	Fourth reign.
19	Kalega	

=== Sultans of Mitsamihuli ===
Styled "Mfaume/Mfalme". All rulers were part of the Inya Mwatsoa Pirusa dynasty. Reign dates are unknown.

No.	Name	Notes
1	Mahame Msahi	
2	Fozi wa Mahame	
3	Mbantsi	
4	Ju Mambu Madi wa Musa Fumu	
5	Jumbe Fumu Mfaume wa Domba	Co-rulers. First reign of Jumbe Fumu Mfaume wa Domba.
6	Kori Dazi	Co-rulers. First reign of Jumbe Fumu Mfaume wa Domba.
*	Jumbe Fumu Mfaume wa Domba	Co-rulers. Second reign of Jumbe Fumu Mfaume wa Domba.
7	Tambavu wa Jumbe Fumu	Co-rulers. Second reign of Jumbe Fumu Mfaume wa Domba.
8	Fozi Wa	
9	Suja Fumu Mbamba	Co-rulers.
10	Mba Fumu wa Jumbe Fumu	Co-rulers.
11	Msa Fumu wa Tambwe	Co-rulers.
12	Jumbe Fumu wa Jumbe Mfumu	Co-rulers.
13	Mbandhi wa Bwana Haji	
14	Abdallah bin Ahmed	Co-rulers.
15	Mbandhi wa Bwana Haji	Co-rulers.
16	Bwana Fumu	Reign ended around 1886.

=== Sultans of Washili ===
Styled "Mfaume/Mfalme". Rulers were part of the Inya Maoni Yambao and Inya Fu Wemba dynasties.

#	Name	Notes
1	Mohama Mdume wa Beja	
2	Fey Zinda wa Mawana	
3	Fey Zinda wa Makasara	
4	Tambwe Msa Fumu	Co-rulers.
5	Tambwe wa Habadi	Co-rulers.
6	Jumbe Fumu wa Mlala Bwani	
7	Tambwe No Fumu wa Mla Nau	Born in 1735 and died in 1815. He reigned around 1760.
8	Ju Mwamba Mwenye Majini	
9	Mba Fumu wa Suja Fumu Bamba	Co-rulers.
10	Shekhe Salim	Co-rulers.
11	Mavunzanga	
12	Tibe Mle	
13	Abudu	

=== Sultans of Bajini ===
Styled "Mfaume/Mfalme"

#	Name	Reign	Notes
1	Mwenya Bamba I	?	
2	Bamba Jumbe	?	
3	Tambe Mbafu wa Fum Nau	?	
4	Ju Mamba Oma wa Mla Nau	?	Co-rulers.
5	Mwambatsi	?	Co-rulers.
6	Mwenye Bamba II	?	
7	Bamba Oma	?	Co-rulers.
8	Suja Oma wa Tambwe	?	Co-rulers.
9	Shekani	?	Co-rulers.
10	Fuma Oma	?	Co-rulers.
11	Oma wa Dari	?–1884	Co-rulers.
12	Ja Mhaba	?	First female sultan of Bajini.
13	Hashimu bin Ahmed	?	First reign.
14	Hadija bint Ahmed	?	Second female sultan of Bajini.
*	Hashimu bin Ahmed	?–1886	Second reign.
–	Interregnum	1886–1889	
*	Hashimu bin Ahmed	1889	Third reign.

=== Sultans of Hambuu ===
Styled "Mfaume/Mfalme". All rulers were part of the Inya Mba Mro dynasty. Reign dates are unknown.

#	Name	Notes
1	Beja Mbuyuni	
2	Nau wa Migira	
3	Nau wa Moro	
4	Fumu Mau	
5	Yasi Azu	
6	Demani Mtango	
7	Fumu Jimba wa Idimani	
8	Madi Jimbwa wa Tangwe	Co-rulers.
9	Dari wa Mla Nau	Co-rulers.
10	Jumbe Fumu wa Suja Oma Inkwaba	
11	Suja Oma wa Tambwe	
12	Mrunda Mijo	Co-rulers.
13	Fey Mwando wa Tambwe	Co-rulers.
14	Bamba Oma wa Ju Mamba	
15	Tambwe wa Hinye	
16	Abudu bin Mohamed bin Sultani	Co-rulers.
17	Bamba Oma wa Oma	Co-rulers.

=== Sultans of Hamahame ===
Styled "Mfaume/Mfalme". Subordinated to Itsandra. Reign dates unknown.

#	Name
1	Nye Hila
2	Haji wa No Fumu
3	Suja Oma Mshinda Kodo
4	Jumbe Fumu Madi
5	Bwana Haji Musa
6	Simai
7	Dari Oma
8	Fumu Oma wa Nasiri
9	Suja Oma wa Fumu
10	Mba Fumu wa Bwana Haji
11	Suja Oma Bwana

=== Sultans of Mbwankuu ===
The sultan was also styled Mfaume/Mfalme; the only known incumbent (no dates) was: Bwana Fumu.

=== Sultans of Mbude ===
Sultans (also styled Mfaume/Mfalme). All rulers were part of the Inya Mwatsoa Udhiwa dynasty. Reign dates are unknown.

Mbude was subordinated to Itsandra from c. 1860 to 1872 and again from 1873 to 1880. It was subordinated to Bambao briefly from 1872 to 1873 and then again from 1880 to 1892.

#	Name
1	Msa Mwinza
2	Bamba
3	Lwali
4	Jumbe Fumu wa Tambwe
5	Dari Mbamba
6	Mwandhi Oma wa Jumbe Fumu
7	Bamba Oma wa Suja Funu
8	Jumbe Fumu Mna Mango
9	Bamba wa Madi Jimba
10	Jumbe Fumu wa Sinai

=== Sultans of Domba ===
The sultan was also styled Mfaume/Mfalme; the only known incumbent (no dates) was: Febeja Mambwe.

== Sultans of Mwali (Mohéli) ==
#	Name	Picture	Reign	Birth–Death	Notes
1	Abderremane I (Ramanetaka-Rivo)		1830–1842	?–1842	Son of Merina princes of Madagascar.; Brother-in-law to Radama I.; Ran away from Madagascar after the death of Radama I.; Founded the Sultanate of Mohéli in 1830, which had previously been part of the Ndzuwani sultanate.
2	Djoumbé Fatima bint Abderremane		1842–September 1865	c. 1836–1878 (age 41)	First female sultan of Mohéli.; Daughter of Abderremane.; Her mother, Ravao, ruled as regent from 1842 to 1847.; Known as Raketaka Jombe Sudy before 1851.; Known as Jumbe Fatima bint Abderremane from 1851 onwards.; First reign.
3	Mohamed bin Saidi Hamadi Makadara		September 1865–1874	c. 1859–1874 (age 15)	Son of Djoumbé Fatima.; His mother ruled as regent from September 1865 to 1868, and again from January 1871 to 1874.; Joseph-François Lambert ruled as regent from 1868 to January 1871.
*	Djoumbé Fatima bint Abderremane		1874–1878	c. 1836–1878 (age 41)	Second reign.
4	Abderremane II bin Saidi Hamadi Makadara		1878–1885	c. 1860–1885 (age 15)	Son of Djoumbé Fatima.
5	Mohammed Shekhe		1885–1886	Born c. 1830	
6	Marjani bin Abudu Shekhe		1886–1888	Born c. 1851	Mohéli was a French Protectorate from 1886 to 1889.
7	Salima Machamba bint Saidi Hamadi Makadara		1888–1909	1874–1964 (age 89)	Second female sultan of Mohéli.; Daughter of Djoumbé Fatima.; Never took office.; Three regents ruled from 1888 to 1889: Fadeli bin Othman, Balia Juma (female regent) and Abudu Tsivandini.; Mahmudu bin Mohamed Makadara ruled as regent from 1889 to 1897. He was a son of Djoumbé Fatima and half-brother of Salima Machamba. He resigned in 1897 and died a year later.; Last Sultan before Mohéli became a colony of France in 1909.; Moheli was governed by French residents in Anjouan until 1912, afterwards being annexed by France.

== See also ==
- List of rulers of the Comoros
- List of Sunni dynasties

== Sources and external links ==
- Almanach de Bruxelles (now a paying site)
- World Statesmen – Comoros
