= Scey =

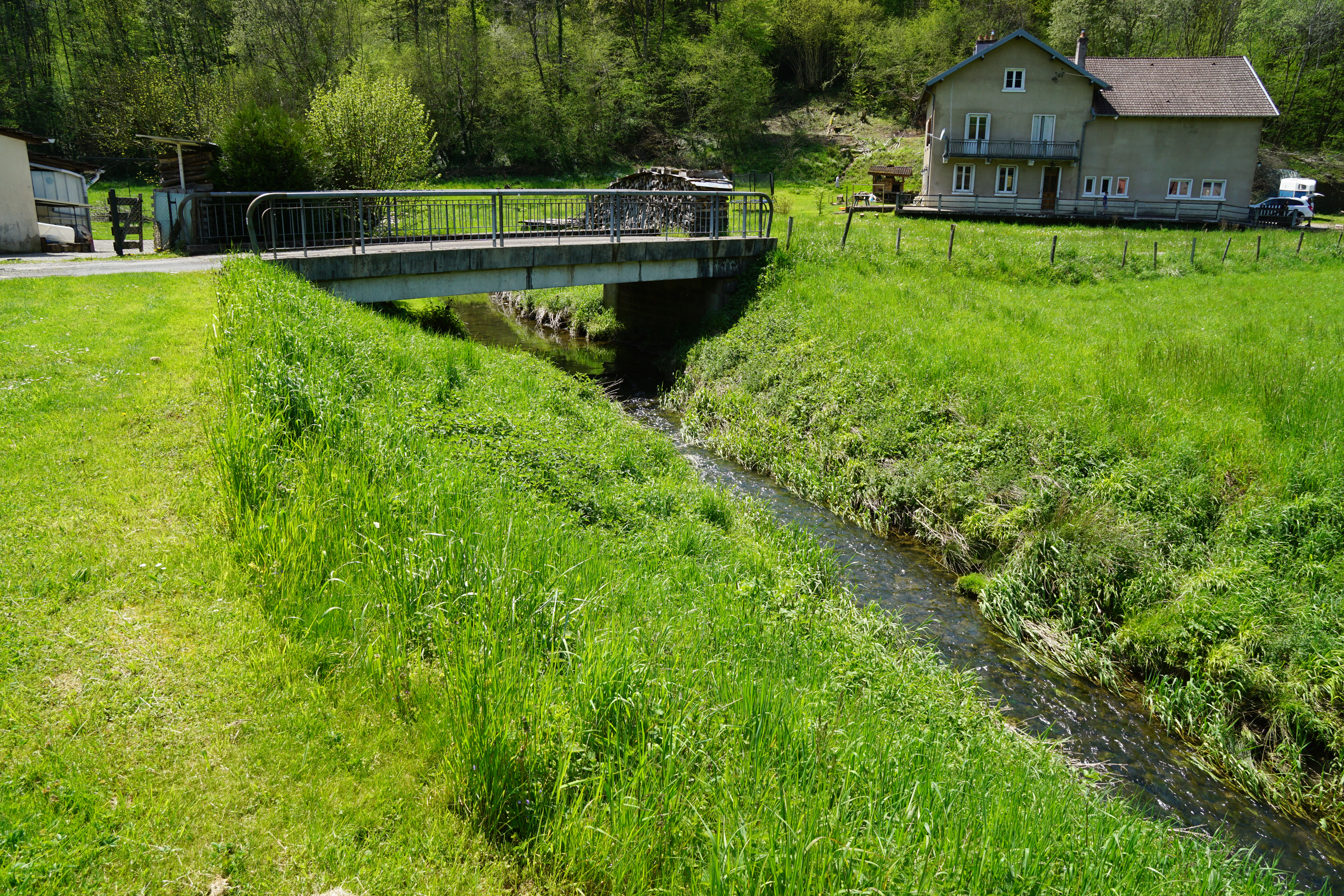

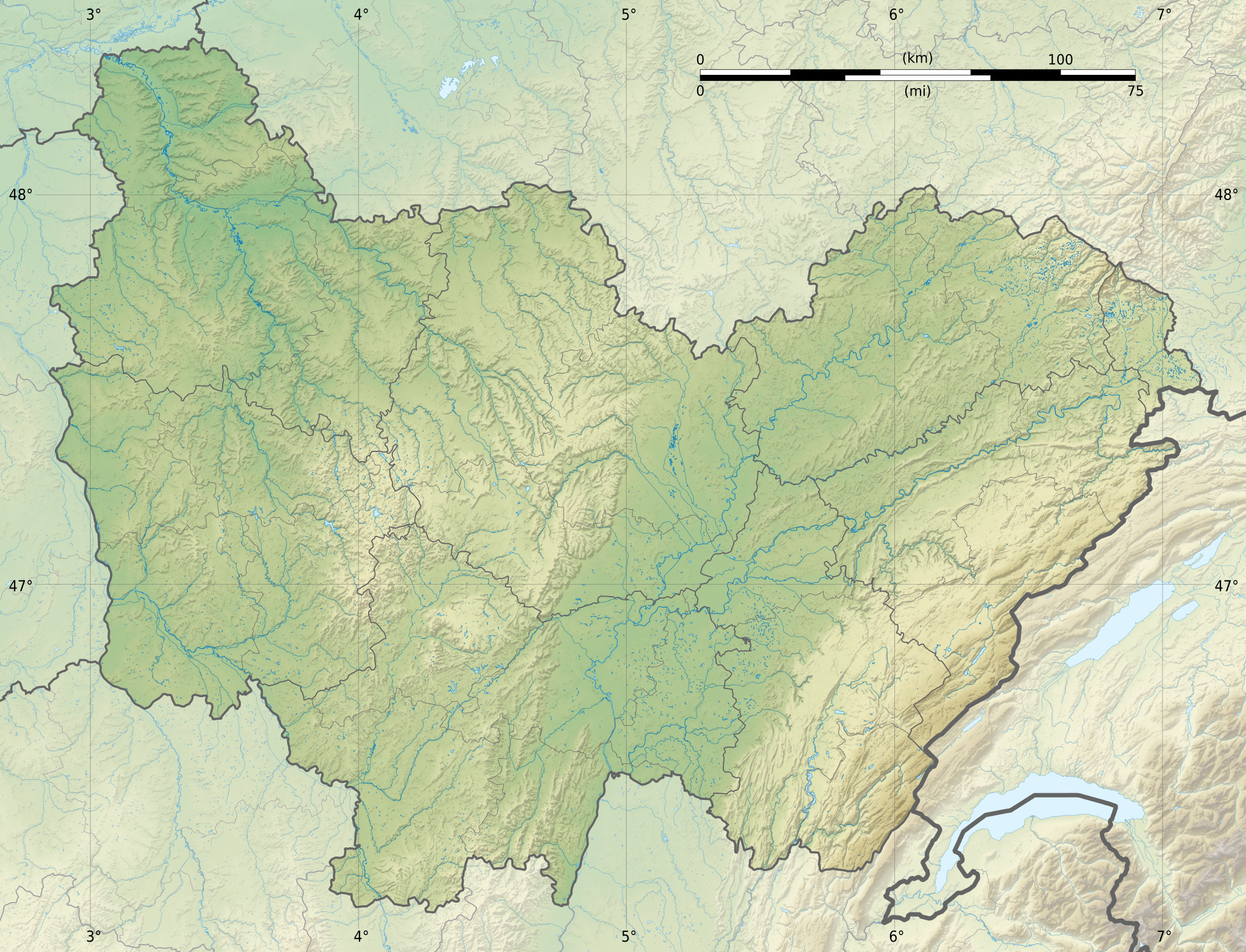
- Location within France Location within Bourgogne-Franche-Comté

Location
- Country: France

Physical characteristics
- Mouth: Ognon
  - coordinates: 47.5555°N 6.4382°E
- Length: 20.4 km (12.7 mi)

Basin features
- Progression: Ognon→ Saône→ Rhône→ Mediterranean Sea

The Scey (French pronunciation: [sɛ]) is a 20.4 km long river that traverses the Doubs and Haute-Saône departments in the Bourgogne-Franche-Comté region in eastern France. It rises in Marvelise and flows generally west to join the Ognon in Villersexel. Its tributaries include the Rognon.
