= Ognon (Franche-Comté) =

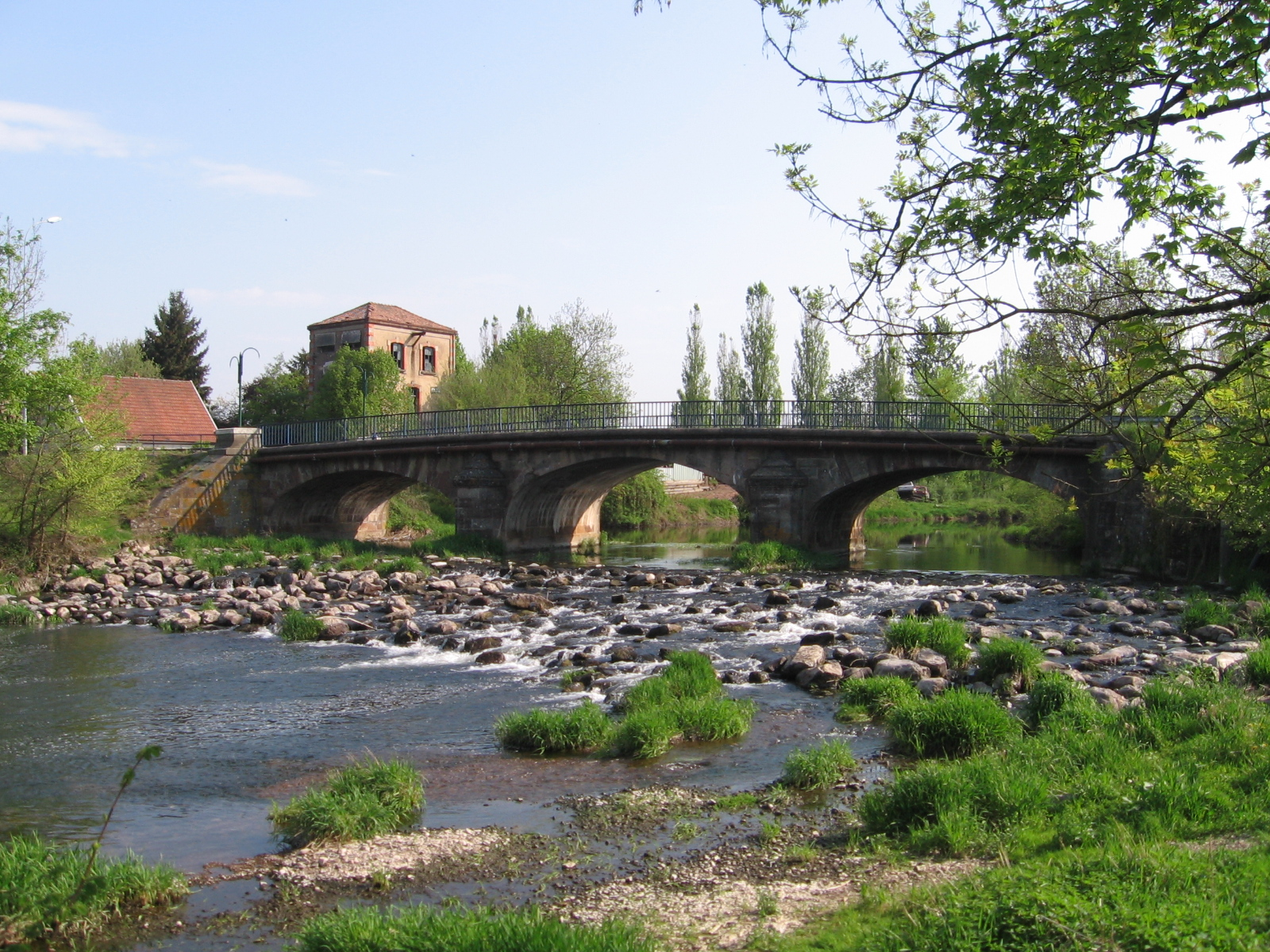
- The Ognon near Lure

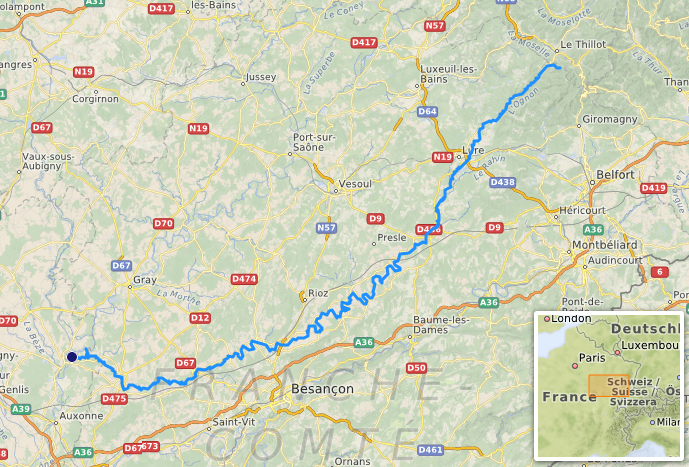
- Path of the Ognon

Location
- Country: France

Physical characteristics
- Source
  - location: Vosges Mountains
  - elevation: ±900 m (3,000 ft)
- Mouth
  - location: Saône
  - coordinates: 47°18′51″N 5°26′4″E
- Length: 214 km (133 mi)
- Basin size: 2,308 km^{2} (891 mi^{2})
- Discharge
  - average: 36 m^{3}/s (1,300 cu ft/s)

Basin features
- Progression: Saône→ Rhône→ Mediterranean Sea

The Ognon (French pronunciation: [ɔɲɔ̃]) is a river of Eastern France. It is a left tributary of the Saône, which it joins in Pontailler-sur-Saône. Its source is in Haut-du-Them-Château-Lambert in the Vosges Mountains near the Ballon d'Alsace. Its length is 214 km (133 mi) and its basin area is 2,308 km^{2} (891 mi^{2}).

The Ognon flows through the following departments and towns: Haute-Saône, with Mélisey, Lure, Villersexel, Pesmes; Doubs, with Rougemont; Jura; Côte-d'Or, with Pontailler-sur-Saône.

== Tributaries ==
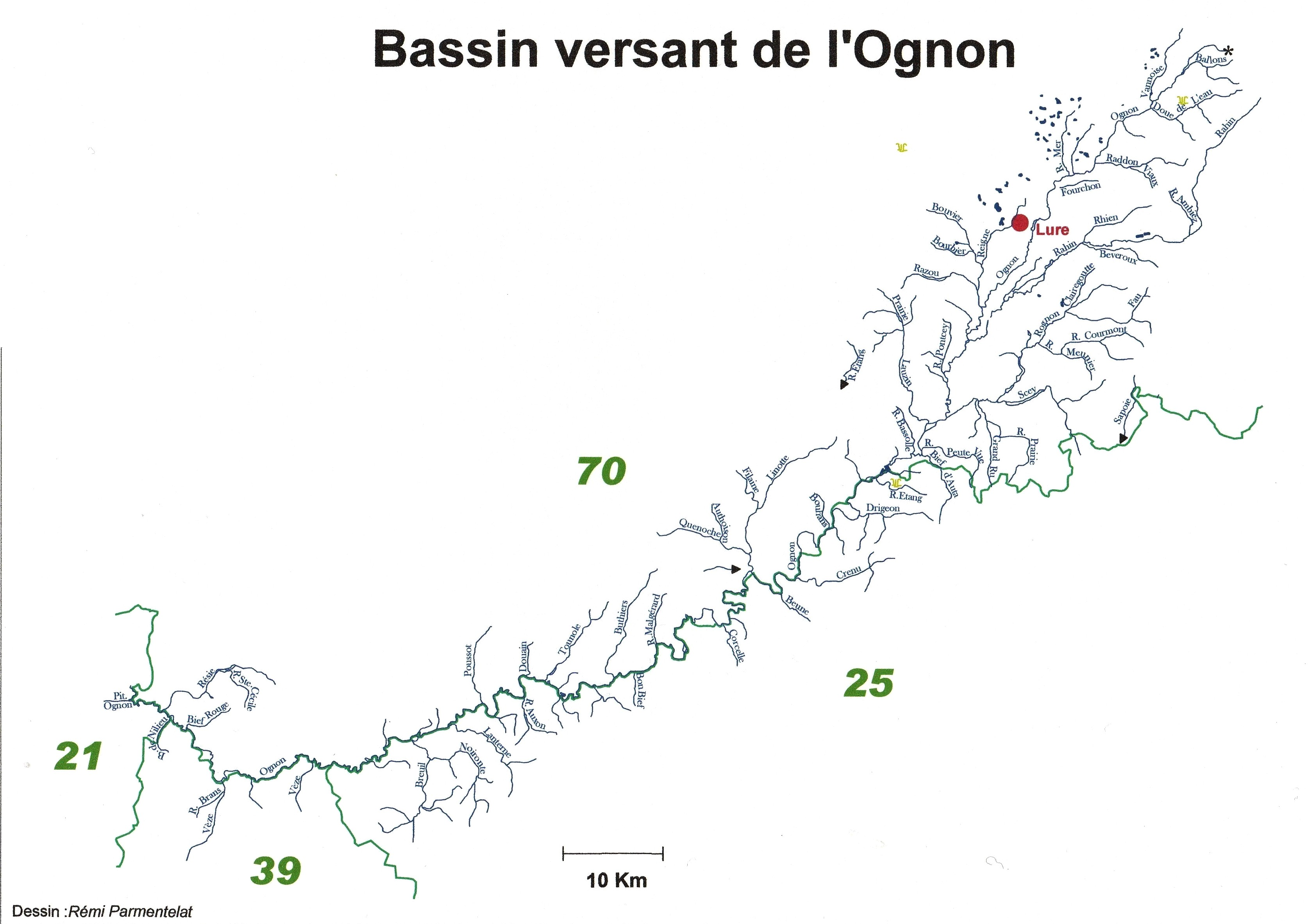
Tributaries

Some of its tributaries include:

- The Rahin
- The Scey
- The Reigne
- The Buthiers
