= Pesmes =

- Commune
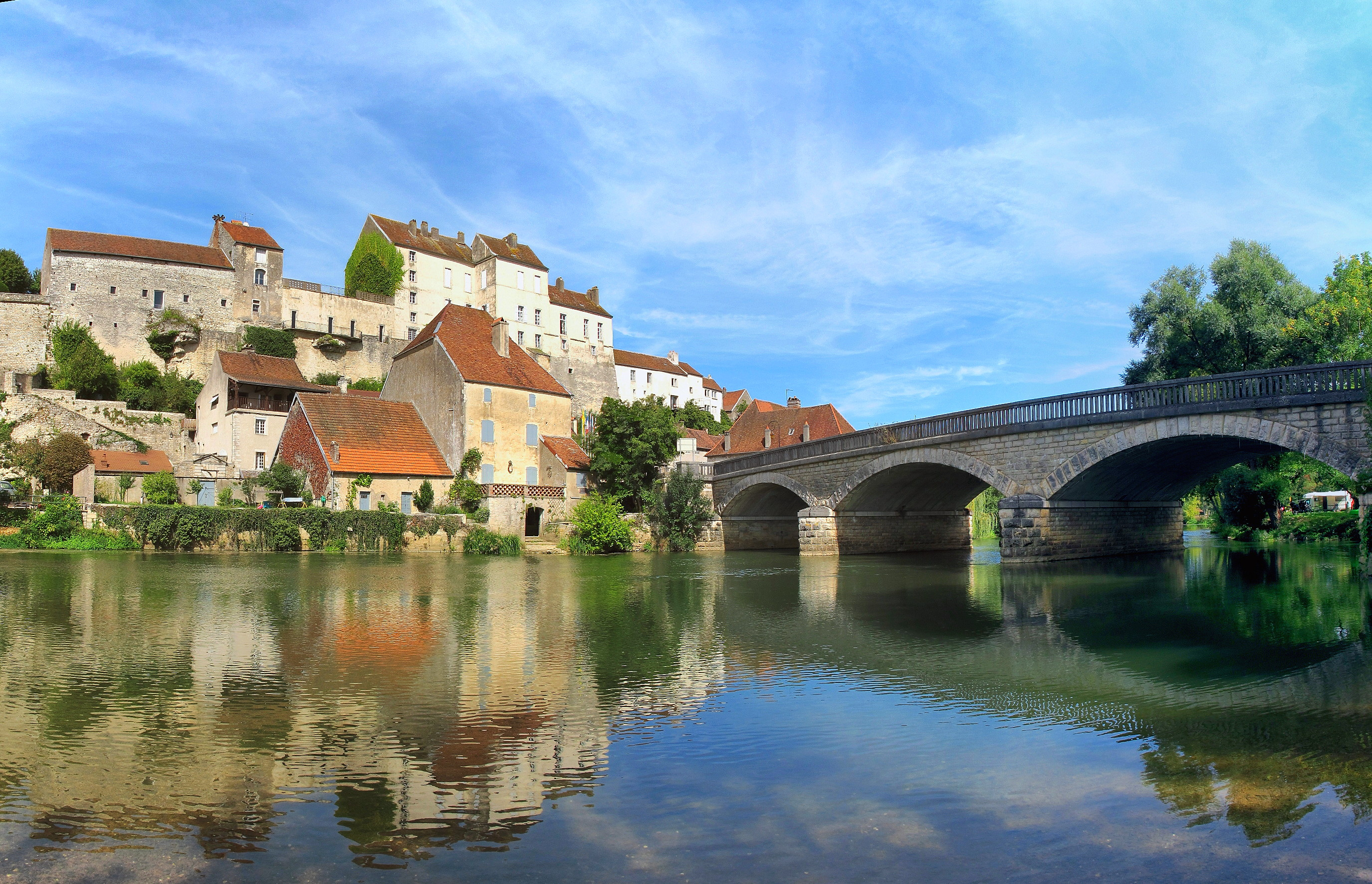
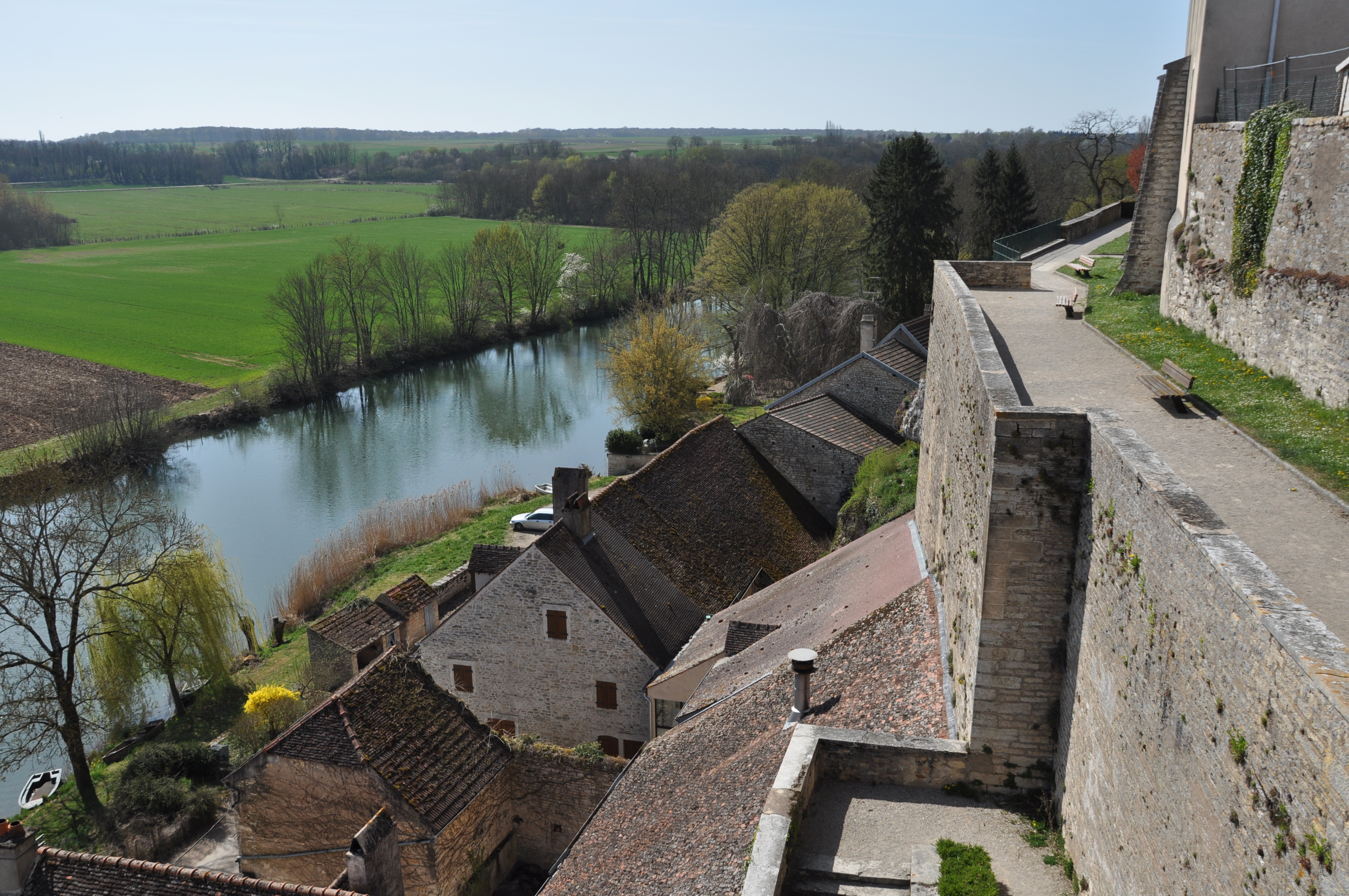
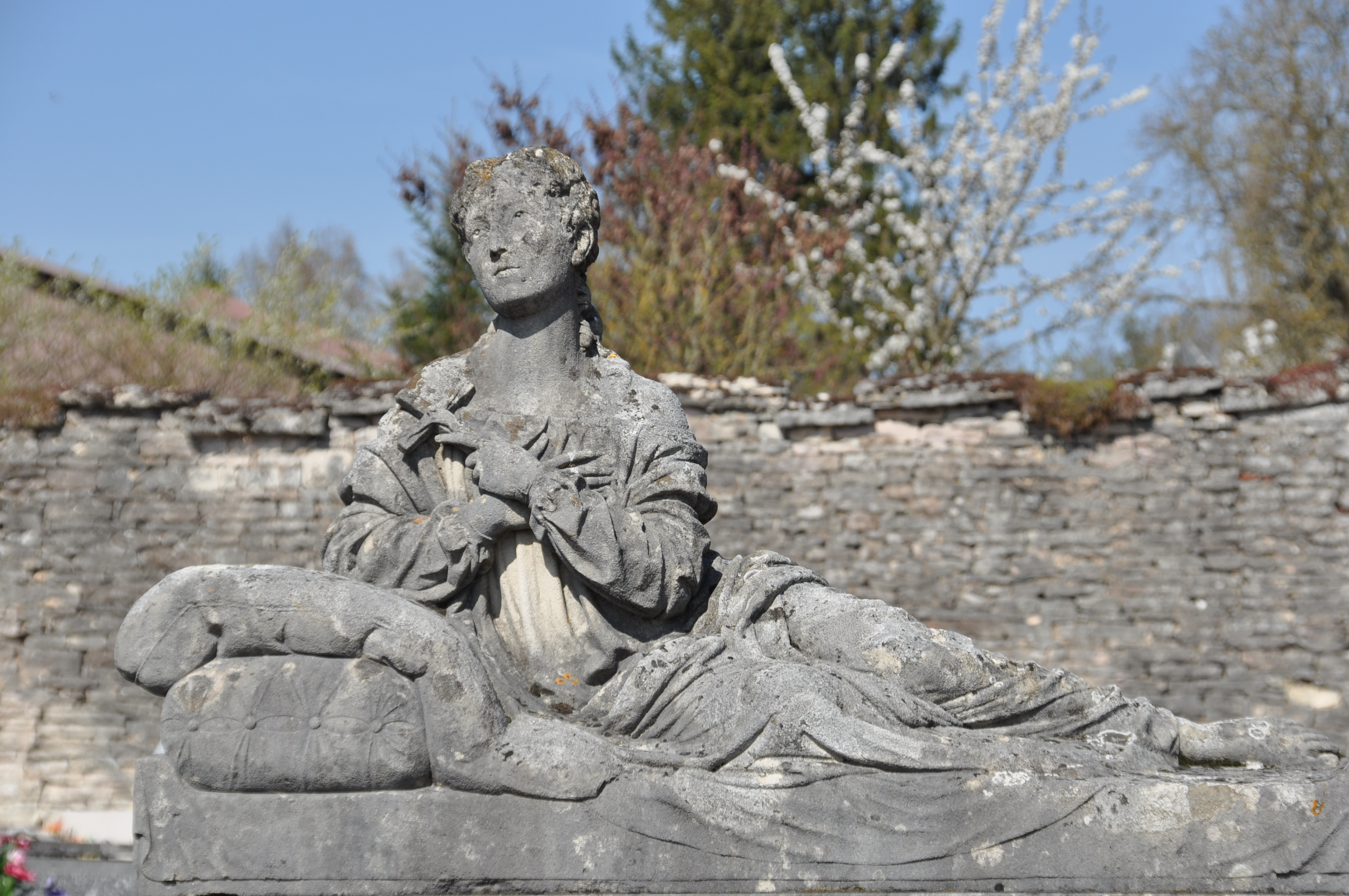
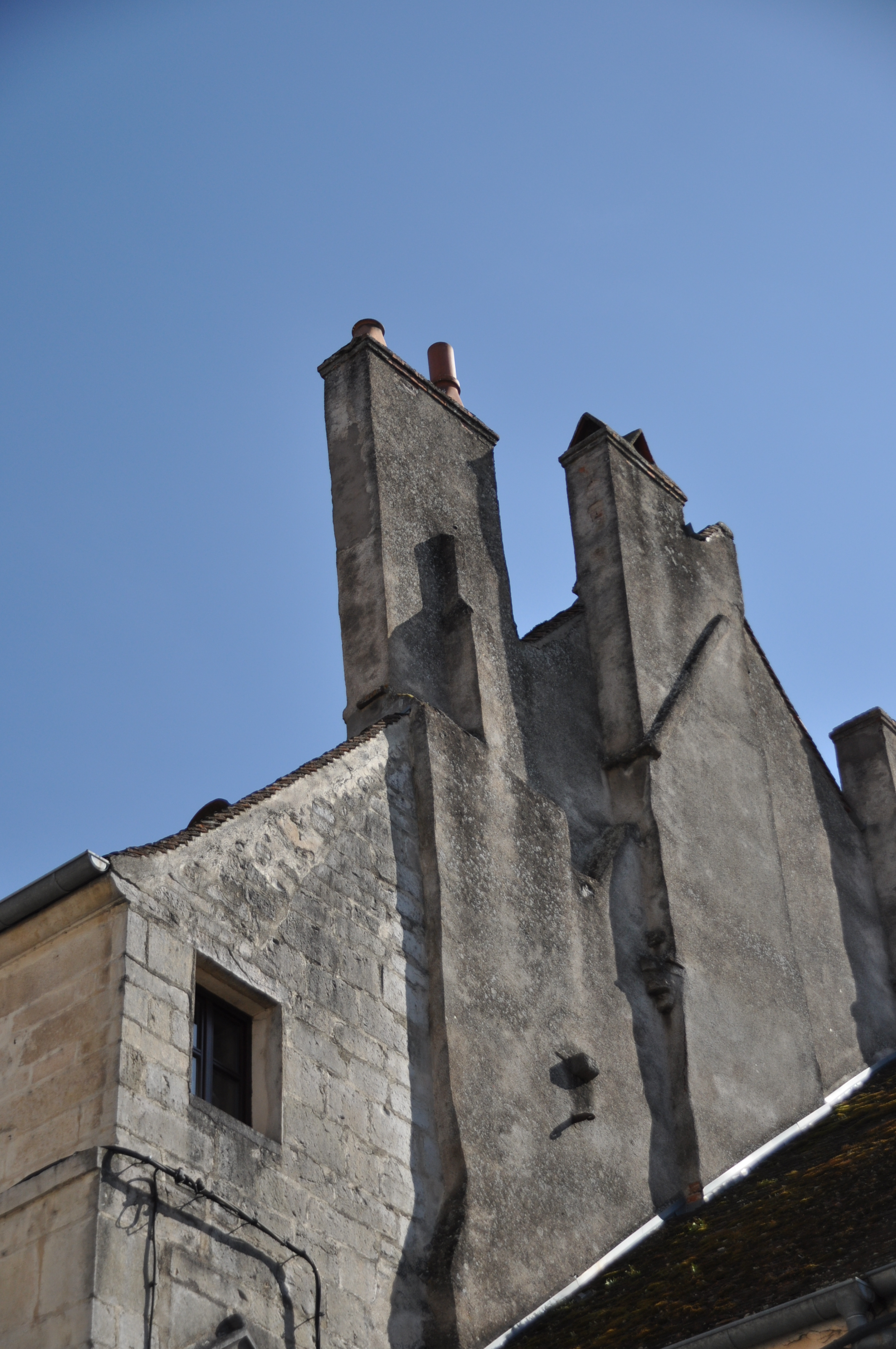
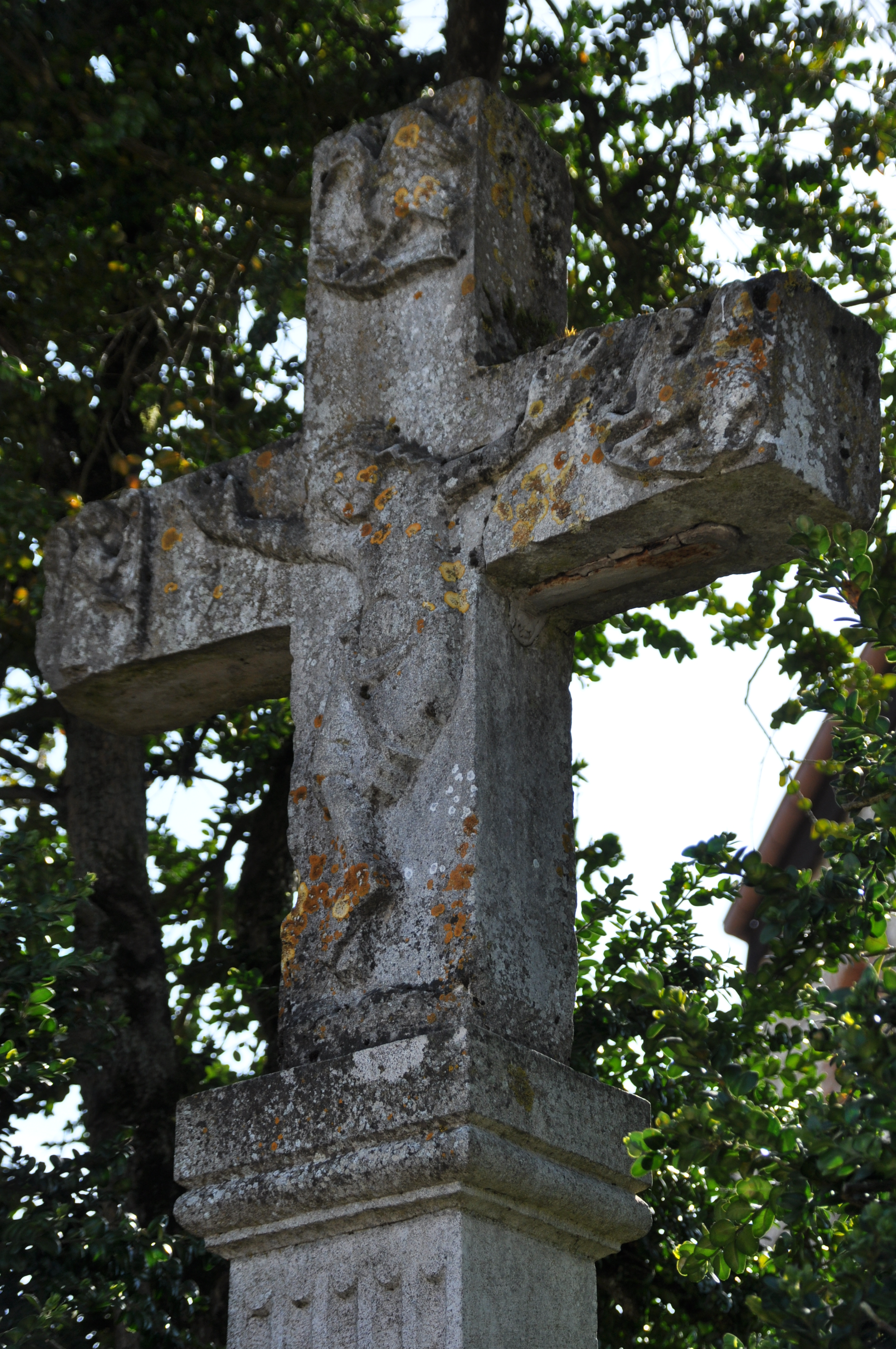
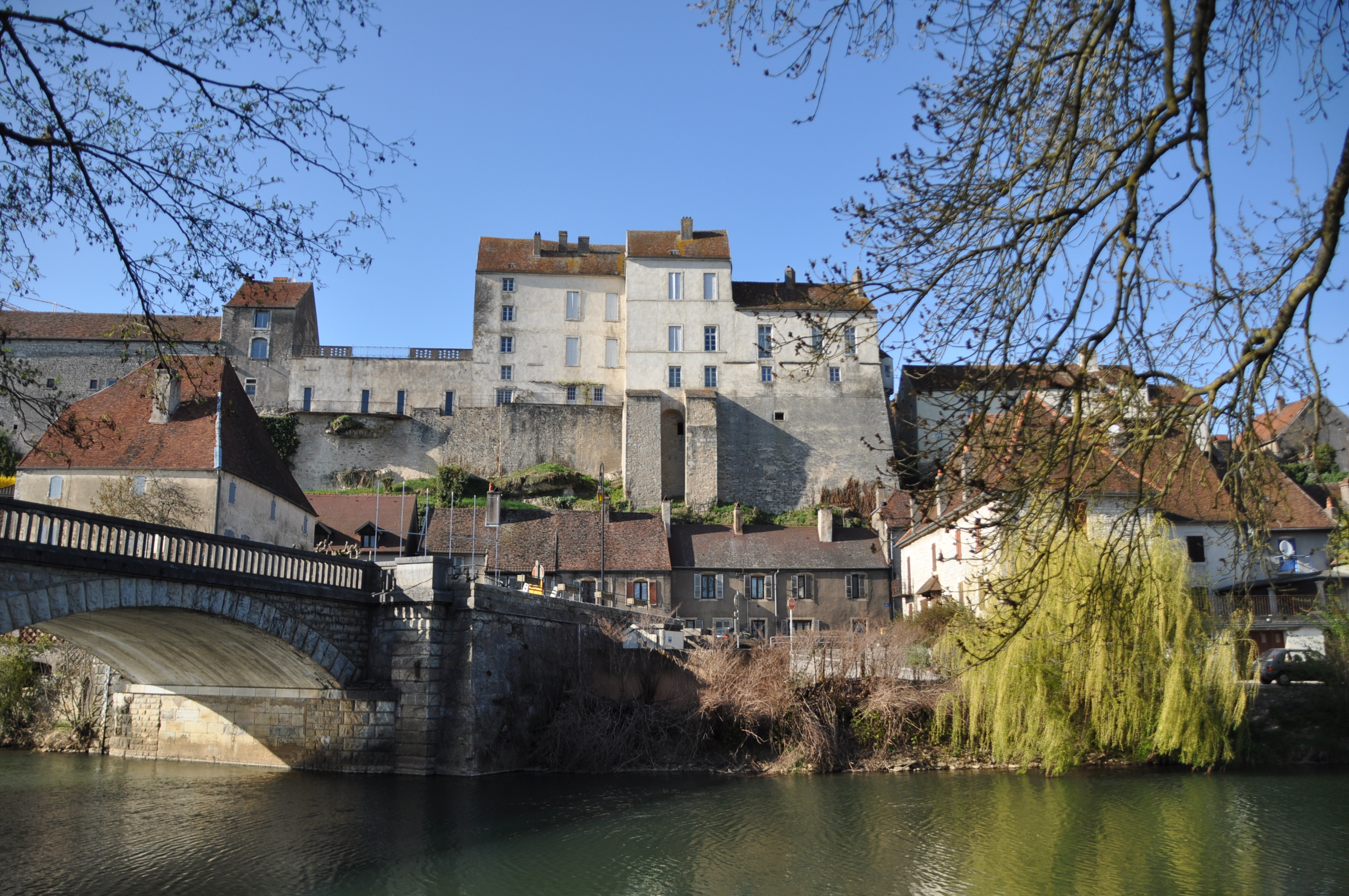
- Maison Royale

- Coat of arms
- Location of Pesmes
- Location within France Location within Bourgogne-Franche-Comté
- Coordinates: 47°16′50″N 5°33′56″E
- Country: France
- Region: Bourgogne-Franche-Comté
- Department: Haute-Saône
- Arrondissement: Vesoul
- Canton: Marnay

Government
  - Mayor (2020–2026): Frédérick Henning
- Area^{1}: 18.64 km^{2} (7.20 sq mi)
- Highest elevation: 291 m (955 ft)
- Lowest elevation: 187 m (614 ft)
- Population (2023): 1,083
  - Density: 58.10/km^{2} (150.5/sq mi)
- Time zone: UTC+01:00 (CET)
  - Summer (DST): UTC+02:00 (CEST)
- INSEE/Postal code: 70408 /70140
- ^{1} French Land Register data, which excludes lakes, ponds, glaciers > 1 km^{2} (0.386 sq mi or 247 acres) and river estuaries.

Pesmes (French pronunciation: [pɛm]) is a commune in the Haute-Saône department in the region of Bourgogne-Franche-Comté in eastern France. It is a member of Les Plus Beaux Villages de France (The Most Beautiful Villages of France) Association.

== See also ==
- Communes of the Haute-Saône department
