= Foreign relations of the Comoros =

In November 1975, Comoros became the 143rd member of the United Nations. The new nation was defined as consisting of the entire archipelago, despite the fact that France maintains control over Mayotte.

== Overview ==
Comoros also is a member of the African Union, the Arab League, the European Development Fund, the World Bank, the International Monetary Fund, the Indian Ocean Commission, and the African Development Bank.

The government fostered close relationships with the more conservative (and oil-rich) Arab states, such as Saudi Arabia and Kuwait. It frequently received aid from those countries and the regional financial institutions they influenced, such as the Arab Bank for Economic Development in Africa and the Arab Fund for Economic and Social Development. In October 1993, Comoros joined the League of Arab States, after having been rejected when it applied for membership initially in 1977.

Regional relations generally were good. In 1985 Madagascar, Mauritius, and Seychelles agreed to admit Comoros as the fourth member of the Indian Ocean Commission (IOC), an organization established in 1982 to encourage regional cooperation. In 1993 Mauritius and Seychelles had two of the five embassies in Moroni, and Mauritius and Madagascar were connected to the republic by regularly scheduled commercial flights.

In November 1975, Comoros became the 143d member of the UN. In the 1990s, the republic continued to represent Mahoré in the UN. Comoros was also a member of the OAU, the EDF, the World Bank, the IMF, the IOC, and the African Development Bank.

Comoros thus cultivated relations with various nations, both East and West, seeking to increase trade and obtain financial assistance. In 1994, however, it was increasingly facing the need to control its expenditures and reorganize its economy so that it would be viewed as a sounder recipient of investment. Comoros also confronted domestically the problem of the degree of democracy the government was prepared to grant to its citizens, a consideration that related to its standing in the world community.

== Diplomatic relations ==
List of countries which the Comoros maintains diplomatic relations with:

#	Country	Date
1	China	13 November 1975
2	North Korea	13 November 1975
3	Syria	25 November 1975
4	Russia	6 January 1976
5	Libya	1 April 1976
6	Kuwait	3 May 1976
7	Iraq	1 June 1976
8	Czech Republic	7 June 1976
9	Egypt	28 June 1976
10	India	June 1976
11	Senegal	10 July 1976
12	Romania	12 August 1976
13	Iran	September 1976
14	Italy	1 November 1976
15	Madagascar	12 November 1976
16	Belgium	15 November 1976
17	Serbia	24 November 1976
18	Cuba	21 December 1976
19	Tanzania	1976
20	Tunisia	1976
21	Netherlands	21 February 1977
22	Switzerland	1 March 1977
23	United Arab Emirates	2 June 1977
24	Bulgaria	6 June 1977
25	Poland	6 June 1977
26	Canada	16 June 1977
27	United States	15 August 1977
28	United Kingdom	3 October 1977
29	Japan	14 November 1977
30	Hungary	30 November 1977
31	Finland	19 December 1977
32	Sweden	1977
33	Luxembourg	1 February 1978
34	Germany	2 February 1978
35	France	1 July 1978
36	Morocco	1978
37	South Korea	19 February 1979
38	Algeria	27 February 1979
39	Turkey	22 August 1979
40	Oman	9 January 1981
41	Guinea	11 August 1981
42	Denmark	1 December 1981
43	Nigeria	5 November 1982
44	Spain	1 March 1983
45	Indonesia	19 March 1983
46	Maldives	20 July 1983
47	Australia	27 July 1983
48	Pakistan	19 October 1983
49	Djibouti	29 March 1984
50	Bahrain	1984
—	Qatar (suspended)	1984
51	Saudi Arabia	1984
52	Yemen	6 January 1985
53	Mauritius	25 February 1985
54	Mozambique	20 June 1985
55	Thailand	15 July 1986
56	Seychelles	30 June 1988
57	Argentina	28 September 1988
58	Colombia	3 October 1988
59	Bolivia	3 April 1989
60	Venezuela	26 October 1990
—	State of Palestine	1990
61	Bosnia and Herzegovina	10 December 1992
62	South Africa	14 May 1993
63	Ukraine	23 July 1993
64	Portugal	27 December 1996
65	Brunei	16 February 1999
66	Croatia	29 June 1999
67	North Macedonia	29 June 2000
68	Malaysia	2000
69	Iceland	29 October 2004
70	Cyprus	10 November 2004
71	Angola	22 December 2004
72	Brazil	25 March 2005
73	Uzbekistan	21 May 2005
74	Zambia	22 February 2007
75	Austria	8 March 2007
76	Armenia	2 July 2008
77	Andorra	8 July 2008
78	Mexico	13 October 2008
79	Saint Vincent and the Grenadines	24 September 2008
80	Uruguay	14 May 2009
81	Azerbaijan	1 January 2010
82	Cambodia	22 February 2010
83	Latvia	24 February 2010
84	Georgia	26 March 2010
85	Estonia	30 November 2010
86	Montenegro	9 February 2011
87	Solomon Islands	14 February 2011
88	Slovenia	25 April 2011
89	Sudan	16 August 2011
90	Philippines	25 November 2011
91	Mongolia	5 December 2011
92	Kazakhstan	29 March 2012
93	Tuvalu	5 April 2012
94	Equatorial Guinea	29 August 2012
95	Singapore	8 April 2013
96	Lithuania	26 September 2013
97	Fiji	7 November 2013
98	Bangladesh	14 October 2014
99	Mauritania	29 December 2014
—	Kosovo	28 May 2015
100	Ghana	5 July 2015
101	Vietnam	24 September 2015
102	Ecuador	15 October 2015
103	Ivory Coast	16 February 2016
104	Mali	16 February 2016
105	Slovakia	6 June 2017
106	Ireland	2017
107	Benin	17 May 2018
108	South Sudan	17 May 2018
109	Tajikistan	17 August 2018
110	Jordan	2 September 2018
111	Botswana	26 September 2018
112	Uganda	24 October 2018
113	Norway	28 June 2019
114	Nicaragua	18 September 2019
115	Niger	21 November 2020
116	Gambia	11 October 2021
117	Namibia	20 October 2021
118	Malawi	7 October 2022
119	Republic of the Congo	3 February 2023
120	Kenya	1 September 2023
121	Cape Verde	25 April 2024
122	Saint Kitts and Nevis	28 September 2024
123	Rwanda	5 July 2025
124	Somalia	8 July 2025
125	Dominica	23 September 2025
126	Burundi	4 February 2026
127	Vanuatu	22 September 2026
128	Bahamas	24 September 2026
129	Kyrgyzstan	24 September 2026
130	Ethiopia	Unknown
131	Greece	Unknown
132	Lebanon	Unknown

== Bilateral relations ==
Country	Formal Relations Began	Notes
Belgium	15 November 1976	Both countries established diplomatic relations on 15 November 1976; Comoros maintains an embassy in Brussels.
China	13 November 1975	See China–Comoros relations Both countries established diplomatic relations on 13 November 1975 Comoros also hosted an embassy of China, which established relations during the Soilih regime. The Chinese had long been a source of aid and apparently wished to maintain contact with Comoros to counterbalance Indian and Soviet (later Russian) influence in the Indian Ocean. In August 2008, a Comorian delegation visited China on a good-will visit. Together with the Chinese defense minister Liang Guanglie, and Chief of Staff of the Comoros armed forces Salimou Mohamed Amiri, pledged to increase cooperation between the military of the two nations. Amiri stated that Comoros will continue to adhere to the One-China policy. A comprehensive Chinese-assisted treatment campaign has apparently eliminated malaria from the Comorian island of Moheli (population 36,000). Administered by Li Guoqiao at the Tropical Medicine Institute, the program relies on hybrid Artemisia annua of hybrid ancestry, which was used for a drug regimen by which all residents of the island, whether or not visibly ill, took two doses at a 40-day interval. This eliminated the human reservoir of the disease and reduced hospital admissions to 1% or less of January 2008 levels. Visitors to Moheli are now required to take antimalarial drugs, a mix of artemisinin, primaquine and pyrimethamine that China provides for free. When asked about Artemisia exports, Li was quoted, "We want to grow them in China and whatever we export depends on bilateral relationships." Comoros has requested a similar program for Grande Comore and Anjouan, total population 760,000, and Li said that Beijing has agreed in principle.
Cyprus		Cyprus is represented in Comoros by its embassy in Pretoria.
Denmark	1 December 1981	Denmark is represented in Comoros by its embassy in Dar es Salaam, Tanzania.
Finland	19 December 1977	Both countries established diplomatic relations on 19 December 1977 Comoros is represented in Finland by its embassy in Paris, France.
France	1 July 1978	See France–Comoros relations Both countries established diplomatic relations on 1 July 1978 Comoros' most significant international relationship is that with France. The three years of estrangement following the unilateral declaration of independence and the nationalistic Soilih regime were followed during the conservative Abdallah and Djohar regimes by a period of growing trade, aid, cultural, and defense links between the former colony and France, punctuated by frequent visits to Paris by the head of state and occasional visits by the French president to Moroni. The leading military power in the region, France has detachments on Mahoré and Réunion, and its Indian Ocean fleet sails the waters around the islands. France and Comoros signed a mutual security treaty in 1978; following the mercenary coup against Abdallah in 1989, French troops restored order and took responsibility for reorganizing and training the Comorian army. With Mahoré continuing to gravitate politically and economically toward France, and Comoros increasingly dependent on the French for help with its own considerable social, political, and economic problems, the issue of Mahoré diminished somewhat in urgency. Comoros claims French-administered Mayotte & the Glorioso Islands.
India	4 June 1976	See Comoros–India relations: Both countries established diplomatic relations in June 1976.; Both countries are full members of the Indian-Ocean Rim Association.
Indonesia	23 June 1983	Both countries established diplomatic relations on 23 June 1983: Indonesia is represented in Comoros by their embassy in Dar es Salaam.; Both countries are full members of the Organisation of Islamic Cooperation and of the Indian-Ocean Rim Association.
Ireland	24 October 2018	Ireland is represented in Comoros by its embassy in Dar es Salaam, Tanzania.
Italy	1 November 1976	Both countries established diplomatic relations on 1 November 1976: Comoros is represented in Italy by its embassy in Paris, France and an honorary consulate in Rome.; Italy is represented in Comoros by its embassy in Dar es Salaam, Tanzania and an honorary consulate in Anjouan.
Japan	14 November 1977	Comorian relations with Japan were also significant because Japan was the second largest provider of aid, consisting of funding for fisheries, food, and highway development.
Libya	1 April 1976	Both countries established diplomatic relations on 1 April 1976
Malaysia	2000	Both countries established diplomatic relations in 2000.
Mexico	13 October 2008	Both countries established diplomatic relations on 13 October 2008: The Comoros does not have an accreditation to Mexico.; Mexico is accredited to the Comoros from its embassy in Nairobi, Kenya.
Morocco		The two countries maintain diplomatic relations and signed 11 agreements in 2022.
Netherlands	21 February 1977	Comoros is represented in Netherlands by their embassy in Brussels, Belgium.; The Netherlands are represented in Comoros by their embassy in Dar es Salaam.
Niger		The two countries maintain cordial relations.
North Korea		See Comoros–North Korea relations Both countries established diplomatic relations on November 13, 1975.
Qatar		See Comoros–Qatar relations Comoros severed the diplomatic relations with Qatar in June 2017.
Saudi Arabia		Saudi Arabia has an embassy in Comoros.
Serbia	24 November 1976	Both countries established diplomatic relations on 24 November 1976. Serbia is represented in Comoros by its embassy in Nairobi, Kenya.
South Africa	14 May 1993	Both countries established diplomatic relations on 14 May 1993 The close relationship Comoros developed with South Africa in the 1980s was much less significant to both countries in the 1990s. With the reform of its apartheid government, South Africa no longer needed Comoros as evidence of its ostensible ability to enjoy good relations with a black African state; the end of the Cold War had also diminished Comoros' strategic value to Pretoria. Although South Africa continued to provide developmental aid, it closed its consulate in Moroni in 1992. Since the 1989 coup and subsequent expulsion of South African-financed mercenaries, Comoros likewise turned away from South Africa and toward France for assistance with its security needs.
Turkey	22 August 1979	See Comoros–Turkey relations: The Embassy of the Comoros in Cairo is accredited to Turkey.; The Turkish ambassador in Antananarivo to Madagascar is also accredited to the Union of the Comoros.; Trade volume between the two countries was US$21.1 million in 2019.
Ukraine	23 July 1993	Both countries established diplomatic relations on July 23, 1993.; Comoros has an honorary consulate in Kyiv.; Ukraine is represented in Comoros by its embassy in Nairobi, Kenya.
United Kingdom	3 October 1977	Both countries established diplomatic relations on 3 October 1977. Great-Britain is represented in Comoros by its embassy in Antananarivo, Madagascar.
United States	15 August 1977	See Comoros–United States relations Both countries established diplomatic relations on 15 August 1977. The American Embassy at Moroni was established on August 26, 1985, with Edward Brynn as Chargé d'Affaires ad interim. The American Embassy at Moroni was closed on September 30, 1993. Subsequent American Ambassadors to Comoros also have been accredited to Mauritius, and resident at Port Louis. On March 6, 2006, responsibilities for Comoros were transferred from Embassy Port Louis to Embassy Antananarivo. The two countries enjoy friendly relations. The historic under-commitment by the US within France's sphere of interest in the Indian Ocean looks set to continue after a November 2009 meeting between heads of state. Future friendly relations continue to look promising between the Comoros and America.
Uzbekistan	21 May 2005	Both countries established diplomatic relations on 21 May 2005; Both countries are full members of the Organisation of Islamic Cooperation.
Yemen	6 January 1985	Both countries established diplomatic relations on 6 January 1985 In April 2008, the Ministry of Agriculture and Irrigation of Yemen and Comoros Ministry of Fishery and Environment signed a "Memo of Understanding" (MOU) concerning agricultural cooperation.

== See also ==
- List of diplomatic missions in the Comoros
- List of diplomatic missions of the Comoros
