= Jacqueline Bassa-Mazzoni =

French diplomat

French ambassador to Comoros
- In office 12 September 2017 – 4 August 2021

French ambassador to Namibia
- In office 1 July 2013 – 27 April 2017

Personal details
- Born: Jacqueline Bassa; April 13, 1956 (age 70) Toulouse, France
- Awards: Legion of Honour (2016)

Jacqueline Bassa-Mazzoni (née Bassa, born 13 April 1956 in Toulouse) is a French diplomat. Between 2017 and 2021, she served as the French ambassador to Comoros, succeeding Robby Judes. Prior to that, between 2013 and 2017, she served as French ambassador to Namibia.
