= List of diplomatic missions of the Comoros =

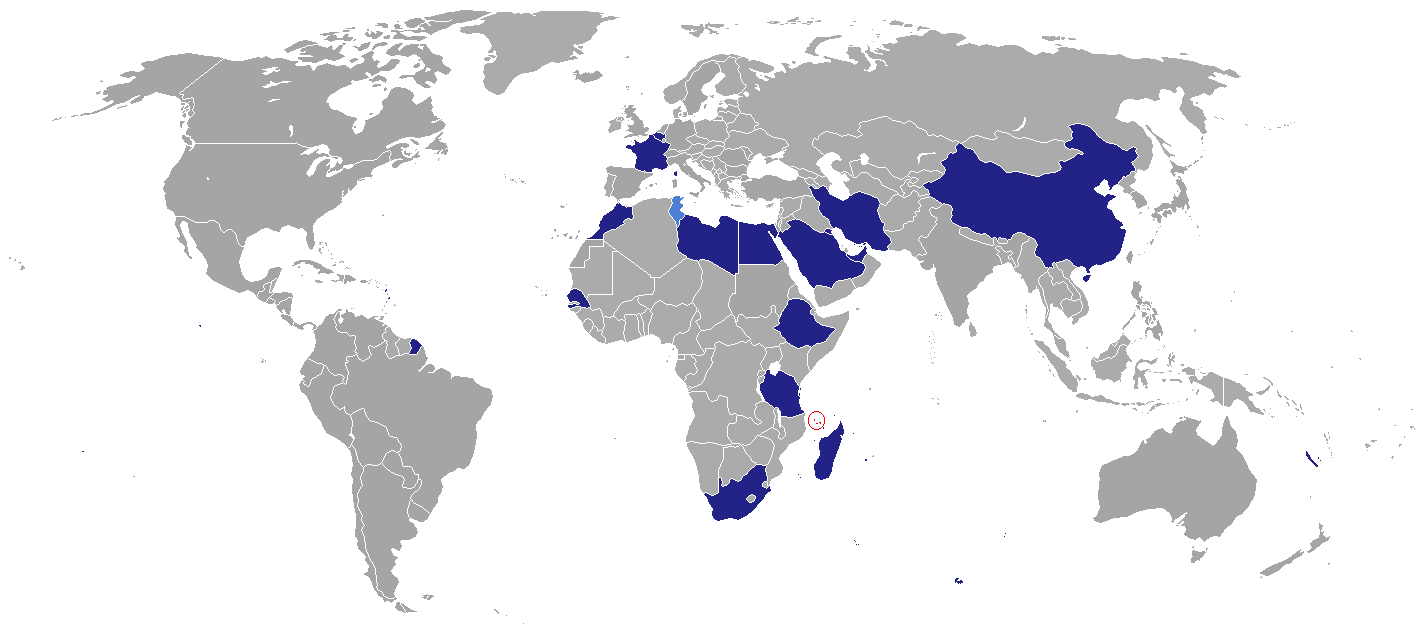
Map of Comoran diplomatic missions

This is a list of diplomatic missions of Comoros, excluding honorary consulates. Comoros is a small island nation in the Indian Ocean just north of Madagascar. It has a very modest diplomatic presence worldwide.

== Africa ==
- Egypt
  - Cairo (Embassy)
- Ethiopia
  - Addis Ababa (Embassy)
- Libya
  - Tripoli (Embassy)
- Madagascar
  - Antananarivo (Embassy)
  - Mahajanga (Consulate-General)
- Mauritius
  - Port Louis (Consulate-General)
- Morocco
  - Rabat (Embassy)
- Senegal
  - Dakar (Embassy)
- South Africa
  - Pretoria (Embassy)
- Tanzania
  - Dar es Salaam (Embassy)
- Tunisia
  - Tunis (Consulate-General)

== Asia ==
- China
  - Beijing (Embassy)
- Kuwait
  - Kuwait City (Embassy)
- Saudi Arabia
  - Riyadh (Embassy)
  - Jeddah (Consulate)
- United Arab Emirates
  - Abu Dhabi (Embassy)
  - Dubai (Consulate-General)

== Europe ==
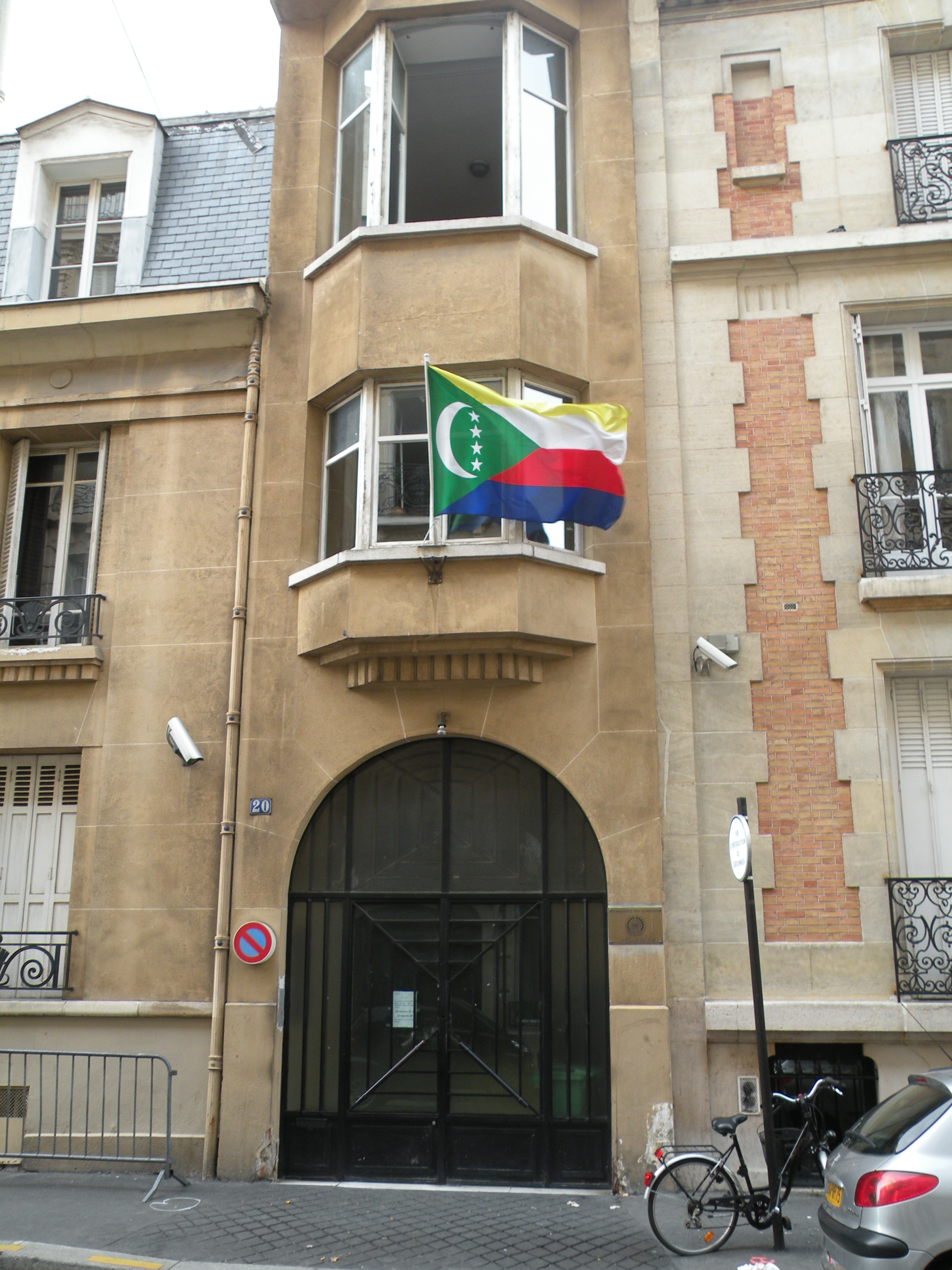
Embassy of Comoros in Paris

- Belgium
  - Brussels (Embassy)
- France
  - Paris (Embassy)

== Multilateral organizations ==
- Arab League
  - Cairo (Permanent Mission to the Arab League)
- United Nations
  - New York City (Permanent Mission to the United Nations)
- UNESCO
  - Paris (Delegation)

== Former Embassies ==
Iran Tehran (Embassy) (closed 13 January 2016)

Qatar Doha (Embassy) (closed 7 June 2017)

== See also ==
- Foreign relations of Comoros
- Visa policy of Comoros
