= Comoros–North Korea relations =

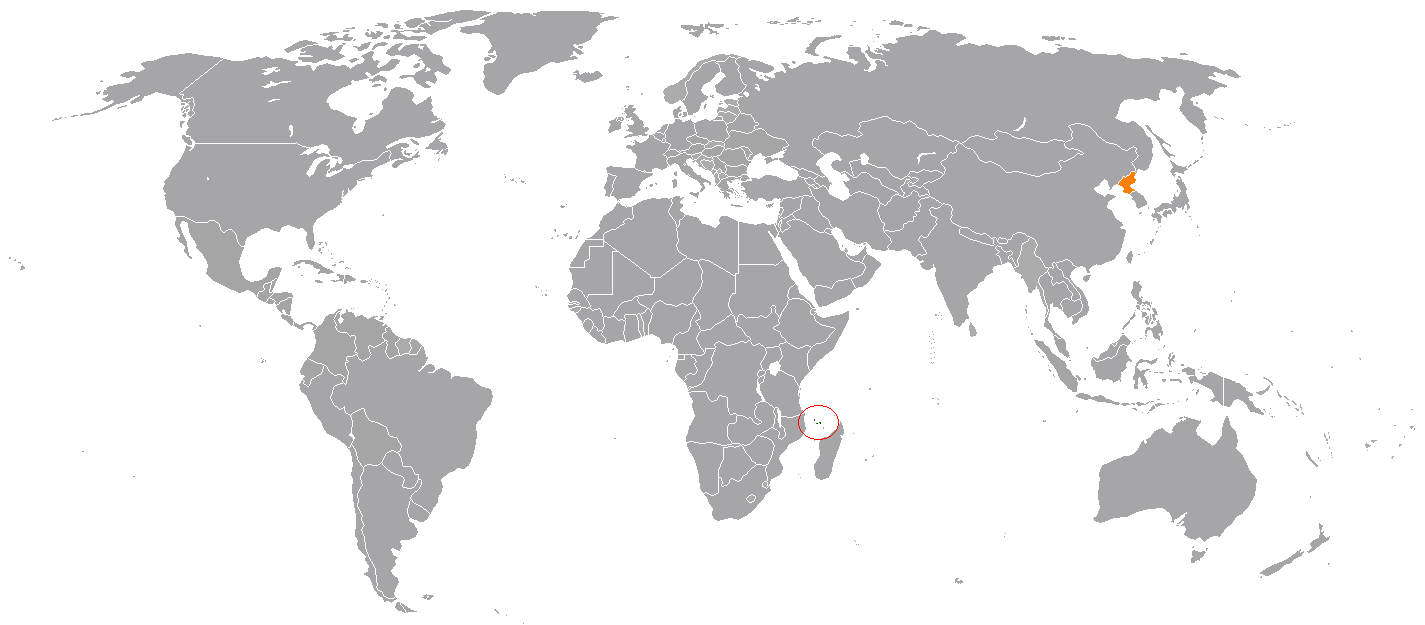

- Comoros: North Korea

Comoros–North Korea relations refers to the current and historical relationship between the Comoros and the Democratic People's Republic of Korea (DPRK), commonly known as North Korea. Neither nation maintains an embassy in their respective capitals. Formerly the DPRK had an ambassador stationed in Moroni.

== History ==
Diplomatic relations with North Korea were established soon after the Comoros gained its independence from France on 6 July 1975, on 13 November later that year. This was during the rule of Prince Said Mohamed Jaffar, who had replaced President Ahmed Abdallah in a coup only months before. He himself was replaced in January 1976 by Ali Soilih, a revolutionary Islamic socialist and anti-colonialist who established the a socialist regime in the Comoros. Soilih, in addition to implementing radical reforms, established close connections with many of the Cold War states which aided revolutionary movements. Among these were North Korea, which established an embassy in the Comoros within a year. On 18 January 1977, the first ambassador So Jinyong presented his credentials to Vice President Mohamed Hassan Ali, and made a visit to President Soilih.

The Maoist-inspired leader, whose Red Guard-esque militia and other armed forces received training from the left-wing Tanzanian regime of Julius Nyerere, also received some degree of aid from the North Koreans. On 15 March 1978, the North Korean ambassador presented a gift from Kim Il Sung to President Soilih, in response to which the Comoros expressed its "full support and firm solidarity with the Korean people's struggle" to achieve an independent and peaceful Korean reunification.

Only two months after this event Soilih was ousted and killed in a coup by French mercenaries, which reinstalled the former President Ahmed Abdallah. Abdallah's rule was strictly anti-communist, and on 3 December 1983 the Comoros became the only African state to break off diplomatic relations with the DPRK following the Rangoon bombing, when on 9 October that year the North Koreans attempted to assassinate the South Korean military ruler Chun Doo-hwan during a visit to Burma. For the remainder of his time in office, Abdallah maintained close relations with South Korea, visiting Seoul in 1987. Relations resumed in the 1990s, with the end of Abdallah's government in 1989, replaced by a long series of likewise unstable regimes.

== See also ==
- Foreign relations of the Comoros
- Foreign relations of North Korea
- China–Comoros relations
