= International Conference on Indian Ocean Studies =

The International Conference on Indian Ocean Studies (ICIOS) was an international symposium held in Perth, Western Australia in 1979 and 1984.

ICIOS I was held from 15 to 22 August 1979. ICIOS II was held from 5 to 12 December 1984.

== Way '79 ==
The first conference occurred during the Western Australian sesquicentenary celebrations known as WAY '79, as well as the Indian Ocean Arts Festival from 22 September 1979 to 6 October 1979 in Perth.

The conferences required collaboration and were supported by the Universities in operation in Perth at the time, the University of Western Australia, Western Australian Institute of Technology (now Curtin University), Murdoch University and the Western Australian College of Advanced Education (now Edith Cowan University).

The main organizers of the conferences were the late Frank Broeze and Kenneth McPherson, who had published on the region, before and after the conferences.

Subsequently a centre at Curtin, the Centre for Indian Ocean Regional Studies, operated between 1988 and 2000.

== See also ==
- Indian Ocean Rim Association for Regional Cooperation
