= 2017 IORA Summit =

2017 IORA Summit was held on March 5–7, 2017 in Jakarta Convention Centre, Indonesia, between the members of the Indian Ocean Rim Association. It was the first IORA Summit and the 20th IORA meeting, previous meetings were only minister level. China and Japan also attended the summit as dialogue partners. Some 12,000 security personnel, both the police and military, were deployed to secure the event.

== Guest ==
=== Indonesians ===
- Joko Widodo, President of Indonesia
- Jusuf Kalla, Vice President of Indonesia

=== Foreign Delegations ===
- Australia: Malcolm Turnbull, Prime Minister of Australia
- Bangladesh: Sheikh Hasina, Prime Minister of Bangladesh
- India: Hamid Ansari, Vice President of India
- Malaysia: Najib Razak, Prime Minister of Malaysia
- Mozambique: Filipe Nyusi, President of Mozambique
- Singapore: Teo Chee Hean, Deputy Prime Minister of Singapore
- Sri Lanka: Maithripala Sirisena, President of Sri Lanka
- South Africa: Jacob Zuma, President of South Africa
- Yemen: Abdrabbuh Mansur Hadi, President of Yemen
