= Enid Russell =

Australian lawyer

Enid Marjorie Russell (1904–1958) was a solicitor in Western Australia. She was the first female graduate of the University of Western Australia Law School. The year following graduation she was admitted as a legal practitioner in Western Australia and commenced practice, becoming the first Western Australian woman admitted to legal practice in Western Australia who practised in the state. She was also the first graduate of the University of Western Australia to be admitted to legal practice in that state.

== Early life ==
Enid Russell was born on 10 March 1904 in Perth, the daughter of lawyer Charles Townsend Russell, originally from Victoria, and his wife Adelaide (née Jones), from Albany. She was the older of two children, a son being born at some time in the next seven years.

The young Enid first came to public notice at the age of some three years, at the wedding of her father's sister in South Perth. The newspaper report of the wedding enthused that "[t]he bride was attended by her tiny neice [sic], Enid Russell, who wore a pretty white muslin frock, inlet with French Valencennes lace, and hat to match. She carried a basket of pink roses and maiden hair fern. She also wore a necklet, a gift from the bridegroom".

Enid's family experienced a major change with the sudden death of her father when she was about seven years old. Charles Russell was a senior partner with the respected firm Haynes, Robinson & Cox in Howard Street, Perth, having originally joined the firm in Albany where he met his wife. Russell had a history of heart disease, and this condition had become worse earlier in 1911, leading him to consult a specialist in Eastern Australia. He died suddenly after a game of golf near the family home in South Perth, and was much mourned by family and within the Perth legal community.

Enid attended Perth Central Girls' School for the primary school phase of her education, and was then successful in gaining, through examination, admission and a scholarship to Perth Modern School, a government-run academic excellence institution which had opened five years earlier.

Enid Russell was regularly mentioned in the local press as she grew up, engaging in the kind of social and educational pursuits typical of a girl from her social background. At the age of about 13 she was recorded as having achieved a Grade IV Pass in Theory of Music, an extracurricular course examined through the local university. A year or so later she took part in a summer lifesaving class organized by the South Perth Juvenile Swimming Club, and was awarded a Bronze Medallion at the subsequent examination; and at about the same time she was noted as being placed in a swimming event for her school, holding their annual swimming carnival in the Swan River at Claremont.

She matriculated from Perth Modern School in 1921 with passes in English, French, German, Mathematics and History.

== Beginning legal career, 1922–1935 ==
Russell initially studied commercial office practice for a year before commencing work as a typist at her father's former law firm, now renamed Robinson, Cox & Wheatley. Over several years she also undertook a Bachelor of Arts degree at the University of Western Australia, completing it in 1927. In the meantime, however, she persuaded her employer's firm to allow her to become an articled clerk, the means by which a legal practitioner became qualified in the days before university studies were available, and this arrangement commenced on 15 March 1926. Russell was the first woman in Western Australia to enter an articled clerkship; but with the commencement of the Law School at the University of WA in 1928 she then added a Bachelor of Laws degree to her resume, completing that in 1930.

As a result of her articles and her law degree, Russell was admitted as a legal practitioner in Western Australia on 17 March 1931, the first woman to be so admitted on the basis of studies completed in Western Australia, and the first to actively practice as a solicitor following her admission. (Alice Mary Cummins had been admitted to practice in Western Australia in 1930 on the basis of qualifications completed in South Australia, but she never entered legal practice). Russell continued to work for Robinson, Cox & Wheatley for the next several years.

In 1934, Russell began to indulge her desire to travel, moving to London and obtaining employment as a stenographer with the Agent-General for Western Australia. In October 1934 she was seconded to the ultimately unsuccessful Secession Delegation sent by the state government to present to the British government the results of the 1933 Secession Referendum held in that state, being the only female member of the delegation. Russell served as Secretary to the delegation, her role including the organization of a dinner for Western Australians in London in celebration of King George V's Silver Jubilee. The official report to the Western Australian Parliament at the conclusion of the delegation gave an appreciation of her work.

== Hiatus from the law – London and South Africa, 1936–1945 ==
Following her participation in the secession delegation, Russell continued to work in London, from where, later that year, she sent a contribution for the proposed memorial to one of her mentors at the University of WA, Professor Edward Shann, who had recently died in Adelaide in unclear and controversial circumstances.

Newspaper reporting about Russell's time in London is illustrative of social attitudes of the time towards professional women. Frequently her name occurs not in news items but in gossip columns, and despite being in her thirties she is often referred to as a "Perth girl". She was said to have been "working her way" while in London, hinting that it might be considered remarkable that a woman not be overseas simply enjoying a vacation. Her employment in London was varied, and seems not to have been in legal firms, probably because of the work required to be admitted to practice in England. One role she filled was as secretary to a radio broadcaster and author of children's books.

After being hosted at a number of "delightful farewell parties from informal Australians and formal English", Russell left London in August 1937 and travelled to South Africa, ostensibly for a stay of a few months with the intention of returning to Perth by January 1938. However, she remained in South Africa and by May 1938 had taken a position as Secretary to the Board of the Aero Club of South Africa in Johannesburg, a role which enabled her to travel extensively in southern Africa including the Rhodesias and other territories neighbouring South Africa.

Her return to Perth, repeatedly postponed as she took each new opportunity, was significantly delayed by the outbreak of World War II in 1939. Unable to travel home, Russell enlisted in the South African Women's Army Corps. In the army, she specialised in the new technology of radar, rising to the rank of Lieutenant by the war's end.

== Return to Western Australia and the law, 1945–1958 ==
Following the war, Russell finally returned to Perth and re-entered legal practice, at the same time being engaged by the University of WA Law School to lecture on a part-time basis between 1946 and 1951. She lectured in Private International Law, as well as serving as the Law School's librarian. She also worked on the editorial committee of the Law School's Annual Law Review, which commenced publication in 1948, and contributed an article to its second issue a year later.

In 1950, Russell was granted a year's leave from her position in the Law School as well as a grant of £800 ($1600) to research and write a history of the law in Western Australia. This project was intended in the first place to be submitted for her to qualify for the degree of Master of Laws, and later to be published. During this time she completed a significant amount of the research and drafted many chapters, but in the end this work was set aside and not completed or published during her lifetime. However, arising out of this research, she did deliver a paper to the Western Australian Historical Society, "Early Lawyers of Western Australia", which was subsequently published in the Society's annual journal and proceedings.

Russell was involved in a variety of women's community roles. In 1950 alone she was mentioned as the honorary secretary of the University of WA Women's University College Fund Committee, involved in raising funds to assist women in attending the university; and as a Commissioner of the Girl Guide movement in Western Australia.

In 1951, Russell left Perth and commenced working as a solicitor in the practice of Alec Edwin Ball in the Western Australian country town of Harvey, jointly with another solicitor taking over the practice towards the end of the year as Ball prepared to take up a non-legal educational appointment. While at Harvey she continued to involve herself in the local community such as through work with the Girl Guides.

She continued to work for several more years at Harvey, but by 1958 she had been diagnosed with cancer, and so she returned to South Perth where she had grown up, working when she was well enough in the Perth firm Downing & Downing. She died on 24 September 1958, at the age of only 54 years. She was buried in Karrakatta Cemetery in Perth. Throughout her professional life she had worked to promote university education for women, and her estate especially endowed the University of WA with funds for the establishment of a women's college.

== Legacy ==
The major publication of her professional life, which remained incomplete at her death, was A History of the Law in Western Australia. Some twenty years after her death, this book was edited and completed by two Perth barristers and was published by University of Western Australia Press as part of the WAY 79 celebrations of Western Australia's sesquicentenary in 1979.

== See also ==
- First women lawyers around the world
- List of first women lawyers and judges in Oceania
