= Indian Ocean Research Group =

The Indian Ocean Research Group Inc. (IORG) is an Indian Ocean Regional academic network. The key objective of IORG is to initiate a policy-oriented dialogue, in the true spirit of partnership, among governments, industries, NGOs and communities, towards realizing a shared, peaceful, stable and prosperous future for the Indian Ocean region. IORG is currently based at the University of Adelaide, and Curtin University, Australia, South Asian University, New Delhi and Panjab University, Chandigarh, but members come from all across the world.

== Overview ==
The key objective of the Indian Ocean Research Group Inc. is to initiate a policy-oriented dialogue, in the true spirit of partnership, among governments, industries, NGOs and communities, towards realizing a shared, peaceful, stable and prosperous future for the Indian Ocean region.

The Indian Ocean possesses considerable and often underrated geopolitical significance if only because of its operation as a highway. Given its relative location and the fact that it provides a relatively short and economic link between the Pacific and the Atlantic Oceans it is perhaps not surprising that, not only does the Ocean account for the transportation of the highest tonnage of commodities in the world, but that more than three-quarters of this is extra-regional trade. The uninhibited maintenance of Ocean routes and associated choke points is especially significant for the movement of commodities, especially oil, to Northeast Asia, Western Europe and North America.

The Indian Ocean is known to contain natural resources, the significance of which has yet to be fully determined. The Indian Ocean Marine Affairs Cooperation (IOMAC) grouping, for example, has already been involved for several years in issues associated with the management of the Indian Ocean tuna fishery. The exploitation of these resources, among others, in the context of the delimitation of exclusive economic zones requires careful monitoring and inter-state collaboration.

Maintaining the integrity of the regional environment is one of the most important common interests of Indian Ocean states. Monitoring and managing the environmental impacts of human activity on the Ocean is essential to the maintenance of the living resources of the Ocean, for example. Environmental security issues are extremely diverse, ranging from, for example, an industrial partner's need to secure access to resources for investment purposes, to a specific community's need to secure access to healthy and sustainable sources of food, water and shelter. Fostering inter-state cooperation in order to maximize positive management to minimize environmental insecurity is an important policy goal.

For the maintenance of the peace and stability of the Indian Ocean Region, it is of the utmost importance that regional, coastal, island, and landlocked states become aware of the geopolitical orientations of one another and of Indian Ocean neighbours.

The description, collation and analysis of such orientations and their assistance in the maximization of regional transparency regarding regional state goals and intentions is among IORG's key objectives.

== Objectives ==
IORG Inc. has seven principal objectives:

1. To encourage research on geopolitical, economic, socio-cultural, environmental, scientific and technological issues relevant to the Indian Ocean Region.

2. To promote dialogue on the peaceful uses and ecologically sustainable development of maritime resources based on the principle of Common Heritage.

3. To foster interstate cooperation in the sustainable management of ocean resources and the peaceful resolution of maritime disputes.

4. To ensure a holistic discourse on the human and environmental security of the Region among its states, peoples and communities.

5. To contribute to an understanding of the causes as well as the effects of a wide range of non-traditional regional security threats.

6. To facilitate information flow and discussion on international maritime regimes and the rights of states and local communities representing the Indian Ocean Region.

7. To initiate informed policy debate among governments, NGOs, business groups, academics, and other stakeholders in the Indian Ocean Region on issues of common concern.

== Current Research Projects ==
Building an Indian Ocean Region (Australian Research Council funded project)

ARC Discovery Project, 2012 – 2015 Discovery (Project 120101166, $378,000) administered by the University of Adelaide.

Chief Investigators: Prof. Timothy Doyle (the University of Adelaide); Prof. Dennis Rumley (Curtin University); Prof. Sanjay Chaturvedi (Panjab University); Prof. Clive Schofield (the University of Wollongong); Prof. Mohamed Salih (the University of Rotterdam; and Prof. Kanishka Jayasuriya (the University of Adelaide).

The project critically analyses (re)emergent and contested regionalisms in an area of global geo-strategic political concern and one of great and increasing significance: the Indian Ocean Region. It documents current attempts at building pan and sub-regional identities and institutions – with particular reference to the Indian Ocean Rim Association (IORA), currently the most ambitious region-building venture. Non-traditional security approaches will be particularly investigated as means of building bridges and creating regional dialogues. Finally, the project analyses how various notions of regionalism can be used to facilitate the process of ‘building’ an Indian Ocean region.

Aims of the Research:

• Initiate research on geopolitical, economic, socio-cultural, environmental, scientific and technological issues relevant to the Indian Ocean Region (IOR)

• Promote dialogue on the peaceful uses and ecologically sustainable development of maritime resources based on the principle of common heritage

• Foster inter-state cooperation on the sustainable management of ocean resources and the peaceful resolution of maritime disputes

• Ensure a holistic discourse on the human and environmental security of IOR among its states, peoples and communities

• Contribute to an understanding of the causes as well as the effects of a wide range of non-traditional IOR security threats, specifically including the blue economy agenda

• Facilitate information flow and discussion on international maritime regimes and the rights of states and local communities representing the IOR

• Encourage informed policy debate among governments, NGOs, business groups, academics and other stakeholders in the IOR on issues of common concern.

Research Themes:

1 Constructing Indian Ocean Regionalism

2 Traditional security in the Indian Ocean Region

3 Human Security

4 Economic and Resource Security

5 Maritime Security

6 Environmental Security

== Events and Dialogue ==
Indian Ocean Dialogue 2015 - Perth, Western Australia

Professors Dennis Rumley and Tim Doyle attended the second Indian Ocean Dialogue in Perth, Western Australia. The Indian Ocean Dialogue is an annual meeting involving representatives from each of the twenty Indian Ocean Rim Association member states as well as the six dialogue partners. Representatives include government officials, experts from academia and research institutions, and accredited observers. The Indian Ocean Dialogue 2015 was organised by Future Directions International, and the Department of Foreign Affairs and Trade (Government of Australia), with support from the Indian Ocean Rim Association Secretariat and the Australian Department of Immigration and Border Protection.

The key themes of this two-day event were:

• combatting transnational crime

• maritime security and defence cooperation

• regional cooperation in search and rescue operations

• the Blue Economy as a driver of economic growth.

Meeting of Indian Ocean Rim Association Academic Group (IORAG) in Jakarta, August 2015: "Developing a Research Programme for IORAG"

Profs. Tim Doyle and Dennis Rumley were both invited to attend the National Working Committee of The Indian Ocean Rim Academic Group (IORAG) held in Jakara, Indonesia on 14 August. Tim Doyle was invited as the current Chair of IORAG and DFAT Academic Focal Point for IORA to discuss preparations and arrangements with Indonesian officials for Ministerial and Senior Officials Meetings in Padang, Indonesia in October, which he will be attending as part of the Australian Government delegation. Dennis Rumley was invited to assist in constructing the agenda for the October 2015 meeting in which the leadership of IORAG was transferred from Australia to Indonesia.

Tim Doyle presented: ‘Academic Diplomacy and Region-Building.’ Presentation at the National Working Committee of The Indian Ocean Rim Academic Group (IORAG), Jakarta, Indonesia, 14 August 2015.

Dennis Rumley presented: ‘IORAG Reform and Futures’ Presentation at the National Working Committee of The Indian Ocean Rim Academic Group (IORAG), Jakarta, Indonesia, 14 August 2015.

2014

In 2014, the Australia-Asia-Pacific Institute organized a Conference on Indian Ocean Futures, attracting a wide range of scholars from around the world. The special edition, Proceedings from the Australia-Asia-Pacific Conference on Indian Ocean Futures 2014 was published in the June 2015 edition of the Journal of the Indian Ocean Region. This special edition covers a broad range of themes, including: green urbanism in the Indian Ocean Region; Sino-Chinese rivalry in the IOR; adaptation to climate change issues; maritime security off the coast of East Africa; and a cultural piece about cultural futures in the IOR.

Earlier

• International Conference on Indian Ocean Regionalism: Reinvigorating IOR-ARC. Jointly hosted by the Indian Council for World Affairs (ICWA) and IORG. 5–6 May 2011, New Delhi.

• Fourth Annual Conference of IORG on Marine Biodiversity and Fisheries in the Indian Ocean Region: Opportunities and Threats in Oman. 18 February to 20 February 2007

• Third Annual Conference of IORG in collaboration with the Maritime Institute of Malaysia (MIMA) in Kuala Lumpur, Malaysia. 12–14 July 2005

• International Conference on Energy Security in the Indian Ocean. February 15–16, 2004.

• The Indian Ocean in a Globalizing World: Critical Perspectives on the 21st century. 18–22 November 2002.

== Bibliography ==
Books

- Chaturvedi, S. and Doyle, T. (2015) Climate Terror: A Critical Geopolitics of Climate Change, New Securities Series, edited by Stuart Croft, Warwick University (Palgrave Macmillan: UK and New York).
- Doyle, R., McEachern, D., and MacGregor, S. (2015). Environment and Politics, fourth edition, London and New York: Routledge
- Doherty, B., and Doyle, T. (2014) Environmentalism, Resistance and Solidarity, Basingstoke: Palgrave Macmillan
- Doyle, T. and MacGregor, S. eds. (2014) Environmental Movements around the World, Santa Barbara: Praeger
- Doyle, T. and Riseley, eds. (2008) Crucible for Survival: Environmental Security and Justice in the Indian Ocean Region, New Jersey: Rutgers University Press
- Rumley, D., ed. (2013), The Indian Ocean Region: Security, Stability and Sustainability in the 21st Century, Melbourne: Australia India Institute, 126pp.
- Rumley, D., ed. (2015), The Political Economy of Indian Ocean Maritime Africa, New Delhi: Pentagon Press, 322 pp.
- Rumley, D. and Doyle, T. (2015) Indian Ocean Regionalisms, (eds) (Routledge: London).
- Rumley, D. and Chaturvedi S. (eds.) (2015) Geopolitical Orientations, Regionalism and Security in the Indian Ocean, London: Routledge (due in May 2015)
- Rumley, D. and Chaturvedi S. (eds.) (2015) Energy Security and the Indian Ocean Region, London: Routledge. (research theme 4)Rumley, D. and Chaturvedi, S., and Sakhuja, V., eds. (2009) Fisheries Exploitation in the Indian Ocean: Threats and Opportunities, Singapore: Institute of Southeast Asian Studies

Scholarly Book Chapters

- Doyle, T. and Rumley, D. (2015) 'Africa and contested constructions of the Indian Ocean Region', in Rumley, D., ed., The Political Economy of Indian Ocean Maritime Africa, New Delhi: Pentagon Press, pp. 91–100.
- Doyle, T. and Alfonsi, A. (2014) ‘Does an open-free market economy make Australia more or less secure in a globalised world?,’ in Issues in Australian Foreign Policy, edited by Daniel Baldino et al., Oxford University Press.
- Doyle, T. J. (2012) ‘Building Indian Ocean Regionalisms: Research Agendas for the Future’, The Future of the Indian Ocean Rim – Association for Regional Co-operation, ed. Vijay Sakuja, Indian Council of World Affairs, and Routledge, New Delhi.
- Doyle, T. And Chaturvedi, S. (2011) ‘Climate Refuges and Security: Conceptualizations, Categories and Contestations,’ in Dryzek, J., Norgaard, R., and Schlosberg, D., Oxford Handbook of Climate Change and Society, Oxford University Press: UK.
- Schofield, C.H. (2014), ‘Securing the World’s most Dangerous Strait?: The Bab al-Mandeb and Gulf of Aden’, pp. 268–298 in Oral, N. (ed.), Safety, Security and Environmental Protection in Straits Used in International
- Navigation: Is International Law Meeting the Challenge?, (Leiden/Boston: Martinus Nijhoff).
- Chaturvedi, S. “Rescaling Indian Ocean Regionalism in the Era of Climate Change: Perspectives on and from the Bay of Bengal”, in Vijay Sakhuja (ed.) Reinvigorating IOR-ARC, New Delhi: Pentagon Press, 2011.
- Jayasuriya K (2013) Regulatory State with Dirigiste Characteristics: Variegated Pathways of Regulatory Governance. In N. Dubash and B. Morgan (eds), The Rise of the Regulatory state of the Global South. Oxford: Oxford University Press.

Refereed Journal Articles

- Doyle, T. and Seal, G. (2015) ‘Indian Ocean Futures: New Partnerships, Alliances, and Academic Diplomacy,’ in Journal of the Indian Ocean Region, vol. 11, no. 1, June.
- Doyle, T. (2014) ‘The Coming Together of Geoeconomics and Geosecurities in The Indian Ocean Region? Journal of the Indian Ocean Region Vol. 10, no. 2 December.
- Doyle, T. (2013) ‘Africa and the Indian Ocean Region,’ Journal of the Indian Ocean Region, vol 9, issue 2, 131-133.
- Rumley, D, Doyle, T. J. and Chaturvedi, S (2012) ‘Securing the Indian Ocean? Competing Regional Security Constructions’, Journal of the Indian Ocean Region, vol. 8, issue 1, June.
- Ryan, B.J. (2013) ‘Zones and Routes: Securing a Western Indian Ocean,’ Journal of the Indian Ocean Pacific Region, 9 (2): 173-188.
- Ryan, B.J. (2013) ‘Reasonable Force: The Emergence of Global Policing Power,’ Review of International Studies, 39 (2): 435-457.
- Schofield, C.H. (2014) ‘Arming Merchant Vessels: Enhancing or Imperilling Maritime Safety and Security’, Korean Journal of International and Comparative Law, Vol.2, no.1: 46-66.
- Schofield, C.H., Telesetsky, A. and Lee, S. (2013) A Tribunal Navigating Complex Waters Implications of the Bay of Bengal Case, in Ocean Development and International Law, Vol.44, no.4: 363-388.
- Schofield, C.H. and Telesetsky, A. (2012) Grey Clouds or Clearer Skies Ahead? Implications of the Bay of Bengal Case, in American Society of International Law, Law of the Sea Reports, Vol.III (2012), no.1.
- Lin, S. and Schofield C.H. (2014) Lessons from the Bay of Bengal ITLOS Case: Stepping Offshore for a “Deeper” Maritime Political Geography’, Commentary, in The Geographical Journal, Vol.180, no.3 (September): 260-264.
- Chaturvedi, S. and Doyle, T, “Geopolitics of Fear and the Emergence of ‘Climate Refugees’: Imaginative Geographies of Climate Change and Displacements in Bangladesh’, in Journal of the Indian Ocean Region, 6(2), 2011: 206-222. (Co-authored with Timothy Doyle)
