= WAY 79 =

Sesquicentenary of state of Western Australia

The WAY 1979 logo

WAY 79, also referred to as WAY '79 and WAY 1979, was the official 1979 sesquicentennial (150th anniversary) celebration of the European colonisation of Western Australia.

== Planning ==
Preliminary planning for WAY 79 began shortly after the March 1971 celebrations of Western Australia's population passing one million. The success of this celebration prompted the Perth Chamber of Commerce to begin planning for Western Australia's sesquicentenary. Planning proceeded slowly at first, and it was not until January 1974 that the Government of Western Australia became involved.

When Charles Court became the premier of Western Australia in April of that year, the government took over planning, and preparations began in earnest. The following year the WAY 79 concept was officially launched by the premier. S. W. Dallymore was initially appointed executive officer for the celebrations, but he resigned after two years, and Slade Drake-Brockman was appointed in his place. According to historian Geoffrey Bolton in 1989, "It would be fair to assume that Court and Drake-Brockman played the most significant roles in determining the character of WAY 1979."

== Events ==
The first WAY 79 event was a New Year's Eve concert on the Perth Esplanade, attended by about 60,000 people. Performers included Rolf Harris, Fat Cat and Percy Penguin.

Ken Colbung had been invited to perform on the didgeridoo; the Indigenous activist used the occasion to hand an eviction notice to the Governor of Western Australia, Wallace Kyle. Colbung claimed to be serving the notice on the white people on behalf of Western Australia's Aboriginal people. The notice was pointedly in the same form as that used by the State Housing Commission for eviction notices to Aboriginal tenants. The act was intended both as a reminder of Aboriginal land rights and dispossession, and a reference to the contemporary plight of the state's indigenous people. Court was furious at the event, calling it "a cheap and ill-conceived stunt".

One of the major events held in Perth under the patronage of WAY 79 was the Miss Universe 1979 pageant. Maritza Sayalero of Venezuela won the pageant; as numerous press people crowded close to photograph her, the catwalk collapsed. Eight contestants and two media representatives were plunged to the ground, but there were no major injuries.

In March Prince Charles made a state visit, representing The Crown. Among his many engagements was officially opening the Avondale Agricultural Research Station Museum by planting a tree near the entrance. His other tree planting activity occurred at Government House. He also followed the steps of the founders from the Swan River into what is now the city.

In August 1979, the first of two international conferences on the Indian Ocean region was held in Perth as the International Conference on Indian Ocean Studies; the second was held in 1984.

Competitors in the Parmelia Yacht Race from Plymouth to Fremantle arrived in late November.

== Mementos ==
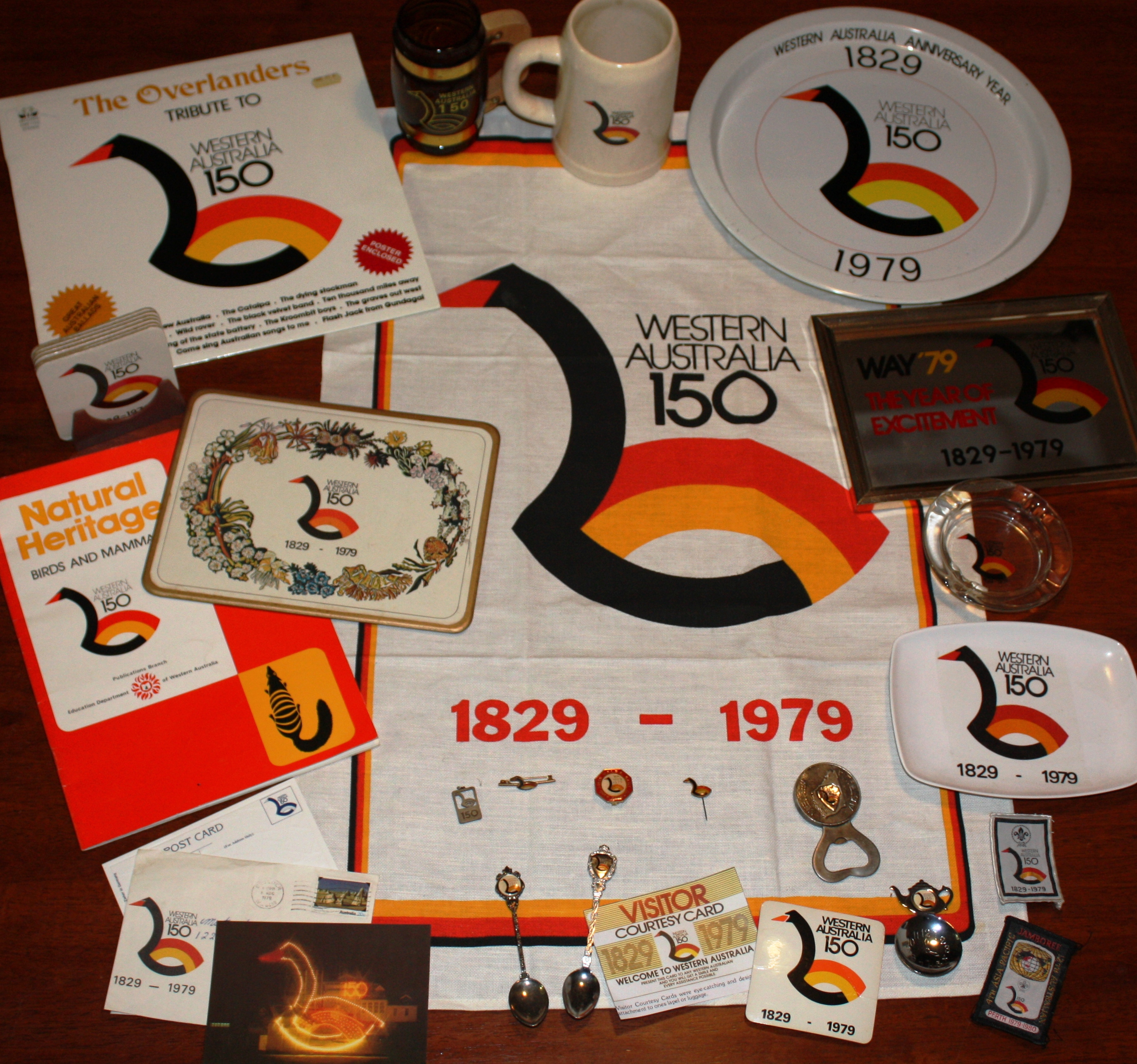
Some of the range of memorabilia issued as part of the WAY'79 celebrations

Numerous other events were staged under the WAY 79 banner, from yacht races to family reunions and street parties. The government issued a commemorative twenty-cent postage stamp. Both official and commercial merchandise was produced to mark the occasion, from books to tea-towels.

The iconic WAY 79 logo was designed by Norm Wilson, an art director and partner at Marketforce advertising agency.

Some have noted the celebrations focused on its perpetuation of the "pioneer myth", which "saw progress in terms of mineral development rather than social justice or environmental amenity".

In 1989 Bolton wrote that the WAY 79 celebrations:

offered a sanitised version of the past.... Nobody tried to replicate the heat, the insects, the dysentery, the alcoholism, the boredom and the discomfort which were so intimate a part of daily life in the Swan River Colony.

== Publications ==
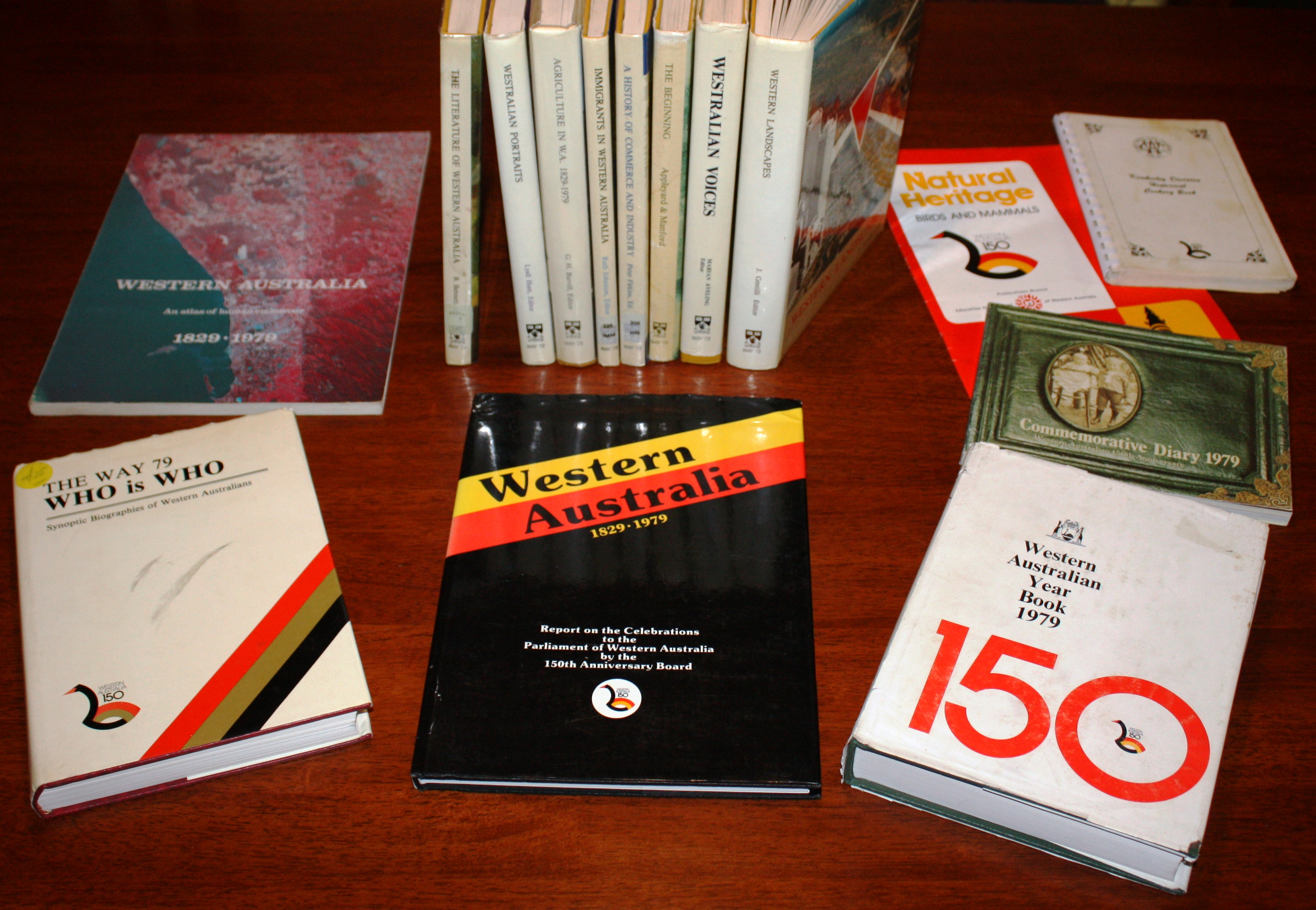
Some of the books published as part of the celebrations

Among the books published was the WAY 79 Sesquicentenary Celebrations Series, 14 volumes on a range of Western Australian topics.

=== List of titles ===
- Berndt, Ronald M. and Catherine H. Berndt (eds) (1979). Aborigines of the West: Their Past and their Present. Nedlands: University of Western Australia Press for the Education Committee of the 150th Anniversary Celebrations. ISBN 0-85564-145-2. (This book went to a second edition)
- Burvill, G.H. (ed.) (1979). Agriculture in Western Australia: 150 years of Development and Achievement, 1829-1979. Nedlands: University of Western Australia Press for the Education Committee of the 150th Anniversary Celebrations. ISBN 0-85564-154-1.
- Appleyard, Reginald Toby and Toby Manford (1979). The Beginning : European Discovery and Early Settlement of Swan River, Western Australia. Nedlands: University of Western Australia Press for the Education Committee of the 150th Anniversary Celebrations. ISBN 0-85564-146-0.
- Neal, W. D. (ed.) (1979). Education in Western Australia. Nedlands: University of Western Australia Press for the Education Committee of the 150th Anniversary Celebrations. ISBN 0-85564-147-9.
- Brian J. O'Brien (ed.) (1979). Environment and Science. Nedlands: University of Western Australia Press for the Education Committee of the 150th Anniversary Celebrations. ISBN 0-85564-148-7.
- Firkins, Peter (ed.) (1979). A History of Commerce and Industry in Western Australia. Nedlands: University of Western Australia Press for the Education Committee of the 150th Anniversary Celebrations. ISBN 0-85564-150-9.
- Johnston, Ruth (1979). Immigrants in Western Australia. Nedlands: University of Western Australia Press. ISBN 0-85564-151-7.
- Bennett, Bruce (ed.) (1979). The Literature of Western Australia. Nedlands: University of Western Australia Press for the Education Committee of the 150th Anniversary Celebrations. ISBN 0-85564-152-5.
- Prider, Rex T. (1979). Mining in Western Australia. Nedlands: University of Western Australia Press for the Education Committee of the 150th Anniversary Celebrations. ISBN 0-85564-153-3.
- Pitt Morison, Margaret; White, John Graham, eds. (1979). Western Towns and Buildings. Nedlands: University of Western Australia Press for the Education Committee of the 150th Anniversary Celebrations. ISBN 0-85564-156-8.
- Gentilli, J., ed. (1979). Western Landscapes. Nedlands: University of Western Australia Press for the Education Committee of the 150th Anniversary Celebrations. ISBN 0-85564-155-X.
- Hunt, Lyall (ed.) (1979). Westralian Portraits. Nedlands: University of Western Australia Press for the Education Committee of the 150th Anniversary Celebrations. ISBN 0-85564-157-6.
- Russell, Enid (1979). Robinson, F.M.; Nichols, P.W. (eds.). A history of the law in Western Australia and its development from 1829-1979. Nedlands: University of Western Australia Press for the Education Committee of the 150th Anniversary Celebrations. ISBN 0-85564-171-1.

The Women's Committee for the 150th Anniversary Celebrations produced the volume Reflections; Profiles of 150 Women who Helped Make Western Australian History. The West Australian contributed Swan River Colony – 96 pages of images selected from its newspaper archives. The Education Department produced Western Australia: An atlas of human endeavour to provide schools with an up-to-date list of achievements by the state and its people, with graphics and accurate maps.

An editorial panel, all connected with the University of Western Australia, released a 437-page Who is Who, in which the candid aim was "to change as little as possible what people wrote about themselves". The result was an engaging compendium of academic and political networks of the day; it omitted such eminent persons as Rolf Harris, Sir Paul Hasluck, Sir Laurence Brodie-Hall, Kim Beazley Jr, Sir Norman Brearley, building magnate John Roberts and champion Australian rules footballer Bill Walker.

Parliament was provided with a report of the events of the year. The various committees formed did produce ephemeral material – such as the list from the Commerce Committee of the names of those plaques on St Georges Terrace and the Premier's Department and the Anniversary Board arranged for the New Year proceedings to be kept on record.

=== Western Australia: An atlas of human endeavour ===
Western Australia: An atlas of human endeavour is an atlas that was published by the Western Australian Department of Education and the Department of Lands and Surveys, and distributed to all school children in WA. It has a foreword by Premier Charles Court, who was personally involved in a number of the projects that were conducted by the organisation.

Rather than being simply a collection of maps, like a traditional atlas, the atlas of human endeavour presents descriptive text and photographs illustrating the changes over time since the initial European settlement, in four broad categories:

- Landscapes
- Discovery, exploration and settlement
- Economy
- Social patterns and processes

It includes extensive usage of historical geography, such as historical maps and photographs, for comparison with those of the contemporary landscape:

The maps, photographs and text in this atlas present a story of discovery, exploration and economic and social development.

— Charles Court, Premier of Western Australia

The front and rear covers of the book are false colour images created by processing satellite imagery from Landsat 1 and 2. The front image extends from Rockingham to Lancelin, the rear image from Mandurah to Yallingup. The colours in the images indicate human artefacts such as ploughed land, mining activity, bitumen and concrete, as well as the varying of vegetation.

The atlas includes gazetteers and bibliographies - at some divergence from the Sesquicentenary Celebrations Series editions that lacked indexes and adequate reference materials.

It was originally published for the 1979 celebrations, and included "1829 • 1979" as part of the title; a second edition was published in 1986, without the years in the title.

== St Georges Terrace plaques ==
One hundred and fifty commemorative plaques were installed along St Georges Terrace, Perth honouring notable figures in Western Australia's history. Since then, more plaques have been added and, as of August 2014, the years to 1999 were included. In July 2014, the 1959 plaque of Rolf Harris was removed by the City of Perth following his conviction in the UK on charges of indecent assault.

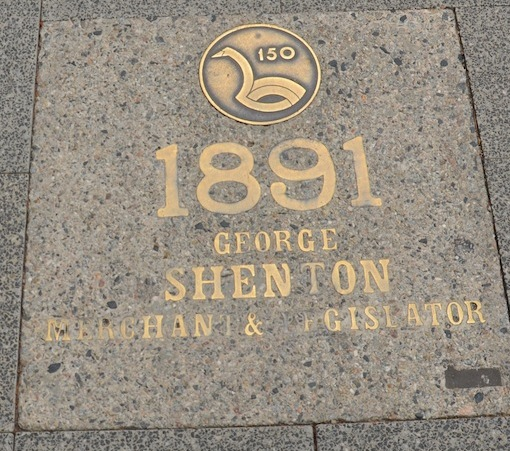
1891 - George Shenton

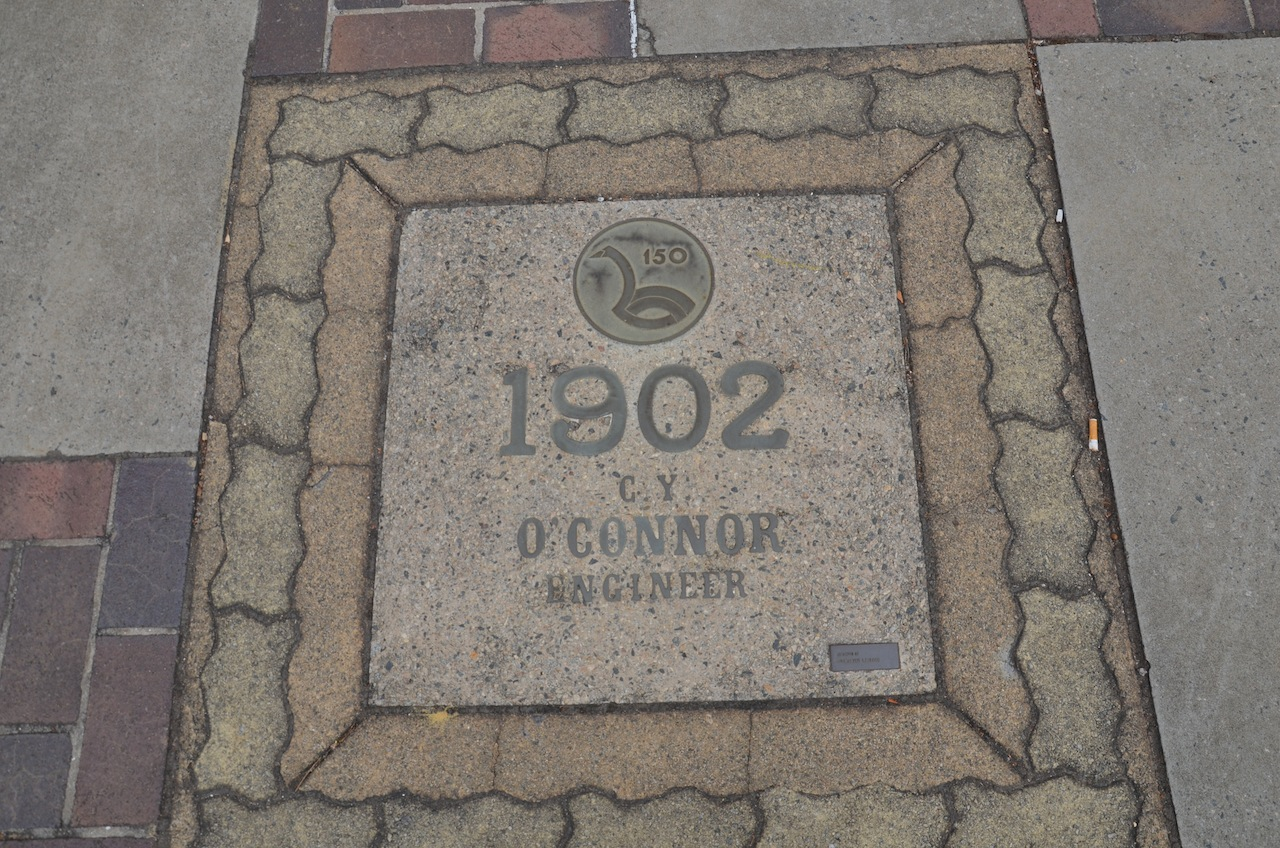
1902 - C. Y. O'Connor

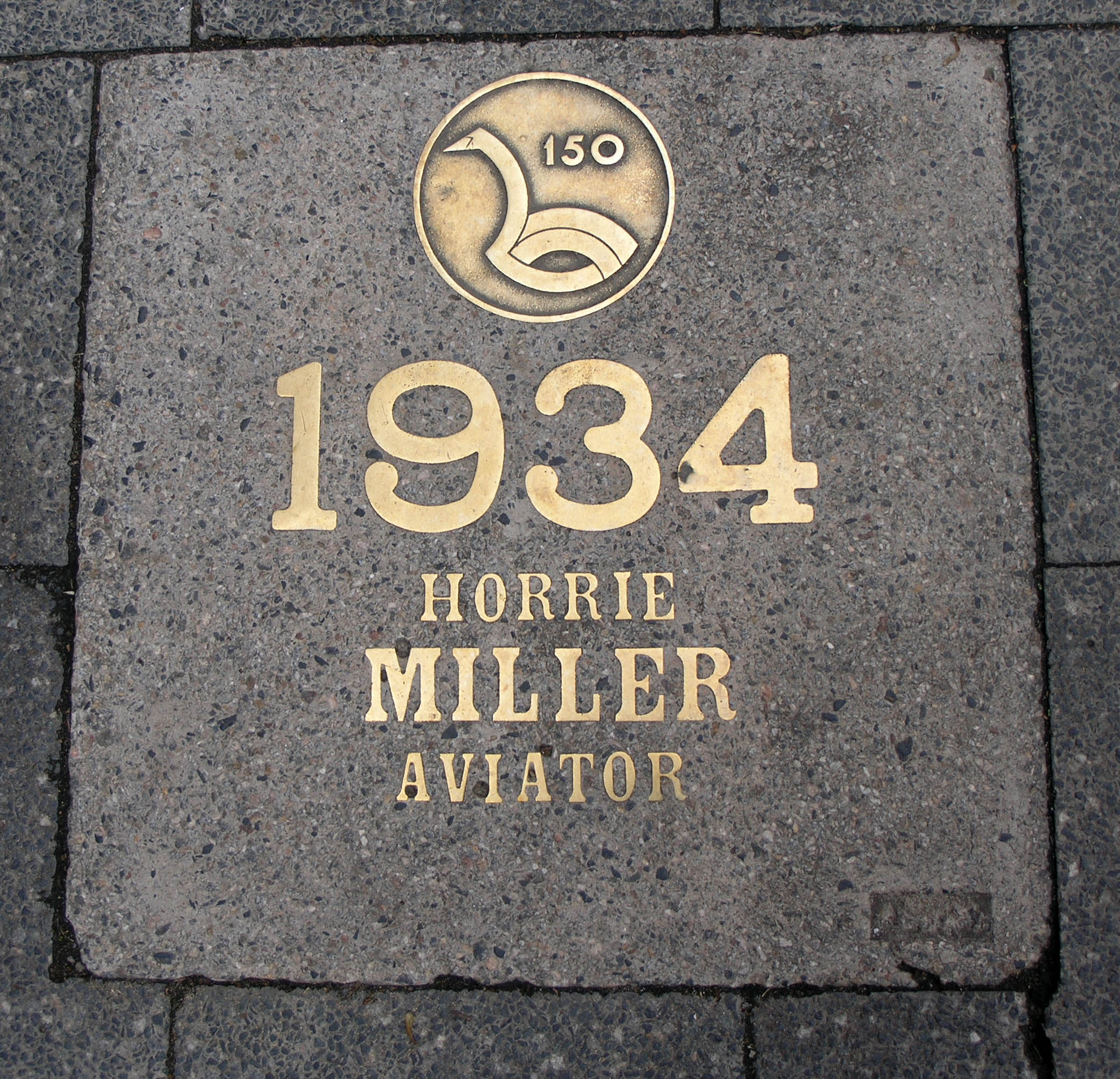
1934 – Horrie Miller

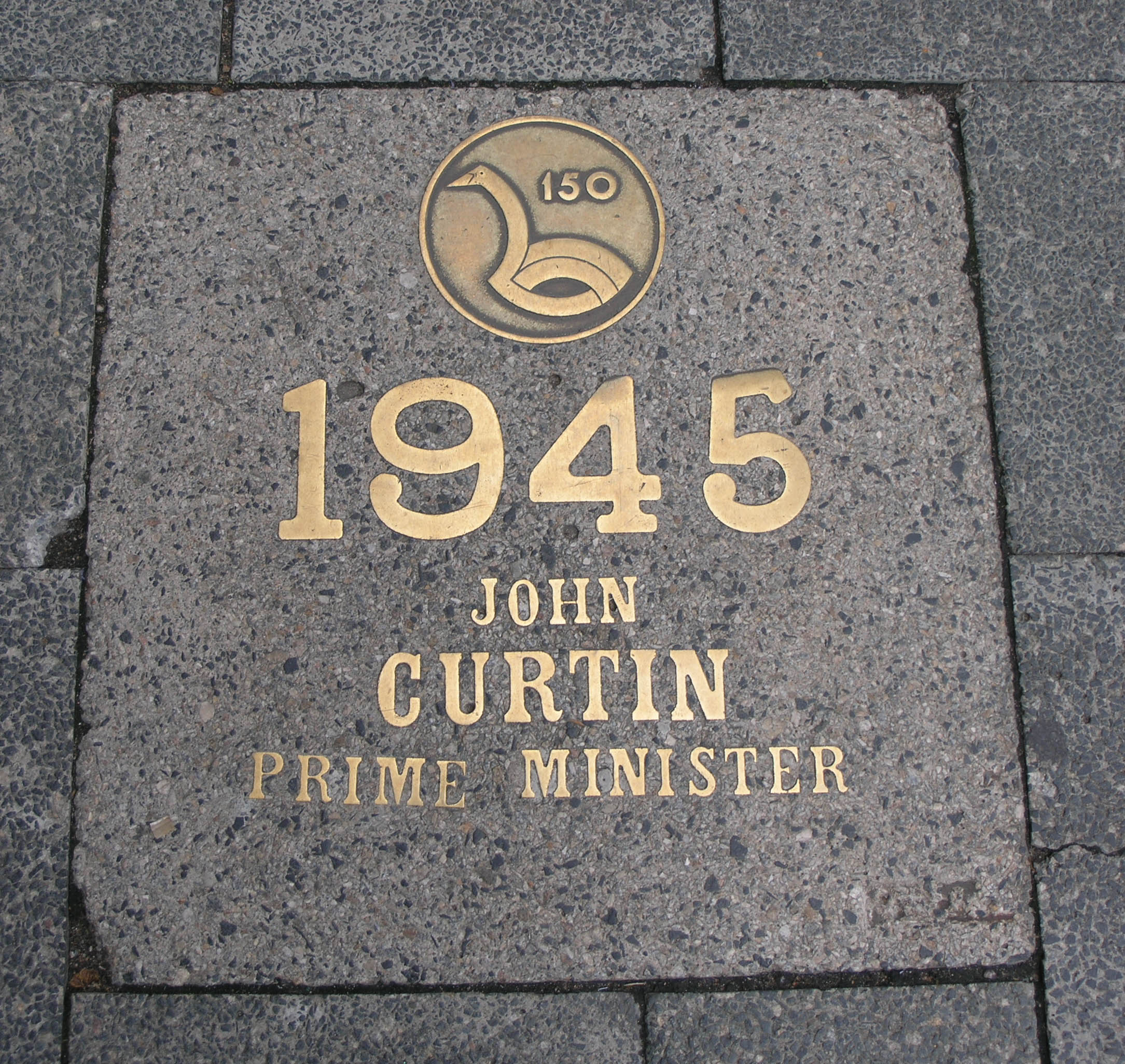
1945 – John Curtin

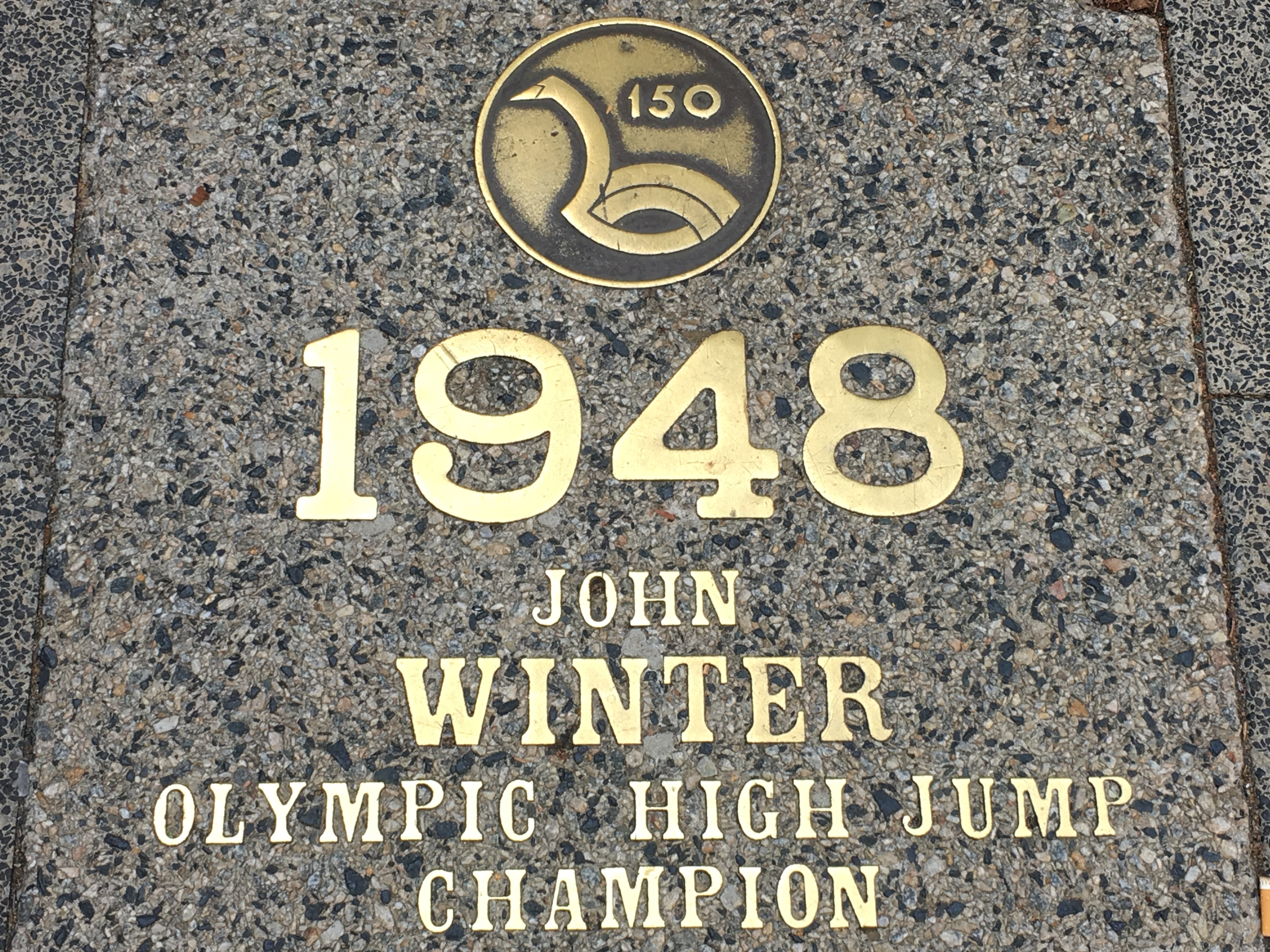
1948 - John Winter

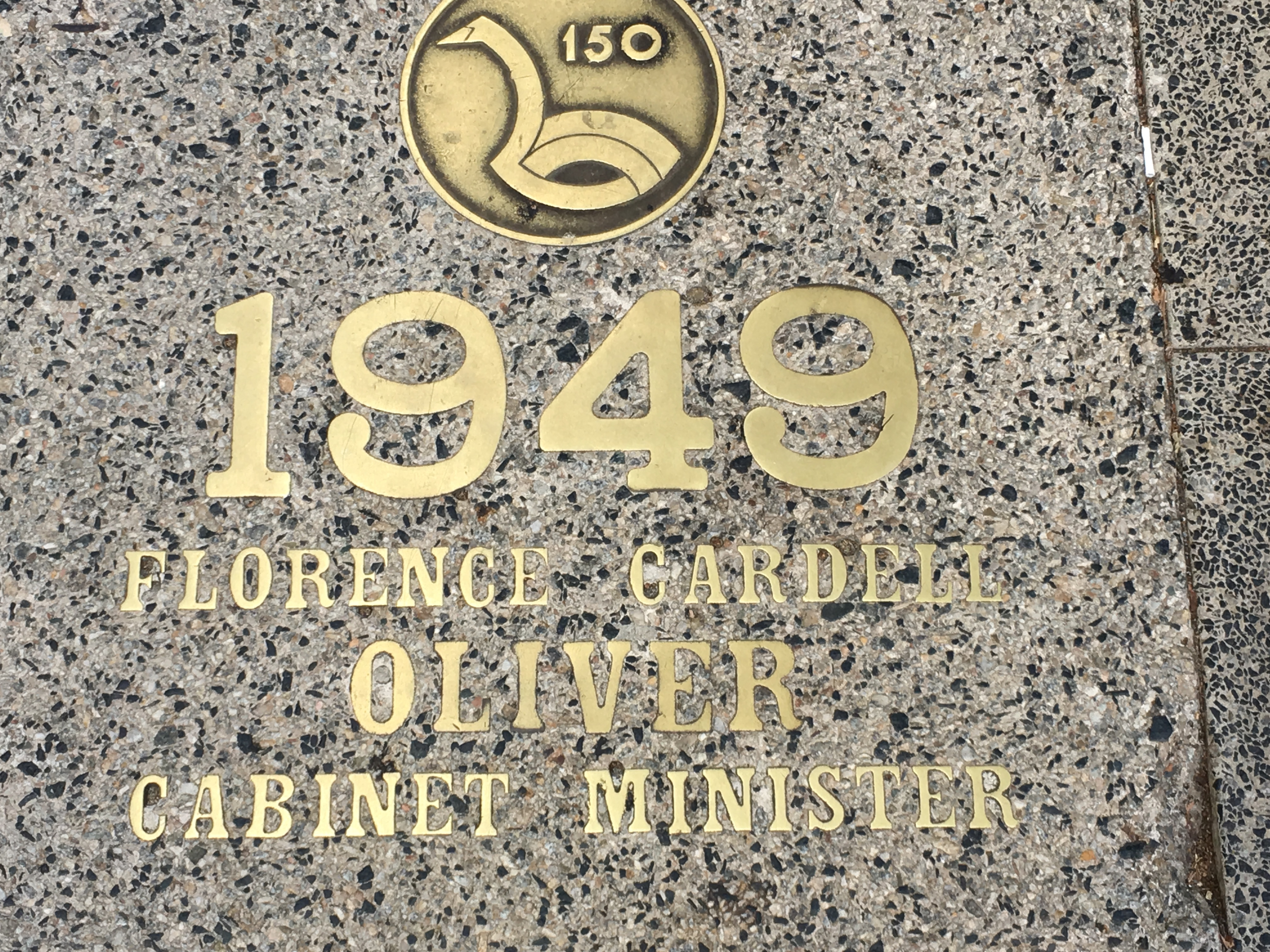
1949 - Florence Cardell-Oliver

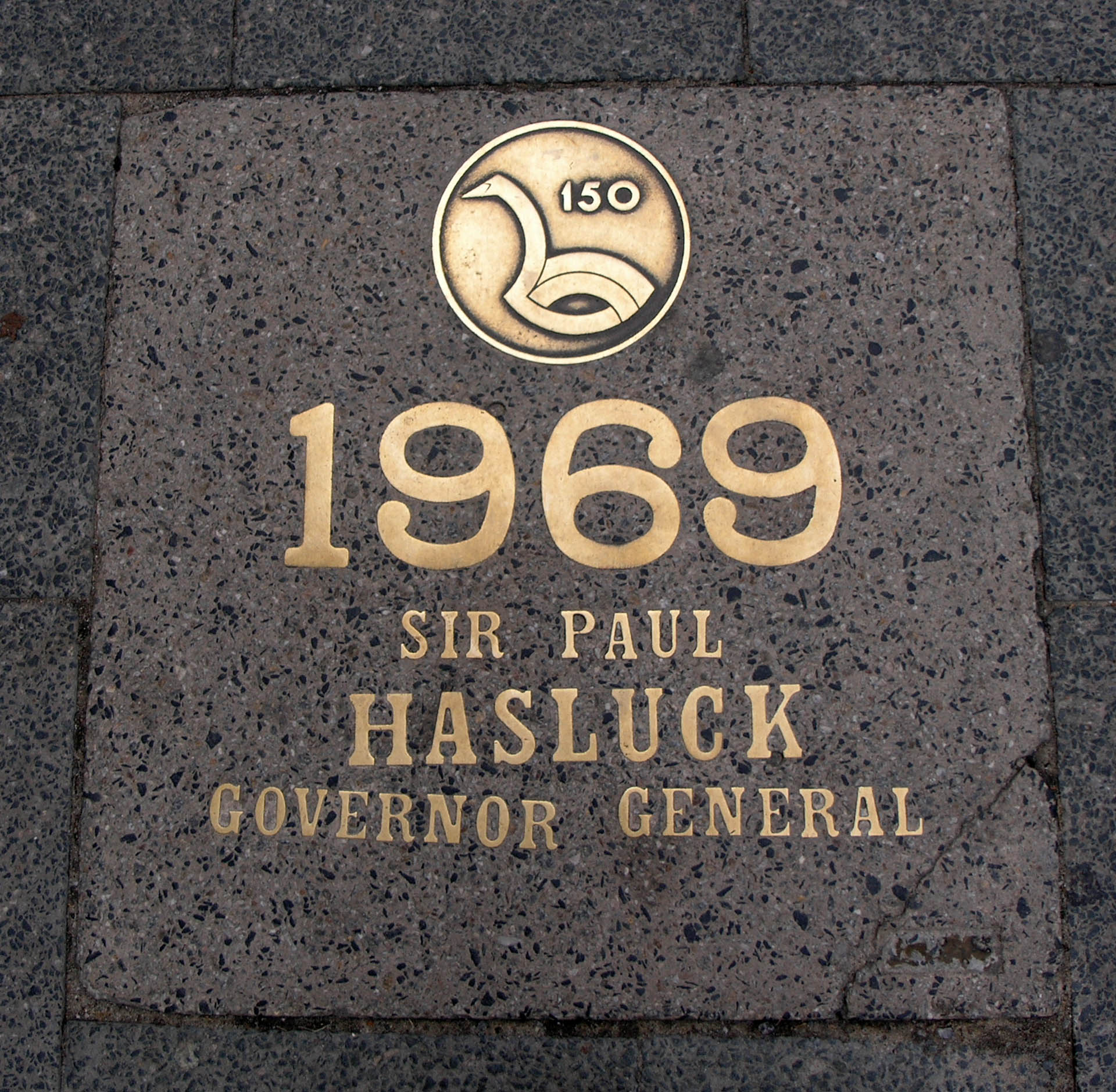
1969 – Paul Hasluck

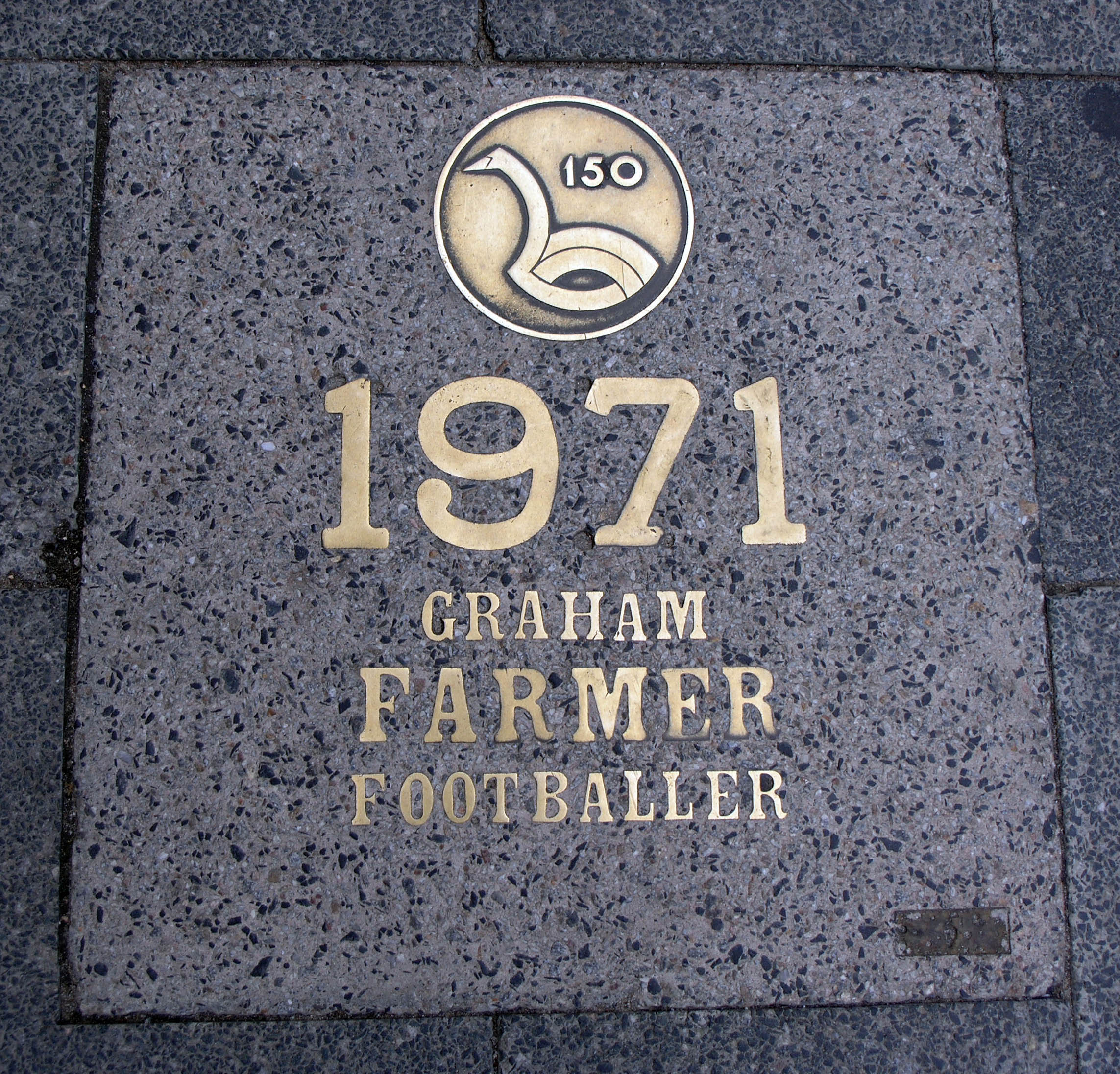
1971 – Graham Farmer

== See also ==
- Centenary of Western Australia
- Western Australian 175th Anniversary
