= List of diplomatic missions in the Comoros =

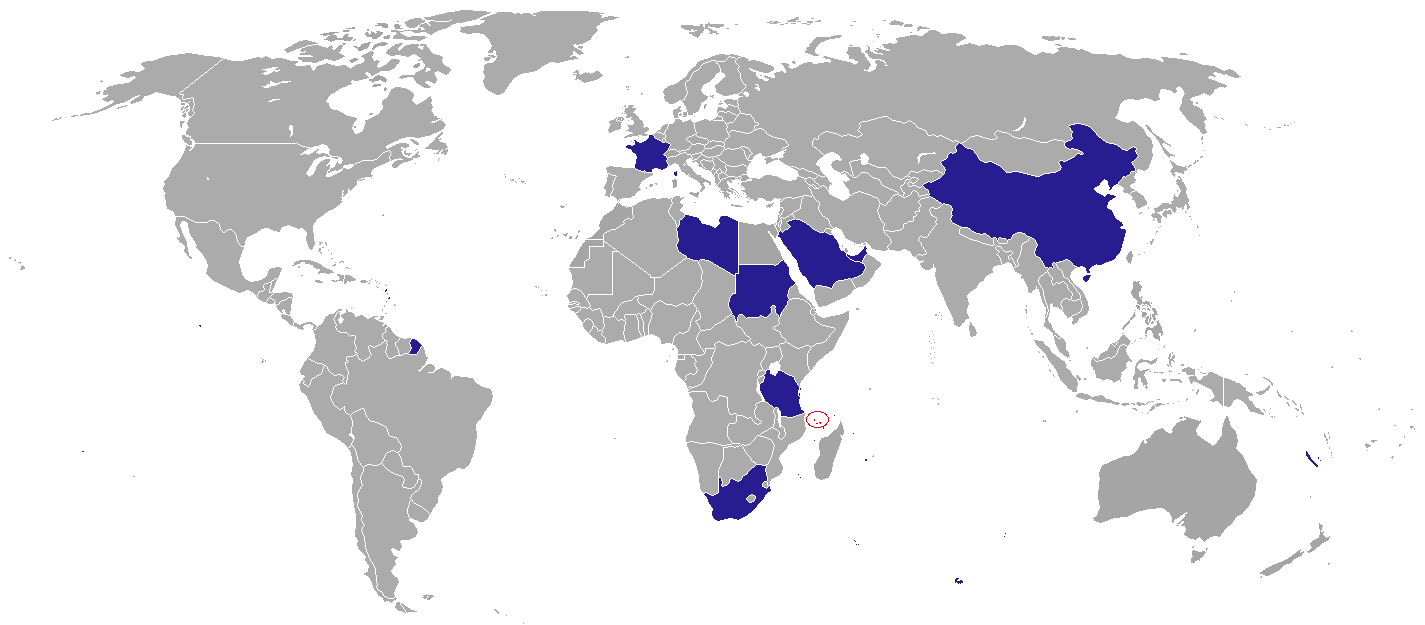
Map of diplomatic missions in Comoros

This article lists diplomatic missions resident in the Comoros. At present, the capital city of Moroni hosts 7 embassies. Several other countries accredit ambassadors from other capitals.

== Embassies ==
=== Moroni ===
1. China
2. France
3. Libya
4. Saudi Arabia
5. South Africa
6. Tanzania
7. United Arab Emirates

=== Other delegations or missions ===
- European Union (Representative Office)

== Consulates ==
=== Mutsamudu ===
- France (Consulate)

=== Fomboni ===
- France (Consulate)

== Non-resident embassies accredited to the Comoros ==
=== Resident in Antananarivo, Madagascar ===
- Algeria
- Germany
- India
- Indonesia
- Japan
- Russia
- Switzerland
- Turkey
- United States

=== Resident in Dar es Salaam, Tanzania ===
- Angola
- Brazil
- Canada
- Cuba
- Denmark
- Egypt
- Finland
- Ireland
- Italy
- Netherlands
- Nigeria
- Norway
- Somalia

=== Resident in Nairobi, Kenya ===
- Argentina
- Austria
- Belgium
- Greece
- Mexico
- Philippines
- Poland
- Slovakia
- South Korea
- Sweden
- Thailand
- Ukraine

=== Resident in Port Louis, Mauritius ===
- Australia
- Bangladesh
- United Kingdom

=== Resident in Pretoria, South Africa ===
- Bulgaria
- Burkina Faso
- Cameroon
- Croatia
- Colombia
- Cyprus
- Mali
- Portugal
- Romania
- Seychelles
- Spain

=== Resident in other cities ===
- Czech Republic (Addis Ababa)
- Equatorial Guinea (Maputo)
- Ghana (Harare)
- Kazakhstan (Addis Ababa)
- Palestine (Djibouti City)
- Senegal (Kigali)
- Serbia (New York City)
- Tunisia (Addis Ababa)

== Closed embassies ==
- Iran
- Madagascar
- Qatar
- Sudan

== See also ==
- Foreign relations of Comoros
