= Comoros–France relations =

- Comoros: France

Diplomatic mission
- Embassy of Comoros, Paris: Embassy of France, Moroni

Comoros–France relations are the bilateral relations between the Union of the Comoros and the French Republic.

The Comoros has an embassy in Paris and France has an embassy in the Comorian capital Moroni.

Comoros lays claim to Mayotte, an overseas department and region of France, in the western Indian Ocean.

The Comoros and France share a maritime border via the French Southern and Antarctic Lands.

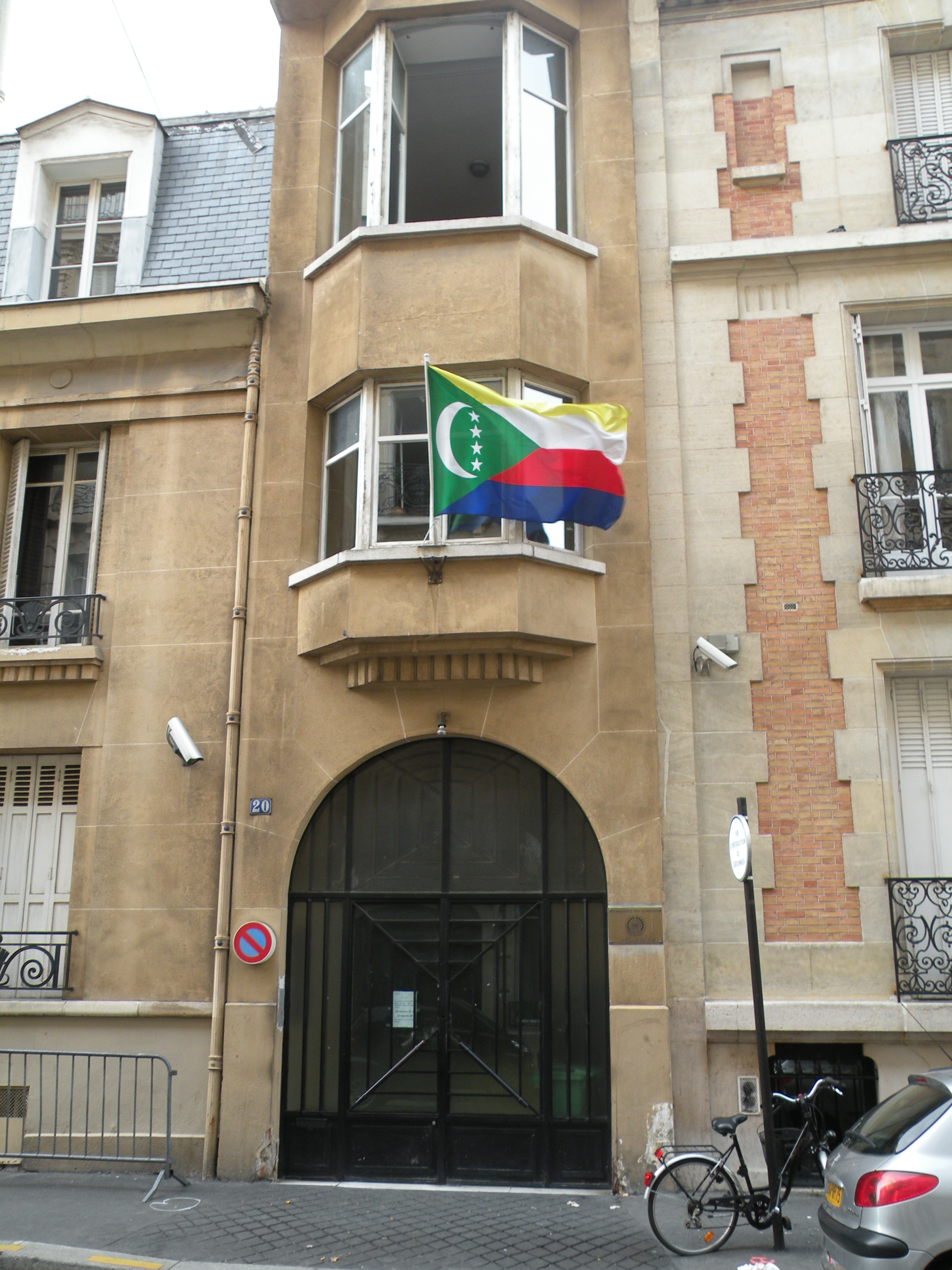
Comorian embassy in Paris.

== History ==
At the end of December 1975, in France, an appeal to the Constitutional Council upheld the law and the right of the population to self-determination, remaining French in this case. This interpretation allowed Mayotte to remain French. The arguments used were, on the one hand, that colonization took place in several phases, for example, the island of Mayotte being annexed to Madagascar before the other three islands of the archipelago were annexed. Since the boundaries of the Colony therefore depend on the date, the Comoros as an entity were only established by the French administration in 1946. Furthermore, Mayotte did not wish to become independent. Consequently, France did not consider itself obliged, as the Comoros demanded using the argument of international law, to grant independence to the islands collectively. This decision also implied that another referendum must be held in Mayotte. France recognized the Comoros in December 1975, but held a referendum in Mayotte on February 8, 1976, during which the inhabitants of Mayotte overwhelmingly declared themselves in favor of remaining part of the French Republic. On February 6, 1976, France used its veto power in the United Nations Security Council to prevent the adoption of a draft resolution calling on it to enter into negotiations with the Comorian government with a view to the return of Mayotte and to renounce the holding of a new referendum.

== See also ==
- Foreign relations of the Comoros
- Foreign relations of France
