= Indian Ocean Rim Association =

International organization

- Logo

- IORA members Dialogue partners
- Headquarters: Ebene, Mauritius
- Working languages: English
- Type: Intergovernmental
- Membership: 23 members: Australia; Bangladesh; Comoros; France; India; Indonesia; Iran; Kenya; Madagascar; Malaysia; Maldives; Mauritius; Mozambique; Oman; Seychelles; Singapore; Somalia; South Africa; Sri Lanka; Tanzania; Thailand; United Arab Emirates; Yemen; 12 dialogue partners: China; Egypt; European Union; Germany; Italy; Japan; Russia; Saudi Arabia; South Korea; Turkey; United Kingdom; United States

Leaders
  - Secretary General: Sanjiv Ranjan, Secretary General
  - Chair: India
  - Vice Chair: None Appointed (as of November, 2025)

Establishment
  - 6 March 1997: Indian Ocean Rim Association for Regional Co-operation
- Time zone: UTC+2 to +10.5
- Website www.iora.int/en

The Indian Ocean Rim Association (IORA), formerly known as the Indian Ocean Rim Initiative (IORI) and the Indian Ocean Rim Association for Regional Cooperation (IOR-ARC), is an international organisation consisting of 23 states bordering the Indian Ocean. The IORA is a regional forum, tripartite in nature, bringing together representatives of Government, Business and Academia, for promoting co-operation and closer interaction among them. It is based on the principles of for strengthening Economic Cooperation particularly on Trade Facilitation and Investment, Promotion as well as Social Development of the region. The Coordinating Secretariat of IORA is located at Ebene, Mauritius.

== Overview ==
The organisation was first established as Indian Ocean Rim Initiative in Mauritius in March 1995 and formally launched on 6–7 March 1997 by the conclusion of a multilateral treaty known as the Charter of the Indian Ocean Rim Association for Regional Co-operation. The idea is said to have taken root during a visit of former South African Foreign Minister, Pik Botha, to India in November 1993. It was cemented during the subsequent presidential visit of Nelson Mandela to India in January 1995. Consequently, an Indian Ocean Rim Initiative was formed by South Africa and India. Mauritius and Australia were subsequently brought in. In March 1997, the IOR-ARC was formally launched, with seven additional countries as members: Indonesia, Sri Lanka, Malaysia, Yemen, Tanzania, Madagascar and Mozambique.

The apex body of the IOR-ARC is the Council of (Foreign) Ministers (COM). The meeting of the COM is preceded by the meetings of the Indian Ocean Rim Academic Group (IORAG), Indian Ocean Rim Business Forum (IORBF), Working Group on Trade and Investment (WGTI), and the Committee of Senior Officials (CSO).

=== Objectives & Priority Areas of Cooperation ===
The objectives of IORA are as follows:

1. To promote sustainable growth and balanced development of the region and member states
2. To focus on those areas of economic cooperation which provide maximum opportunities for development, shared interest and mutual benefits
3. To promote liberalisation, remove impediments and lower barriers towards a freer and enhanced flow of goods, services, investment, and technology within the Indian Ocean rim.

Indian Ocean Rim Association (IORA) has identified six priority areas, namely:

1. maritime security,
2. trade and investment facilitation,
3. fisheries management,
4. disaster risk reduction,
5. academic and scientific cooperation and
6. tourism promotion and cultural exchanges.

In addition to these, two focus areas are also identified by IORA, namely blue economy and women's economic empowerment.

IORA members undertake projects for economic co-operation relating to trade facilitation and liberalisation, promotion of foreign investment, scientific and technological exchanges, tourism, movement of natural persons and service providers on a non-discriminatory basis; and the development of infrastructure and human resources, poverty alleviation, promotion of maritime transport and related matters, cooperation in the fields of fisheries trade, research and management, aquaculture, education and training, energy, IT, health, protection of the environment, agriculture, disaster management.

== Priority Areas ==
Beginning with India's acting as IORA Chair from 2011 to 2013, IORA has divided its maritime cooperation strategy into six priority areas and two focus areas in an attempt to strengthen the organization's institutions and capacities.

=== Maritime Safety and Security ===
IORA considers itself the "first line of defence" to build upon existing maritime security measures in the region. Maritime security is generally accepted to include a wide array of issues, ranging from the marine environment to human security; IORA does not stray from this broad definition, noting the importance of both traditional security threats and nontraditional threats such as environmental health and IUU fishing. In addition, IORA includes a "maritime safety" initiative that is concerned with training, transport, equipment related issues, and assistance in distress situations.

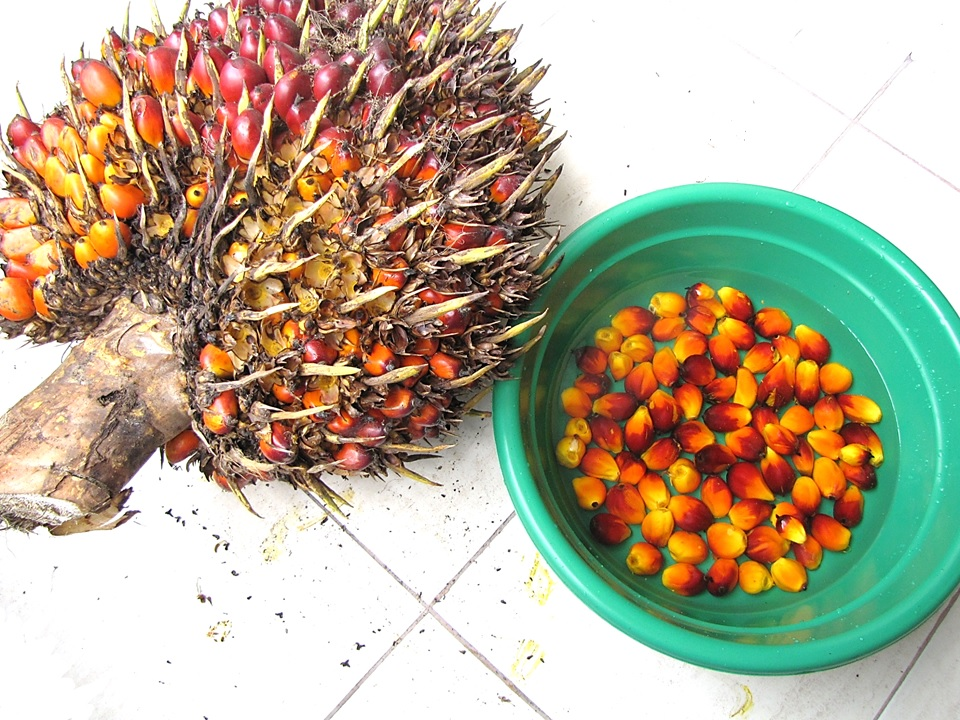
Iora Member Indonesia Palm oil exports reach 27 Bn Dollars in 2023 with farming palm oil for global export

=== Trade & Investment Facilitation ===
Recognizing the importance of the Indian Ocean Region in global trade, IORA has prioritized trade liberalisation and the freer flow of goods, services, investment, and technology; its "Action Plan 2017-2021" put forward the seven targets for trade in the region, ranging from reducing barriers to trade in the short term to making business travel easier in the long term.

=== Fisheries Management ===
Though included under the umbrella "Maritime Safety and Security" priority area, fisheries management proved itself to be an especially salient issue for IORA member states, warranting its inclusion as the organization's third highest priority. Through the Fisheries Support Unit (FSU) Flagship Project, IORA intends to promote sustainable conservation and the Blue Economy by reducing exploitation of fish stocks and promoting safe and responsible seafood trade.

=== Disaster Risk Management ===
The Indian Ocean Region is prone to disasters both natural and man-made, such as cyclones, droughts, earthquakes, tsunamis, floods, and tidal surges; and oil spills, fires, leakage of poisonous substances, and illegal dumping, respectively. IORA's Disaster Risk Management revolves around the development of knowledge and capabilities to anticipate, respond to, and recover from disasters. IORA's Disaster Risk Management Plan is multidisciplinary, involving national governments, non-governmental organizations, regional and international partners, and the private sector, among others.

=== Tourism and Cultural Exchanges ===
IORA promotes tourism and cultural exchanges through policy proposals for cooperation among member states and dialogue partners in order to promote regional economic growth, encourage the sustainable development of eco-tourism, and promote cultural heritage and "harnessing the economic potential of this heritage."

=== Academic, Science & Technology ===
IORA promotes the cooperation of centers of excellence in the Indian Ocean Region, citing the potential academia has to enhance IORA's knowledge on issues relating to marine conservation.

== Notable Advances & Achievements ==
=== Expansion ===
==== Membership Expansion ====
The initial membership of IORA, then the Indian Ocean Rim Initiative, included only seven countries, the "Magnificent 7," hosted by Mauritius. Though membership grew to 14 states in March 1997, when the first ministerial meeting was convened and the Charter of the Indian Ocean Rim Association for Regional Cooperation was approved, it has since grown to include 23 states and 10 dialogue partners. China obtained dialogue partner status in 2001. Significantly, the organization can now be said to truly comprise the Indian Ocean Region, and the involvement of great powers as dialogue partners has greatly expanded IORA's influence.

==== Expansion of Scope ====
Though initially focused solely on economic and trade cooperation, IORA has expanded its scope to include broader maritime security objectives, most notably a focus on non-traditional security threats, which are of growing importance in the maritime realm as a whole.

=== Blue Economy ===
A "Focus Area" of IORA, the Blue Economy gained the attention of all IORA member states at the 14th IORA Ministerial Meeting in 2014 due to its potential for promoting employment, food security, and poverty alleviation, while promoting business models and the economies of member states both large and small. Led by Australia and India, two member states with well-defined plans for engaging in the Blue Economy, a formation of a Blue Economy policy for member states has been relatively well-organized: platforms for cooperation on eco-tourism; the creation of the Indian Ocean Tuna Commission, which regulates fishing in the Indian Ocean; the research and development of marine and bio-resources for medicinal purposes; and economic investment are some examples of the successful implementation of Blue Economy proposals through IORA.

== Challenges ==
Though broad in membership and advancing in organizational integrity, IORA faces several obstacles that prevent it from growing into a highly successful and influential regional organization; these issues range from structural deficiencies to geopolitical conflicts existing outside IORA that permeate the organization and prevent cooperation.

=== Diverse States, Diverse Objectives ===
Though IORA's large membership affords it with the ability to understand perspectives of a wide array of nations in the Indian Ocean Region, it also creates differences in objectives, in what successful maritime security cooperation would look like, among member states.

Economically and developmentally, IORA brings together some of the world's richest countries - the United Arab Emirates, Singapore, and Australia - with some of the poorest, such as Mozambique, and island nations with very low GDPs, such as Seychelles; this creates uneven benefits from participation in IORA projects and can lead to economic competition and resentment among member states.

=== Overlapping Regional Organizations ===
IORA faces competition with other regional and international organizations for member states' attention and investments; in fact, 14 such bodies have IORA member states in their membership.

=== Geopolitical Disputes ===
Interstate conflicts have greatly hindered the strengthening of IORA, most notably through India's intentional exclusion of Pakistan from IORA membership. Though the India-Pakistan dispute has generally been terrestrial, it has manifested itself in IORA, as noted above; in the maritime realm; and in other regional maritime organization.

In addition, recent Chinese involvement in the Indian Ocean Region, particularly through the Belt and Road Initiative, has further sparked Indian distrust of a key nation in the strengthening of IORA, in this case, a dialogue partner. Though experts contend that Chinese involvement in the Indian Ocean Region has the potential to greatly benefit IORA proposals, especially those related to the Blue Economy, India sees such involvement as an attempt to shift power in the region from India to China and pushes back accordingly.

== Membership ==
The Association comprises 23 Member States and 12 Dialogue Partners, the Indian Ocean Tourism Organisation and the Indian Ocean Research Group have observer status.

- Australia
- Bangladesh
- Comoros
- France
- India
- Indonesia
- Iran
- Kenya
- Madagascar
- Malaysia
- Maldives
- Mauritius
- Mozambique
- Oman
- Seychelles
- Singapore
- Somalia
- South Africa
- Sri Lanka
- Tanzania
- Thailand
- United Arab Emirates
- Yemen

=== Dialogue Partners ===
Countries with the status of dialogue partners are:

- China
- Egypt
- European Union
- Germany
- Italy
- Japan
- Russia
- Saudi Arabia
- South Korea
- Turkey
- United Kingdom
- United States
- Kuwait

== Summit ==
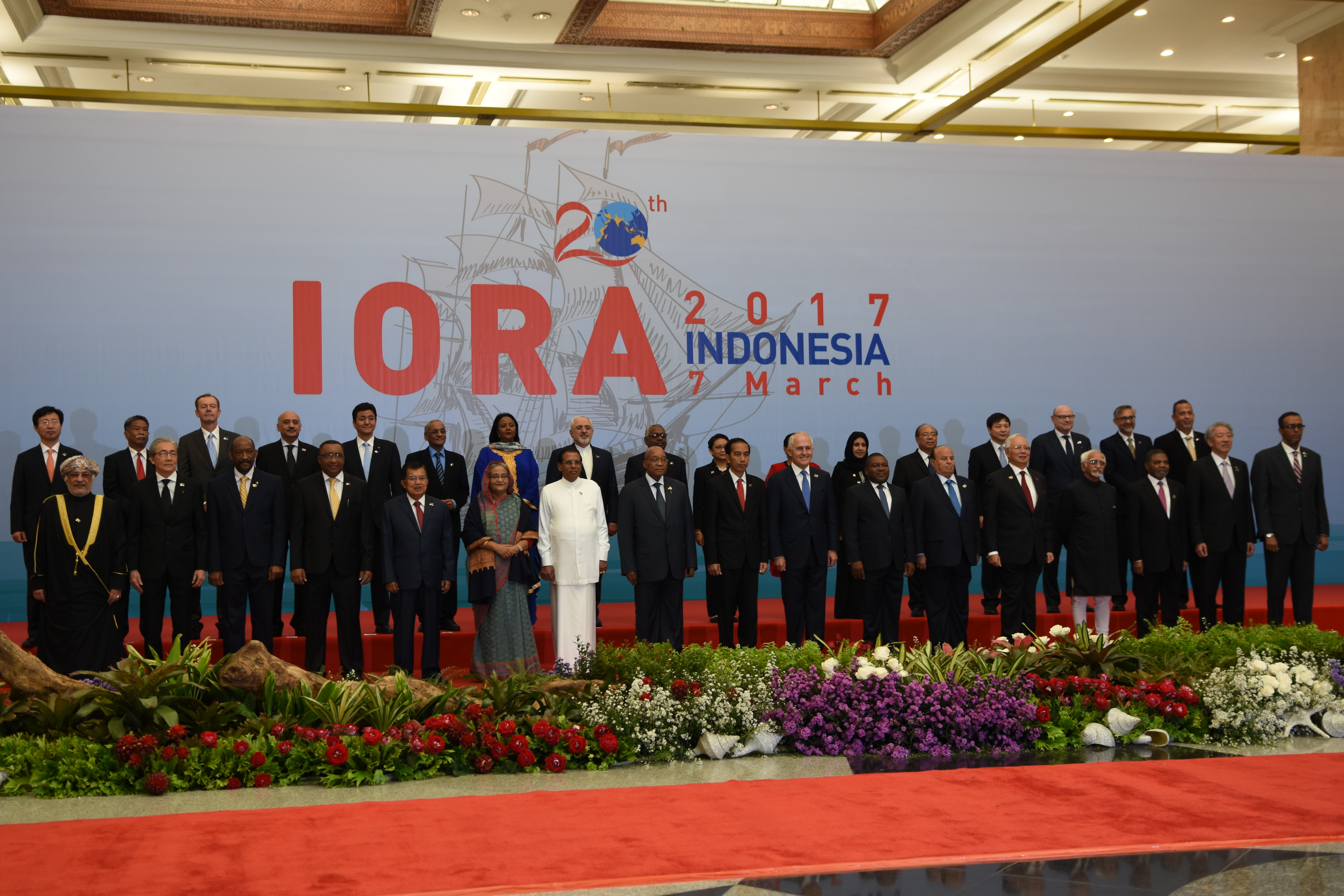
Leaders at the 2017 IORA Summit

Year	#	Dates	Country	City
2017	1st	5–7 March	Indonesia	Jakarta

== Flagship Projects ==
A special fund was created in 2004 for the implementation of special projects that would further IORA's commitment to its priority areas by narrowing the focus of member states' contributions.

=== Fisheries Support Unit (FSU) ===
The first of the projects supported by the Special Fund, the Fisheries Support Unit commenced operations in late 2011, headquartered in Muscat, Oman at the national Centre for Marine Sciences and Fisheries. The aims of the FSU are to enhance cooperation among member states in regards to fisheries and to conduct research to manage and protect fish stocks. Critically, the FSU is exclusively dialogue-based: it does not make decisions or even provide advice on the management of fisheries or issues such as IUU fishing.

=== Regional Center for Science and Technology Transfer (RCSTT) ===
The IORA Regional Center for Science and Technology Transfer (IORA RCSTT) was formed in October 2008, and is based in Tehran, Iran. The center uses its resources to address issues ranging from disaster response to creating a gene banking database for medicinal plants.

=== Indian Ocean Dialogue (IOD) ===
Originating in the 13th Council of Ministries meeting in 2013, the IOD acts as a stand-alone Track 1.5 discussion that brings together scholars and policy makers from member states to participate in discussions on the topics affecting the Indian Ocean Region and IORA member states.

=== The IORA Sustainable Development Program (ISDP) ===
Introduced in 2014, the ISDP is dedicated to the least developed countries in an attempt to share best practices among member states in the Blue Economy, effectively bridging the gap between the rich and poor member states. Similar to most other IORA projects, the ISDP is focused primarily on information sharing and peer-to-peer learning.

== See also ==
- International Conference on Indian Ocean Studies
- Indian Ocean Commission
- Indian Ocean trade
- Asia-Pacific Economic Cooperation
- Global Southeast, a somewhat coterminous region to the Indian Ocean Rim
- Organisation of American States
- Organisation of the Black Sea Economic Cooperation
- Union for the Mediterranean
