= China–Comoros relations =

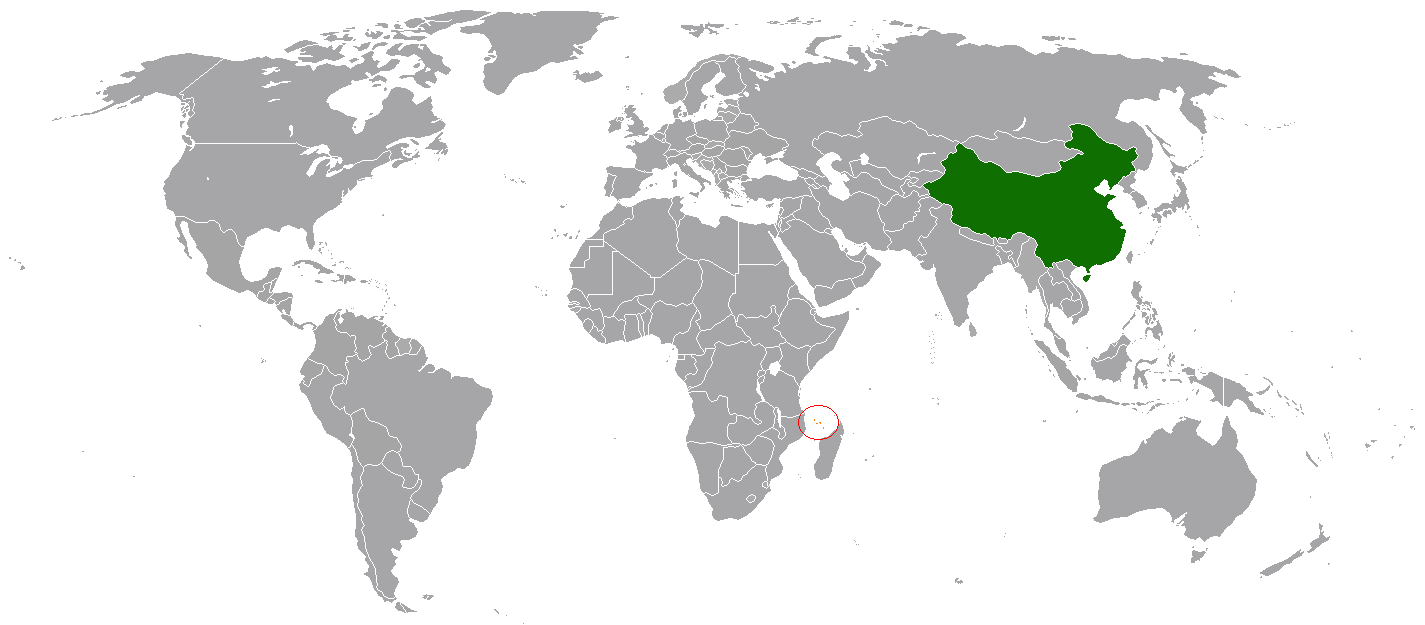

- China: Comoros

Diplomatic mission
- Comorian embassy, Beijing: Chinese embassy, Moroni

China–Comoros relations refers to the current and historical relationship between China and the Comoros. China has an embassy in Moroni and the Comoros has an embassy in Beijing. Relations were established by Comorian President Ali Soilih on 13 November 1975 and have been described as "friendly and cooperative". On 2 September of 2024, they decided to upgrade their relationship to Strategic Partnership.

== Politics ==
China wished to maintain contact with Comoros to counterbalance Indian and Soviet (later Russian) influence in the Indian Ocean. In August 2008, a Comorian delegation visited China on a good-will visit. Together with the Chinese defense minister Liang Guanglie, and Chief of Staff of the Comoros armed forces Salimou Mohamed Amiri, pledged to increase cooperation between the military of the two nations. Amiri stated that Comoros will continue to adhere to the One-China policy.

Comoros was one of 53 countries, that in June 2020, backed the Hong Kong national security law at the United Nations.

== Aid and trade ==
The two countries have an agreement for economic and technological cooperation. In 1976, China began an aid program for Comoros and has helped build a water-supply project at Nioumakélé as well as governmental buildings including the people's palace, office buildings, presidential mansions and television and broadcasting buildings among other projects. Bilateral trade totaled US$760,000 in 2002. In 2010, China was the second largest importer to Comoros after France.

A comprehensive Chinese-assisted treatment campaign has apparently eliminated malaria from the Comorian island of Moheli (population 36,000) – and shows worldwide potential. The campaign is administered by Li Guoqiao, one of the researchers who developed a Chinese herb used as treatment for malaria into artemisinin, probably the most effective antimalarial drug. The campaign is centered at the Tropical Medicine Institute, and the program relies on Artemisia annua of hybrid ancestry, which was used for a drug regimen by which all residents of the island, whether or not visibly ill, took two doses at a 40-day interval. This eliminated the human reservoir of the disease and reduced hospital admissions to 1% or less of January 2008 levels. Visitors to Moheli are now required to take antimalarial drugs, a mix of artemisinin, primaquine and pyrimethamine that China provides for free. When asked about Artemisia exports, Li was quoted as saying, "We want to grow them in China and whatever we export depends on bilateral relationships." Comoros has requested a similar program for Grande Comore and Anjouan, total population 760,000, and Li said that Beijing has agreed in principle.

In 2011, China granted Comoros 4.65 million Euros to build a new 100-bed hospital in Anjouan. Chinese ambassador Wang Leyou heralded it as "... a new step in our pragmatic cooperation of 36 years".

In addition to helping the Comoran government combat malaria, Beijing has also agreed to provide $30 million in funding for the installation of a submerged fiber optic network linking Comoros to the rest of East Africa.

Comoros participates in the Belt and Road Initiative (BRI).

== Culture ==
In 1985, China and Comoros signed an "Agreement for Cultural Cooperation between the Government of the People's Republic of China and the Islamic Union of the Comoros". Part of the cultural exchanged included scholarships for Comorian students to study in China; as of 2006, 5 students were doing so. Eleven Chinese medical professionals were operating in Comoros as well.

== See also ==
- Comoros–North Korea relations
