= 2020 Comorian parliamentary election =

- 19 January 2020 (first round); 23 February 2020 (second round)
- All 24 seats in the Assembly of the Union; 13 seats needed for a majority
Party	Leader	Vote %	Seats	+/–
CRC	Youssoufa Mohamed Ali	60.94	20	+18
Orange Party	Mohamed Daoudou	4.33	2	+2
Independents	–	30.83	2	−1
This lists parties that won seats. See the complete results below.
President of the Assembly before	President of the Assembly after
Abdou Ousseni; UPDC (expelled)	Moustadroine Abdou

Parliamentary elections were held in the Comoros on 19 January 2020; in constituencies where no candidate received a majority, a second round was held alongside local elections on 23 February. The elections were boycotted by the main opposition parties, including the two largest parties in the outgoing Assembly, the Union for the Development of the Comoros and Juwa Party, in protest at constitutional reform and political repression, The result was a landslide victory for President Azali Assoumani's Convention for the Renewal of the Comoros, which won 20 of the 24 elected seats.

== Background ==
Following decades when the politics of the Comoros was shaped by dictatorship, frequent coups, and civil war, the adoption of the December 2001 Constitution inaugurated the only sustained democratic order in the country since its independence from France in 1975. Azali Assoumani, the leader of the last successful military coup in 1999, remained as president after winning multi-party elections in March 2002. Constitutionally barred from serving consecutive terms, Assoumani stepped down from the presidency for a decade in 2006, before being reelected in 2016.

Beginning in late 2017, President Assoumani promoted a vision to make the Comoros into a developing nation by 2030. On 12 April 2018 he "temporarily" suspended the elected Constitutional Court and transferred its duties to a new Constitutional Chamber within the Supreme Court whose members he had appointed. Two weeks later, Assoumani announced that a series of consultations held with representatives of the nation during the preceding months had determined that to realize his vision of development a referendum should be held to revise the constitution.

The constitutional referendum held in July 2018 proposed to permanently abolish the Constitutional Court as well as eliminate the ban on consecutive presidential terms, and amend the Fomboni Agreement reached at the end of the civil war whereby the first round of presidential elections was held on only one of the nation's three islands, rotating between them every five years; instead establishing a two-term limit and alternation between the islands only every ten years, with both cycles to begin anew in 2019.

In the months leading up to the referendum, weekly protests against "authoritarian rule" and clashes with the police occurred in the capital, Moroni. The opposition parties declared a boycott of the poll, and their leaders were detained by the army. The vice president and other members of the administration publicly condemned the proposed reforms, and were sacked by presidential decree. Nevertheless, official results claimed 92.34% support for the constitutional amendments. In the wake of the referendum on Anjouan, the island due to elect the next president according to the now-overturned Fomboni Agreement, a revolt broke out which the military put down by force, and which the administration blamed on "terrorists, as well as drug addicts and alcoholics".

Claiming that he was now eligible to serve for another ten years, Assoumani called a new presidential election in 2019, two years early. The Supreme Court barred the candidates of all major opposition parties from running. Former president and Juwa Party head Ahmed Abdallah Sambi was placed under house arrest; other opposition leaders who went into hiding were tried in absentia and given life sentences at hard labor. The parties prevented from running candidates formed a united organization, the National Council of Transition, and again declared a boycott and protest movement against the "electoral coup d'etat". Assoumani claimed victory in the election in which all other candidates were independents unaffiliated with a political party.

Both protests and the government's measures to suppress dissent escalated after the March 2019 vote. Multiple presidential candidates who rejected the official results were injured or arrested by the police, including one who was shot. Journalists were detained, newspaper issues confiscated, and printing presses raided, in response to which private media declared a boycott of government press conferences.

During an extraordinary session of the Assembly held on the evening of 3 September 2019, the administration won a vote on an enabling act giving President Assoumani the authority to rule by decree, to take any measures deemed necessary to conduct new parliamentary elections. This power was used to strip representatives of parliamentary immunity during a new round of arrests and prosecutions of opposition figures. To prevent the passage of an amnesty bill intended to prevent imprisonment for political activity, the government closed the Assembly on 31 December, before its mandate was set to expire in March 2020.

== Electoral system ==
The 24 members of the Assembly were directly elected in single-member constituencies using the two-round system.

== Campaign ==
A total of 81 candidates were approved to contest the 24 Assembly seats, including 45 independents and 35 candidates from the three parties of L'Alliance de la Mouvance Présidentielle; 21 the CRC, seven from RADHI, led by the manager of Assoumani's 2019 re-election campaign, Houmed Msaidie, and seven from the Orange Party, led by Minister of the Interior, Mohamed Daoudou, who also organized the elections and oversaw the prosecution of opposition figures. Only one candidate from an opposition party ran, representing the Democratic Rally of the Comoros, the party led by former Grand Comore Governor Mouigni Baraka.

The period leading up to election day was noted for the absence of rallies and other forms of mass mobilization typical of previous campaigns. One independent candidate was arrested, allegedly for engaging in opposition activity. The campaigns of the parties in L'Alliance de la Mouvance Présidentielle emphasized a message of mobilizing people behind national development. Representatives of RADHI and the Orange Party insisted their parties were independent and contributed to a real competition of ideas, claiming a special responsibility to hold President Assoumani and the CRC accountable and check any future abuses of power.

== Results ==
Party	First round			Second round			Total seats	+/–
Party	Votes	%	Seats	Votes	%	Seats	Total seats	+/–
Convention for the Renewal of the Comoros	113,826	60.94	16	18,318	54.09	4	20	+18
Orange Party	8,073	4.32	1	6,382	18.85	1	2	+2
RADHI	4,949	2.65	0	310	0.92	0	0	–1
Democratic Rally of the Comoros	2,370	1.27	0				0	–2
Independents	57,555	30.82	2	8,853	26.14	0	2	–1
Total	186,773	100.00	19	33,863	100.00	5	24	–9
Valid votes	186,773	93.09		33,863	90.08			
Invalid/blank votes	13,854	6.91		3,729	9.92			
Total votes	200,627	100.00		37,592	100.00			
Registered voters/turnout	313,649	63.97		59,860	62.80			
Source: CENI, CENI

=== By constituency ===
Nº1 Dewa
Candidate	Party	Votes	%
Chamina Ben Mohamed	Convention for the Renewal of the Comoros	732	53.01
Ibrahim Ahmed Kassim	Independent	417	30.20
Ali Said Chanfi	Independent	163	11.80
Ben Omar Attoumane Tara	Independent	69	5.00
Total		1,381	100.00
Valid votes		1,381	96.64
Invalid/blank votes		48	3.36
Total votes		1,429	100.00
Registered voters/turnout		5,625	25.40

Nº2 Msoutrouni and Moimbassa
Candidate	Party	Votes	%
Abdallah Said Sarouma	Convention for the Renewal of the Comoros	2,227	68.21
Said Bacar Ben Attoumane	Independent	800	24.50
Ahmed Omar Avilaza	RADHI	238	7.29
Total		3,265	100.00
Valid votes		3,265	95.80
Invalid/blank votes		143	4.20
Total votes		3,408	100.00
Registered voters/turnout		6,812	50.03

Nº3 Djando
Candidate	Party	Votes	%
Said Assane Madi	Convention for the Renewal of the Comoros	1,413	53.30
Dhoihir Daroueche	Independent	827	31.20
Saindou Issoufa Djabir	Independent	299	11.28
Bachir Maenfou Said	Independent	112	4.22
Total		2,651	100.00
Valid votes		2,651	95.95
Invalid/blank votes		112	4.05
Total votes		2,763	100.00
Registered voters/turnout		4,149	66.59

Nº4 Mledjele
Candidate	Party	Votes	%
Anfani Hamada Bacar	Convention for the Renewal of the Comoros	2,827	77.62
Achafion Abdillah Toibibou	RADHI	815	22.38
Total		3,642	100.00
Valid votes		3,642	96.81
Invalid/blank votes		120	3.19
Total votes		3,762	100.00
Registered voters/turnout		5,721	65.76

Nº5 Sima
Candidate	Party	Votes	%
Moustadroine Abdou	Convention for the Renewal of the Comoros	20,009	100.00
Total		20,009	100.00
Valid votes		20,009	97.64
Invalid/blank votes		483	2.36
Total votes		20,492	100.00
Registered voters/turnout		22,473	91.18

Nº6 Mutsamudu I
Candidate	Party	Votes	%
Hayda Nourdine Sidi	Convention for the Renewal of the Comoros	4,510	62.35
Fatima Said Ali Ben Omar	Independent	1,558	21.54
Naile Jaffar	Independent	1,148	15.87
Mariama Houmadi Daoud	Independent	17	0.24
Total		7,233	100.00
Valid votes		7,233	95.01
Invalid/blank votes		380	4.99
Total votes		7,613	100.00
Registered voters/turnout		18,632	40.86

Nº7 Mutsamudu II
Candidate	Party	Votes	%
Abou Achiraf Ali Bacar	Convention for the Renewal of the Comoros	4,987	100.00
Total		4,987	100.00
Valid votes		4,987	96.40
Invalid/blank votes		186	3.60
Total votes		5,173	100.00
Registered voters/turnout		7,937	65.18

Nº8 Ouani
Candidate	Party	Votes	%
Mouhouyouddine Affraitane	Independent	4,423	52.82
Soiladine Salim	Convention for the Renewal of the Comoros	2,876	34.34
Kamardine Soilihi	Orange Party	1,075	12.84
Total		8,374	100.00
Valid votes		8,374	96.45
Invalid/blank votes		308	3.55
Total votes		8,682	100.00
Registered voters/turnout		15,068	57.62

Nº9 Cuvette
Candidate	Party	Votes	%
Ladaenti Houmadi	Convention for the Renewal of the Comoros	3,688	64.01
Djanffar Baco	Independent	1,330	23.08
Mounia Ahamadi	RADHI	744	12.91
Total		5,762	100.00
Valid votes		5,762	97.22
Invalid/blank votes		165	2.78
Total votes		5,927	100.00
Registered voters/turnout		7,939	74.66

Nº10 Domoni I
Candidate	Party	First round		Second round	
Candidate	Party	Votes	%	Votes	%
Nourdine Midiladji Abderemane	Independent	976	29.71	1,043	41.69
Salim Mohamed Abderemane	Convention for the Renewal of the Comoros	955	29.07	1,459	58.31
Ibrahim Mohamed Hanif	RADHI	664	20.21		
Madjid Mohamed Chakir	Independent	439	13.36		
Hoistoi Thoueni Said	Orange Party	251	7.64		
Total		3,285	100.00	2,502	100.00
Valid votes		3,285	95.74	2,502	68.79
Invalid/blank votes		146	4.26	1,135	31.21
Total votes		3,431	100.00	3,637	100.00
Registered voters/turnout		10,322	33.24	10,341	35.17

Nº11 Domoni II
Candidate	Party	First round		Second round	
Candidate	Party	Votes	%	Votes	%
Adnani Mouhamadi	Convention for the Renewal of the Comoros	4,884	49.65	9,036	67.79
Dhoimir Samadane	Independent	2,270	23.08	4,293	32.21
Moursoid Massondi	Independent	1,777	18.07		
Abdel Kader Charcane	Independent	905	9.20		
Total		9,836	100.00	13,329	100.00
Valid votes		9,836	97.07	13,329	95.11
Invalid/blank votes		297	2.93	685	4.89
Total votes		10,133	100.00	14,014	100.00
Registered voters/turnout		15,790	64.17	15,162	92.43

Nº12 Nioumakele I
Candidate	Party	Votes	%
Mohamed Ahmed Said	Convention for the Renewal of the Comoros	11,365	88.07
Abibou Ben Mahamoud	Orange Party	1,064	8.24
Halidi Abderemane Ibrahim	Independent	476	3.69
Total		12,905	100.00
Valid votes		12,905	96.83
Invalid/blank votes		423	3.17
Total votes		13,328	100.00
Registered voters/turnout		14,540	91.66

Nº13 Nioumakele II
Candidate	Party	Votes	%
Mohamed Mourchidi	Convention for the Renewal of the Comoros	5,956	60.36
Nadhuf Ahmed Oili	Independent	2,095	21.23
Ahamadi Houmadi Soufou	Independent	1,817	18.41
Total		9,868	100.00
Valid votes		9,868	98.11
Invalid/blank votes		190	1.89
Total votes		10,058	100.00
Registered voters/turnout		11,064	90.91

Nº14 Moroni North
Candidate	Party	First round		Second round	
Candidate	Party	Votes	%	Votes	%
Abdou Said Mdahoma	Convention for the Renewal of the Comoros	583	38.33	2,167	87.48
Mohamed Ahmed	RADHI	416	27.35	310	12.52
Kassim Ibrahim	Orange Party	205	13.48		
Mohamed Farouk Attoumani	Independent	137	9.01		
Mze Abdou Soule Elbak	Independent	126	8.28		
Ahamadi Houmadi Farida	Independent	54	3.55		
Total		1,521	100.00	2,477	100.00
Valid votes		1,521	95.24	2,477	89.45
Invalid/blank votes		76	4.76	292	10.55
Total votes		1,597	100.00	2,769	100.00
Registered voters/turnout		8,650	18.46	8,787	31.51

Nº15 Moroni South
Candidate	Party	Votes	%
Djoumoi Idjabou Mroivili	Orange Party	2,388	69.26
Tourqui Said Ahmed Chams-Eddine	Independent	543	15.75
Jose Chakhrina Nourdine Abodo	Independent	381	11.05
Karimou Abdoulwahabi	Independent	136	3.94
Total		3,448	100.00
Valid votes		3,448	95.38
Invalid/blank votes		167	4.62
Total votes		3,615	100.00
Registered voters/turnout		8,428	42.89

Nº16 Bambao
Candidate	Party	Votes	%
Maoulida Mmadi Issihaka	Convention for the Renewal of the Comoros	10,355	66.01
Youssouf Ismael Mmadi	Independent	2,435	15.52
Moussa Ibrahim	Independent	1,732	11.04
Said Abdillah Said Ahmed	Independent	1,164	7.42
Total		15,686	100.00
Valid votes		15,686	93.73
Invalid/blank votes		1,050	6.27
Total votes		16,736	100.00
Registered voters/turnout		21,689	77.16

Nº17 Oichili-Dimani
Candidate	Party	Votes	%
Zoubeiri Mohamed Ahamed	Convention for the Renewal of the Comoros	6,224	72.42
El-Anrif Mohamed	Democratic Rally of the Comoros	2,370	27.58
Total		8,594	100.00
Valid votes		8,594	61.44
Invalid/blank votes		5,393	38.56
Total votes		13,987	100.00
Registered voters/turnout		15,340	91.18

Nº18 Itsandra North
Candidate	Party	Votes	%
Abdoul Aziz Mohamed	Convention for the Renewal of the Comoros	4,441	60.57
Saadi Salim	Independent	1,940	26.46
Ahamada Said	Independent	951	12.97
Total		7,332	100.00
Valid votes		7,332	95.43
Invalid/blank votes		351	4.57
Total votes		7,683	100.00
Registered voters/turnout		13,563	56.65

Nº19 Itsandra South
Candidate	Party	First round		Second round	
Candidate	Party	Votes	%	Votes	%
Soilihi Abdou	Independent	1,460	29.05	3,517	49.68
Hassani Mohamed	Orange Party	1,404	27.94	3,563	50.32
Abdoul El Wahab Moussa	RADHI	1,396	27.78		
Alloui Said Abasse	Independent	765	15.22		
Total		5,025	100.00	7,080	100.00
Valid votes		5,025	94.21	7,080	89.22
Invalid/blank votes		309	5.79	855	10.78
Total votes		5,334	100.00	7,935	100.00
Registered voters/turnout		11,661	45.74	11,661	68.05

Nº20 Mitsamiouli-Mboude
Candidate	Party	Votes	%
Mohamed Ahamada Baco	Independent	6,696	51.52
Chamsoudine Soule	Independent	2,650	20.39
Abdou Mbalia Zainoudine	Independent	2,520	19.39
Mohamed Maamoune Mohamoud	Independent	1,130	8.69
Total		12,996	100.00
Valid votes		12,996	91.81
Invalid/blank votes		1,160	8.19
Total votes		14,156	100.00
Registered voters/turnout		28,516	49.64

Nº21 Hambou
Candidate	Party	Votes	%
Dawiat Mohamed	Convention for the Renewal of the Comoros	6,371	80.45
Said Athoumani	Independent	1,548	19.55
Total		7,919	100.00
Valid votes		7,919	93.40
Invalid/blank votes		560	6.60
Total votes		8,479	100.00
Registered voters/turnout		12,621	67.18

Nº22 Hamahamet-Mboinkou
Candidate	Party	Votes	%
Ali Mohamed Abdou	Convention for the Renewal of the Comoros	5,338	63.88
Mohamed Assoumani	Independent	1,822	21.80
Mohamed Said Hassane	Independent	1,196	14.31
Total		8,356	100.00
Valid votes		8,356	93.61
Invalid/blank votes		570	6.39
Total votes		8,926	100.00
Registered voters/turnout		17,182	51.95

Nº23 Ngouengwe
Candidate	Party	First round		Second round	
Candidate	Party	Votes	%	Votes	%
Ali Said	Convention for the Renewal of the Comoros	4,658	45.86	5,656	66.74
Ahmed Youssouf	Orange Party	1,686	16.60	2,819	33.26
Antoisse Mohamed Ibrahim	Independent	1,386	13.65		
Ahmed Said Abdallah	Independent	1,258	12.39		
Mariama Mohamed	RADHI	676	6.66		
Soilihi Mohamed	Independent	492	4.84		
Total		10,156	100.00	8,475	100.00
Valid votes		10,156	95.25	8,475	91.75
Invalid/blank votes		507	4.75	762	8.25
Total votes		10,663	100.00	9,237	100.00
Registered voters/turnout		13,565	78.61	13,909	66.41

Nº24 Itsahidi
Candidate	Party	Votes	%
Abdou-Rahim Mistoihi	Convention for the Renewal of the Comoros	9,427	75.16
Habdallah Ali Mohamed	Independent	2,045	16.31
Mnemoi Ahmed Doudou	Independent	1,070	8.53
Total		12,542	100.00
Valid votes		12,542	94.64
Invalid/blank votes		710	5.36
Total votes		13,252	100.00
Registered voters/turnout		16,362	80.99
