= List of heads of state of the Comoros =

President of the Union of the Comoros
- قائمة رؤساء جزر القمر; Président de l'Union des Comores
- National Seal

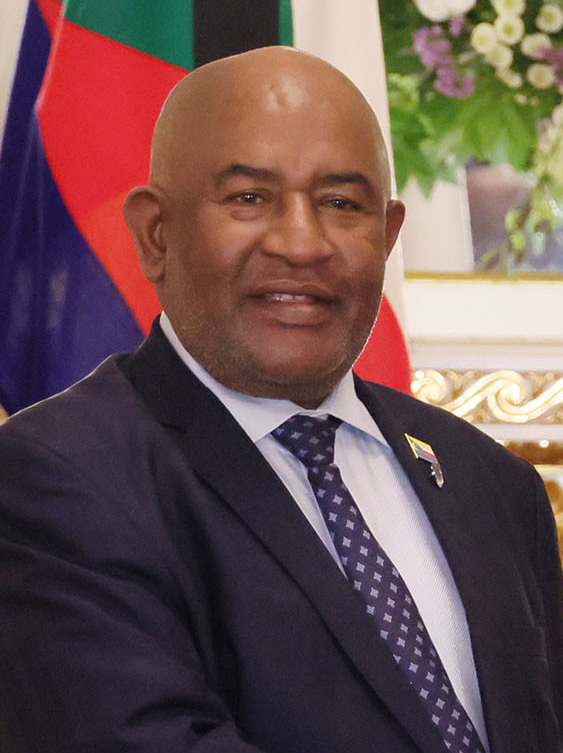
- Incumbent; Azali Assoumani since 3 April 2019
- Term length: Five years, renewable once
- Constituting instrument: Constitution of the Comoros (2001)
- Inaugural holder: Ahmed Abdallah (State of the Comoros; First president of the Federal and Islamic Republic of the Comoros); Ali Soilih (State of the Comoros; First president); Azali Assoumani (Union of the Comoros)
- Formation: 27 October 1977; 49 years ago
- Succession: Line of succession
- Deputy: Abolished, Vice-President of the Comoros
- Salary: CF 53,557,291 / US$117,060 annually
- Website: Official Website

This article lists the heads of state of the Comoros, since the country gained independence from France in 1975. The president is the leader of the executive branch of the government and the commander-in-chief of the armed forces.

== Term limits ==
A new constitution, approved in the 2018 constitutional referendum, allows the president to run for two consecutive five-year terms. Previously during the time of the Union of the Comoros, there was a one-term rotational system in place to share the presidency between Anjouan, Grande Comore, and Mohéli.

== List of officeholders ==
=== State of the Comoros (1975–1978) ===
No.	Portrait	Name (Birth–Death)	Title	Term of office			Party	Election	Government	Ref.
No.	Portrait	Name (Birth–Death)	Title	Took office	Left office	Time in office	Party	Election	Government	Ref.
1		Ahmed Abdallah (1919–1989)	President of the Government (until 7 July 1975)	6 July 1975	3 August 1975	28 days	Comorian Democratic Union	―	Abdallah I	
1		Ahmed Abdallah (1919–1989)	Head of State	6 July 1975	3 August 1975	28 days	Comorian Democratic Union	―	Abdallah I	
2		Said Mohamed Jaffar (1918–1993)	Chairman of the National Council of the Revolution (until 10 August 1975)	3 August 1975	3 January 1976	153 days	Democratic Rally of the Comorian People	―	National Council of the Revolution	
2		Said Mohamed Jaffar (1918–1993)	Chairman of the National Executive Council	3 August 1975	3 January 1976	153 days	Democratic Rally of the Comorian People	―	National Executive Council	
3		Ali Soilih (1937–1978)	Head of State (until 28 October 1977)	3 January 1976	13 May 1978	2 years, 130 days	Democratic Rally of the Comorian People	―	―	
3		Ali Soilih (1937–1978)	President	3 January 1976	13 May 1978	2 years, 130 days	Democratic Rally of the Comorian People	―	―	
4		Said Atthoumani	Chairman of the Politico-Military Directorate	13 May 1978	23 May 1978	10 days	Independent	―	―	

=== Federal Islamic Republic of the Comoros (1978–2001) ===
No.	Portrait	Name (Birth–Death)	Title	Term of office			Party	Election
No.	Portrait	Name (Birth–Death)	Title	Took office	Left office	Time in office	Party	Election
―	Ahmed Abdallah & Mohamed Ahmed	Ahmed Abdallah & Mohamed Ahmed (1919–1989) (1917–1984)	Co-Chairmen of the Politico-Military Directorate (until 22 July 1978) Co-Chairmen of the Directorate	23 May 1978	3 October 1978	133 days	UDC	―
(1)	Ahmed Abdallah	Ahmed Abdallah (1919–1989)	Chairman of the Directorate (until 25 October 1978) President	3 October 1978	26 November 1989 †	11 years, 54 days	UDC	1978; 1984
―	Said Mohamed Djohar	Said Mohamed Djohar (1919–2006); Acting	Acting President	27 November 1989	20 March 1990	113 days	UDC	―
5	Said Mohamed Djohar	Said Mohamed Djohar (1919–2006)	President	20 March 1990	29 September 1995	5 years, 193 days	UCP	1990
―	Combo Ayouba	Combo Ayouba (1952–2010)	Coordinator of the Transitional Military Committee	29 September 1995	2 October 1995	3 days	Military	―
―	Mohamed Taki Abdoulkarim & Said Ali Kemal	Mohamed Taki Abdoulkarim & Said Ali Kemal; Acting (1936–1998) (1938–2020)	Acting President	2 October 1995	5 October 1995	3 days	National Union for Democracy (Comoros); Party of Unity and Fraternity of the Islands	―
―	Caabi El-Yachroutu Mohamed	Caabi El-Yachroutu Mohamed (born 1949); Acting	Interim President	5 October 1995	26 January 1996	113 days	RDR	―
(5)	Said Mohamed Djohar	Said Mohamed Djohar (1919–2006)	President	26 January 1996	25 March 1996	59 days	RDR	1996
6	Mohamed Taki Abdoulkarim	Mohamed Taki Abdoulkarim (1936–1998)	President	25 March 1996	6 November 1998 †	2 years, 226 days	RDR	―
―	Tadjidine Massounde	Tadjidine Massounde (1933–2004); Acting	Interim President	6 November 1998	30 April 1999	175 days	Independent	―
7	Azali Assoumani	Colonel; Azali Assoumani (born 1959)	Chief of Staff of the National Development Army (until 6 May 1999) Head of State	30 April 1999	23 December 2001	2 years, 237 days	Military	―

=== Union of the Comoros (2001–present) ===
No.	Portrait	Name (Birth–Death)	Term of office			Party	Election	Government	Ref.
No.	Portrait	Name (Birth–Death)	Took office	Left office	Time in office	Party	Election	Government	Ref.
Head of State
(7)		Colonel; Azali Assoumani (born 1959)	23 December 2001	21 January 2002	29 days	Army of National Development	―	―	
President
―		Hamada Madi (born 1965) acting	21 January 2002	26 May 2002	125 days	Republican Party	―	Madi	
(7)		Azali Assoumani (born 1959)	26 May 2002	26 May 2006	4 years	Convention for the Renewal of the Comoros	2002	Assoumani I	
8		Ahmed Sambi (born 1958)	26 May 2006	26 May 2011	5 years	Independent	2006	Sambi	
9		Ikililou Dhoinine (born 1962)	26 May 2011	26 May 2016	5 years	Baobab Movement	2010	Dhoinine	
(7)		Azali Assoumani (born 1959)	26 May 2016	13 February 2019	2 years, 263 days	Convention for the Renewal of the Comoros	2016	Assoumani II	
―		Moustadroine Abdou (born 1969) acting	13 February 2019	3 April 2019	49 days	Convention for the Renewal of the Comoros	―	―	
(7)		Azali Assoumani (born 1959)	3 April 2019	Incumbent	7 years, 232 days	Convention for the Renewal of the Comoros	2019	Assoumani III	
(7)		Azali Assoumani (born 1959)	3 April 2019	Incumbent	7 years, 232 days	Convention for the Renewal of the Comoros	2024	Assoumani IV	

== Succession ==
Article 58 of the Comorian Constitution states that "in case of absolute absence of a President" the following should happen:

- If the absence (death, resignation, etc.) should occur within the first 900 days of the term, the cabinet ministers and other members of the government select among the ministers a "main minister" to serve as Interim President. Elections must also be called in no more than 60 days after the absence of the President occurs; the person who wins those elections will be president for the remainder of the original five-year presidential term.
- If the absence should occur beyond the first 900 days of the term, then the Governor of the island currently holding the presidency will assume the presidency until the end of the original five-year presidential term, at which point regular elections are held.

== Latest election ==
Candidate	Party	Votes	%
Azali Assoumani	Convention for the Renewal of the Comoros	99,541	57.02
Salim Issa Abdillah	Juwa Party	19,325	11.07
Mohamed Daoudou	Orange Party	17,854	10.23
Bourhane Hamidou	Independent	17,569	10.06
Mouigni Baraka	Democratic Rally of the Comoros	17,497	10.02
Aboudou Soefou	TSASI	2,796	1.60
Total		174,582	100.00
Valid votes		174,582	91.26
Invalid/blank votes		16,715	8.74
Total votes		191,297	100.00
Registered voters/turnout		338,940	56.44
Source: CENI

== See also ==
- History of the Comoros
- Politics of the Comoros
- List of sultans in the Comoros
- List of colonial governors of the Comoros
- List of prime ministers of the Comoros
- Vice-President of the Comoros
