= 2015 Comorian parliamentary election =

← 2009	25 January 2015 (first round); 22 February 2015 (second round)	2020 →
- 24 of the 33 seats in the Assembly of the Union; 17 seats needed for a majority
- Turnout: 71.35%
Party	Leader	Vote %	Seats
UPDC	Mohamed Halifa	18.47	8
Juwa	Ahmed Abdallah Mohamed Sambi	17.99	7
RDC	Mouigni Baraka	10.42	2
CRC	Azali Assoumani	7.24	2
RADHI		3.57	1
PEC		1.60	1
Independents	–	24.82	3
This lists parties that won seats. See the complete results below.

Parliamentary elections were held in the Comoros on 25 January 2015, alongside local elections. A second round of voting was held on 22 February in the 21 constituencies where no candidate won in the first round. The Union for the Development of the Comoros emerged as the largest party, winning eight of the 24 seats in the Assembly of the Union.

== Background ==
The term of the Assembly of the Union elected in 2009 was due to expire in April 2014, but was extended. Elections were initially scheduled for early November 2014, but in September President Ikililou Dhoinine announced that they would be delayed until 28 December, with the second round planned for 1 February. They were later delayed again until January 2015.

== Electoral system ==
The 33 members of the Assembly of the Union were elected by two methods; 24 members were directly elected in single member constituencies using the two-round system, whilst nine members were elected by the Island assemblies.

== Campaign ==
The campaigning period officially began on 25 December. A total of 204 candidates registered to run for election to the Assembly, whilst 353 candidates contested the council elections.

== Results ==
Party	First round			Second round			Total seats
Party	Votes	%	Seats	Votes	%	Seats	Total seats
Union for the Development of the Comoros	33,229	18.47	2	49,079	29.07	6	8
Juwa Party	32,373	17.99	1	34,569	20.47	6	7
Democratic Rally of the Comoros	18,751	10.42	0	35,953	21.29	2	2
Convention for the Renewal of the Comoros	13,030	7.24	0	17,123	10.14	2	2
Orange Party	10,843	6.03	0	1,644	0.97	0	0
RADHI	6,415	3.57	0	8,615	5.10	1	1
Party for the Comorian Agreement	2,878	1.60	0	3,262	1.93	1	1
Rally for Democracy and Renewal	2,865	1.59	0				0
National Alliance for the Comoros	2,742	1.52	0				0
Comorian Union for Progress	2,713	1.51	0				0
Movement for the Republic, Openness, and Unity of the Comoros Archipelago	2,308	1.28	0				0
National Union for Democracy in the Comoros	1,332	0.74	0				0
WWW	1,094	0.61	0				0
Djawabu Party	947	0.53	0				0
Bassemala Party	907	0.50	0				0
Rally for a Development Initiative with an Enlightened Youth	810	0.45	0				0
National Rally for Development–Renewal	665	0.37	0				0
Massaka	420	0.23	0				0
ADD ZAM-ZAM	406	0.23	0				0
Islands' Fraternity and Unity Party	277	0.15	0				0
Democratic Front	255	0.14	0				0
Mwashiwa Party	170	0.09	0				0
MCJC	112	0.06	0				0
Social Democrat Party of the Comoros–Dudja	86	0.05	0				0
Independent	44,283	24.61	0	18,603	11.02	3	3
Island Representatives							9
Total	179,911	100.00	3	168,848	100.00	21	33
Valid votes	179,911	91.85		168,848	91.87		
Invalid/blank votes	15,960	8.15		14,946	8.13		
Total votes	195,871	100.00		183,794	100.00		
Registered voters/turnout	274,505	71.35		251,595	73.05		
Source: CENI, CENI

=== By constituency ===
Nº1 Dewa
Candidate	Party	First round		Second round	
Candidate	Party	Votes	%	Votes	%
Ahmed Bacar Salim	Independent	1,185	34.25	2,037	55.92
Ali Said Chanfi	Union for the Development of the Comoros	1,111	32.11	1,606	44.08
Issa Mohamed Soilihi	Juwa Party	450	13.01		
Mohamed Nafion Abdouhalim	Independent	410	11.85		
Mouayadhi Salim Boinaidi	Independent	304	8.79		
Total		3,460	100.00	3,643	100.00
Valid votes		3,460	96.16	3,643	96.50
Invalid/blank votes		138	3.84	132	3.50
Total votes		3,598	100.00	3,775	100.00
Registered voters/turnout		5,079	70.84	5,079	74.33

Nº2 Msoutrouni and Moimbassa
Candidate	Party	Votes	%
Said Baco Attoumani	Union for the Development of the Comoros	2,456	56.05
Archadi Mouhamed	Juwa Party	888	20.26
Abdallah Said Sarouma	Convention for the Renewal of the Comoros	629	14.35
Mohamed Malik M'nemoi	Orange Party	123	2.81
Ahmed Abdillah	Rally for Democracy and Renewal	112	2.56
Hidayati Salim Madi	Comorian Union for Progress	95	2.17
Zahariat Said Ahmed Mohamed	Independent	79	1.80
Total		4,382	100.00
Valid votes		4,382	94.24
Invalid/blank votes		268	5.76
Total votes		4,650	100.00
Registered voters/turnout		6,091	76.34

Nº3 Djando
Candidate	Party	First round		Second round	
Candidate	Party	Votes	%	Votes	%
Abdallah Ahamadi	Union for the Development of the Comoros	1,349	46.31	1,724	60.15
Said Assane Madi	Independent	774	26.57	1,142	39.85
Yayha Mhoma Soilihi	Juwa Party	451	15.48		
Haidar Youssoufa	Convention for the Renewal of the Comoros	339	11.64		
Total		2,913	100.00	2,866	100.00
Valid votes		2,913	96.68	2,866	96.11
Invalid/blank votes		100	3.32	116	3.89
Total votes		3,013	100.00	2,982	100.00
Registered voters/turnout		3,597	83.76	3,597	82.90

Nº4 Mledjele
Candidate	Party	Votes	%
Hachim Ramiara	Union for the Development of the Comoros	1,675	51.02
Moustadrane Hamadi	Independent	1,304	39.72
Anfani Hamada Bacar	Convention for the Renewal of the Comoros	304	9.26
Total		3,283	100.00
Valid votes		3,283	95.94
Invalid/blank votes		139	4.06
Total votes		3,422	100.00
Registered voters/turnout		4,651	73.58

Nº5 Sima
Candidate	Party	First round		Second round	
Candidate	Party	Votes	%	Votes	%
Dhoihir Dhoulkamal	Independent	2,830	21.91	6,616	55.32
Ibrahim Ahamadi	Juwa Party	2,370	18.35		
Bacar Ali Combo	Union for the Development of the Comoros	2,225	17.23	5,344	44.68
Chamssidine Sidi	Independent	1,476	11.43		
Houmadi Abdou	Orange Party	1,425	11.03		
Rafiki Zoubert	WWW	1,094	8.47		
Mohamed Bacar	Independent	647	5.01		
Abiomri Ahamadi	National Alliance for the Comoros	435	3.37		
Madjide Attoumae	Independent	308	2.38		
Said Chafi	Bassemala Party	105	0.81		
Total		12,915	100.00	11,960	100.00
Valid votes		12,915	93.41	11,960	85.26
Invalid/blank votes		911	6.59	2,068	14.74
Total votes		13,826	100.00	14,028	100.00
Registered voters/turnout		19,346	71.47	19,346	72.51

Nº6 Mutsamudu I
Candidate	Party	First round		Second round	
Candidate	Party	Votes	%	Votes	%
Bacar Abdou Dossar Mohamed	Juwa Party	3,743	39.73	5,655	59.76
Mohamed Issouf	Independent	1,880	19.95		
Bacari Abdou	Union for the Development of the Comoros	1,816	19.27	3,808	40.24
Ahamed Majani	Independent	426	4.52		
Youssouf Salim	Massaka	420	4.46		
Naile Jaffar	National Alliance for the Comoros	353	3.75		
Nasser-Eddine Allaoui	Independent	291	3.09		
Halidi Houmadi Said	Bassemala Party	248	2.63		
Adinane Assadi	Orange Party	245	2.60		
Total		9,422	100.00	9,463	100.00
Valid votes		9,422	89.43	9,463	90.60
Invalid/blank votes		1,114	10.57	982	9.40
Total votes		10,536	100.00	10,445	100.00
Registered voters/turnout		17,443	60.40	17,443	59.88

Nº7 Mutsamudu II
Candidate	Party	First round		Second round	
Candidate	Party	Votes	%	Votes	%
Abdou Salami Abdou	Juwa Party	1,709	34.17	2,376	48.92
Abou Achirafi Ali Bacar	Independent	1,437	28.73	2,481	51.08
Omar Bacar Saindou	Independent	956	19.11		
Dhounouraine Ali Bacar	Orange Party	686	13.71		
Ahmed Salim Abderemane	Independent	214	4.28		
Total		5,002	100.00	4,857	100.00
Valid votes		5,002	95.73	4,857	95.95
Invalid/blank votes		223	4.27	205	4.05
Total votes		5,225	100.00	5,062	100.00
Registered voters/turnout		6,937	75.32	6,937	72.97

Nº8 Ouani
Candidate	Party	First round		Second round	
Candidate	Party	Votes	%	Votes	%
Abdallah Ben Omar	Juwa Party	1,732	21.67	4,235	52.01
Houledi Brahim	Independent	1,704	21.32	3,907	47.99
Kamal Zada Ahamadi	Rally for Democracy and Renewal	1,308	16.37		
Ibrahim Ben Omar Hamza	Union for the Development of the Comoros	849	10.62		
Abdallah Mohamed	Independent	793	9.92		
Said Ahmed Kassim	Independent	507	6.34		
Attoumane Abasse Cheikh	Orange Party	423	5.29		
Idrisse Abdou Mohamed	Independent	274	3.43		
Nassurdine Haloume	Independent	246	3.08		
Binti Salime	National Alliance for the Comoros	156	1.95		
Total		7,992	100.00	8,142	100.00
Valid votes		7,992	92.46	8,142	95.35
Invalid/blank votes		652	7.54	397	4.65
Total votes		8,644	100.00	8,539	100.00
Registered voters/turnout		14,196	60.89	14,196	60.15

Nº9 Cuvette
Candidate	Party	First round		Second round	
Candidate	Party	Votes	%	Votes	%
Soifa Ousseni	Union for the Development of the Comoros	1,606	30.68	3,220	58.48
Ansuani Attoumani	Juwa Party	1,502	28.70	2,286	41.52
Said Ahmed Rachad	Independent	1,224	23.39		
Saindou Malide	Convention for the Renewal of the Comoros	221	4.22		
Dahilou Omar	Independent	204	3.90		
Abdou Ahamadi	Independent	188	3.59		
Nassur Bacar	National Alliance for the Comoros	168	3.21		
Mohamadi Ousseni	Independent	121	2.31		
Total		5,234	100.00	5,506	100.00
Valid votes		5,234	92.15	5,506	93.31
Invalid/blank votes		446	7.85	395	6.69
Total votes		5,680	100.00	5,901	100.00
Registered voters/turnout		8,089	70.22	8,089	72.95

Nº10 Domoni I
Candidate	Party	First round		Second round	
Candidate	Party	Votes	%	Votes	%
Mohamed Rachidi Abdou	Juwa Party	1,094	21.58	2,618	51.97
Nourdine Midiladji Abderemane	Independent	730	14.40	2,420	48.03
Ousseni Abderemane	Union for the Development of the Comoros	658	12.98		
Said El Hadi Loukmann	Independent	598	11.79		
Abdallah Ahmed Abderemane	Comorian Union for Progress	455	8.97		
Ahmed Abdulwahid	Independent	443	8.74		
Andili Ali Abasse	Independent	355	7.00		
Mohamed Abdou	Orange Party	305	6.02		
Abdallah Ben Ali Ahmed	Independent	291	5.74		
Salim Abdallah Mchangama	Bassemala Party	141	2.78		
Total		5,070	100.00	5,038	100.00
Valid votes		5,070	91.93	5,038	89.61
Invalid/blank votes		445	8.07	584	10.39
Total votes		5,515	100.00	5,622	100.00
Registered voters/turnout		10,346	53.31	9,143	61.49

Nº11 Domoni II
Candidate	Party	First round		Second round	
Candidate	Party	Votes	%	Votes	%
Tadjidine Mohamed	Juwa Party	1,974	27.33	4,804	56.11
Dhoiffir Houmadi	Union for the Development of the Comoros	1,254	17.36	3,757	43.89
Moursoid Massondi	Independent	1,210	16.75		
Nassufouddine Houmadi	Independent	758	10.49		
Tadjouddine Mohamed Said	Orange Party	477	6.60		
Kambi Houmadi Oili	Convention for the Renewal of the Comoros	451	6.24		
Attoumane Ali Madi	Independent	428	5.93		
Matroifi Souf Oili	Bassemala Party	413	5.72		
Abdel-Kader Charcane	Independent	258	3.57		
Total		7,223	100.00	8,561	100.00
Valid votes		7,223	86.92	8,561	92.51
Invalid/blank votes		1,087	13.08	693	7.49
Total votes		8,310	100.00	9,254	100.00
Registered voters/turnout		15,099	55.04	15,099	61.29

Nº12 Nioumakele I
Candidate	Party	First round		Second round	
Candidate	Party	Votes	%	Votes	%
Abdou Ousseni	Union for the Development of the Comoros	1,830	27.56	5,640	61.90
Saindou Ahmed Salim	Juwa Party	1,415	21.31	3,471	38.10
Takiddine Youssouf	Independent	943	14.20		
Nassuri Tiulibou	Independent	668	10.06		
Saendou Djazila	Independent	528	7.95		
Soumaila Moustakima	Independent	388	5.84		
Mohamed Youssouf	Independent	372	5.60		
Said Ali Mahamoud	Independent	275	4.14		
Abdou Tadji Selemane	Orange Party	221	3.33		
Total		6,640	100.00	9,111	100.00
Valid votes		6,640	87.00	9,111	93.58
Invalid/blank votes		992	13.00	625	6.42
Total votes		7,632	100.00	9,736	100.00
Registered voters/turnout		12,294	62.08	12,964	75.10

Nº13 Nioumakele II
Candidate	Party	First round		Second round	
Candidate	Party	Votes	%	Votes	%
Nassimou Ahamadi	Juwa Party	2,221	36.61	3,202	53.97
Toyhane Combo Houmadi	Union for the Development of the Comoros	1,303	21.48	2,731	46.03
Kamal Issouf	Independent	902	14.87		
Soibaha Abdallah	Comorian Union for Progress	716	11.80		
Assani Houmadi	Independent	459	7.57		
Dhoihirddine Ahamada	Rally for Democracy and Renewal	336	5.54		
Soulaimana Kaambi	RADHI	129	2.13		
Total		6,066	100.00	5,933	100.00
Valid votes		6,066	89.92	5,933	96.27
Invalid/blank votes		680	10.08	230	3.73
Total votes		6,746	100.00	6,163	100.00
Registered voters/turnout		10,341	65.24	9,912	62.18

Nº14 Moroni North
Candidate	Party	Votes	%
Ibrahim Mohamed Soulé	Juwa Party	2,129	51.18
Abdoulfatah Said Mohamed	Orange Party	759	18.25
Mohamed Hassan	Independent	427	10.26
Daroueche Mogni	Democratic Rally of the Comoros	311	7.48
Mohamed Kaambi Mohamed	RADHI	209	5.02
Moussa Mohamed Ahmed	National Alliance for the Comoros	156	3.75
Dahalani Abdillah	Independent	110	2.64
Mohamed Msoilihi Soibaouma	Comorian Union for Progress	59	1.42
Total		4,160	100.00
Valid votes		4,160	90.16
Invalid/blank votes		454	9.84
Total votes		4,614	100.00
Registered voters/turnout		8,613	53.57

Nº15 Moroni South
Candidate	Party	First round		Second round	
Candidate	Party	Votes	%	Votes	%
Mohamed Msaidié	Juwa Party	1,403	36.02	1,879	53.34
Mohamed Daoudou	Orange Party	1,201	30.83	1,644	46.66
Ibrahim Abdourazak	Union for the Development of the Comoros	536	13.76		
Mahamoud Abdallah	Democratic Rally of the Comoros	207	5.31		
El-Farouk Mroivili M'madi	Convention for the Renewal of the Comoros	125	3.21		
Said Tourqui Said-Ahmed	National Alliance for the Comoros	104	2.67		
Mohamed Djalim Ali	Independent	89	2.28		
Said Abdallah Ahmed	Social Democrat Party of the Comoros–Dudja	86	2.21		
Said Abdallah Cheick Soilihi	Independent	78	2.00		
Ahmed Koudra Abderemane	Movement for the Republic, Openness, and Unity of the Comoros Archipelago	66	1.69		
Total		3,895	100.00	3,523	100.00
Valid votes		3,895	92.15	3,523	94.55
Invalid/blank votes		332	7.85	203	5.45
Total votes		4,227	100.00	3,726	100.00
Registered voters/turnout		7,274	58.11	6,451	57.76

Nº16 Bambao
Candidate	Party	First round		Second round	
Candidate	Party	Votes	%	Votes	%
Soulé Issilam Mohamed	Democratic Rally of the Comoros	2,803	21.32	6,649	48.76
Issa Soulé Mmadi	Union for the Development of the Comoros	2,353	17.89	6,987	51.24
Said Ali Said Chayhane	Convention for the Renewal of the Comoros	2,053	15.61		
Ahamada Ivessi Ali	Juwa Party	1,873	14.24		
Ibrahim Mhoma	Independent	1,119	8.51		
Ahmed Cheik Mohamed	Movement for the Republic, Openness, and Unity of the Comoros Archipelago	938	7.13		
Mohamed Toiaamou Mhidini	Orange Party	761	5.79		
Ali Mohamed Soulaimana	Independent	750	5.70		
Mohamed Abdou Salami	National Alliance for the Comoros	500	3.80		
Total		13,150	100.00	13,636	100.00
Valid votes		13,150	90.28	13,636	90.80
Invalid/blank votes		1,415	9.72	1,382	9.20
Total votes		14,565	100.00	15,018	100.00
Registered voters/turnout		18,756	77.66	18,756	80.07

Nº17 Oichili-Dimani
Candidate	Party	First round		Second round	
Candidate	Party	Votes	%	Votes	%
Charif Moulana	Convention for the Renewal of the Comoros	2,129	21.68	5,177	55.10
Djaé Ahamada Chanfi	Democratic Rally of the Comoros	1,754	17.87	4,218	44.90
Ali Mohamed Ali	Independent	1,708	17.40		
Youssouf Boina	Union for the Development of the Comoros	1,157	11.78		
Ahamada Mahamoudou	Djawabu Party	947	9.65		
Said Hassane Abderemane	Juwa Party	588	5.99		
Said Omar Said Hassane	Independent	547	5.57		
Ben Abdullah Youssouf	Party for the Comorian Agreement	259	2.64		
Ahmed Mohamed	Orange Party	258	2.63		
Idi Bacar Ali	Democratic Front	255	2.60		
Kamardine Mbamidine	Independent	216	2.20		
Total		9,818	100.00	9,395	100.00
Valid votes		9,818	93.11	9,395	92.65
Invalid/blank votes		727	6.89	745	7.35
Total votes		10,545	100.00	10,140	100.00
Registered voters/turnout		12,250	86.08	12,250	82.78

Nº18 Itsandra North
Candidate	Party	First round		Second round	
Candidate	Party	Votes	%	Votes	%
M'madi Hassani Oumouri	Democratic Rally of the Comoros	2,751	33.35	4,291	51.74
Soulé Ahamada	Union for the Development of the Comoros	1,575	19.09	4,003	48.26
Mgomri Hassane	Movement for the Republic, Openness, and Unity of the Comoros Archipelago	973	11.80		
Ibrahim Mohamed	Orange Party	864	10.47		
El-Aziz Ben Ahmed	Convention for the Renewal of the Comoros	861	10.44		
Athoumani Hassane Ali	Juwa Party	657	7.96		
Mohamed Ahamada	Party for the Comorian Agreement	305	3.70		
Oussini Ali Adam	Independent	263	3.19		
Total		8,249	100.00	8,294	100.00
Valid votes		8,249	92.26	8,294	92.26
Invalid/blank votes		692	7.74	696	7.74
Total votes		8,941	100.00	8,990	100.00
Registered voters/turnout		11,092	80.61	11,092	81.05

Nº19 Itsandra South
Candidate	Party	First round		Second round	
Candidate	Party	Votes	%	Votes	%
Said Ibrahim Fahmi	Party for the Comorian Agreement	2,086	32.29	3,262	50.08
Hassani Soilihi Hamadi	Democratic Rally of the Comoros	1,838	28.45	3,252	49.92
Bahassane Ahmed Said	Independent	1,084	16.78		
Hassane Abdou M'sa	Independent	335	5.18		
Mohamed Abdou Hassane	Comorian Union for Progress	329	5.09		
Youssouf Hassani	Independent	324	5.01		
Chakira Maliki	Convention for the Renewal of the Comoros	260	4.02		
Hassane Mohamed Ali	Orange Party	205	3.17		
Total		6,461	100.00	6,514	100.00
Valid votes		6,461	92.05	6,514	93.54
Invalid/blank votes		558	7.95	450	6.46
Total votes		7,019	100.00	6,964	100.00
Registered voters/turnout		9,806	71.58	8,452	82.39

Nº20 Mitsamiouli-Mboude
Candidate	Party	First round		Second round	
Candidate	Party	Votes	%	Votes	%
Ali Ahamada	RADHI	4,198	23.80	8,615	50.13
Mohamed Abdou Mhadjou	Democratic Rally of the Comoros	3,741	21.21	8,571	49.87
El-Anrif Said Hassane	Union for the Development of the Comoros	3,513	19.91		
Djaffar Mohamed Ahmed Mansoib	Juwa Party	1,806	10.24		
Nasser-Edine Ali Amani	Comorian Union for Progress	1,059	6.00		
Soilihi Mohamed	Independent	871	4.94		
Mohamed Farouk Mhadjou	Orange Party	864	4.90		
Ahmed Mohamed Ahmed	National Rally for Development–Renewal	665	3.77		
Ahmed Mzembaba	Convention for the Renewal of the Comoros	593	3.36		
Ahmed Ali	Movement for the Republic, Openness, and Unity of the Comoros Archipelago	331	1.88		
Total		17,641	100.00	17,186	100.00
Valid votes		17,641	92.00	17,186	93.05
Invalid/blank votes		1,535	8.00	1,283	6.95
Total votes		19,176	100.00	18,469	100.00
Registered voters/turnout		23,162	82.79	22,746	81.20

Nº21 Hambou
Candidate	Party	First round		Second round	
Candidate	Party	Votes	%	Votes	%
Raoul Yvon Delapeyre	Democratic Rally of the Comoros	1,861	24.81	3,629	48.57
Ali Mhadji	Convention for the Renewal of the Comoros	1,514	20.19	3,842	51.43
Mchami Msaidié	Juwa Party	1,479	19.72		
Bacar Assoumani	Union for the Development of the Comoros	599	7.99		
Toihire Ibrahima	Independent	553	7.37		
Djounaid Moussa	National Alliance for the Comoros	422	5.63		
Boinahidy Abdallah	Orange Party	300	4.00		
Abdulwahab Ali Aziri	National Union for Democracy in the Comoros	288	3.84		
Ahamada Tadjiri	Islands' Fraternity and Unity Party	277	3.69		
Youssouf Saidou Idjihadi	Independent	207	2.76		
Total		7,500	100.00	7,471	100.00
Valid votes		7,500	92.63	7,471	93.26
Invalid/blank votes		597	7.37	540	6.74
Total votes		8,097	100.00	8,011	100.00
Registered voters/turnout		9,872	82.02	9,872	81.15

Nº22 Hamahamet-Mboinkou
Candidate	Party	First round		Second round	
Candidate	Party	Votes	%	Votes	%
Soulaimane Mohamed Solihi	Union for the Development of the Comoros	3,333	28.19	5,994	53.47
Ahamada Ali Karani	Convention for the Renewal of the Comoros	1,734	14.67	5,215	46.53
Mohamed Ranfiou	Democratic Rally of the Comoros	1,135	9.60		
Ibrahim Himidi Mohamed	RADHI	1,125	9.51		
Mohamed Taki Karim	National Union for Democracy in the Comoros	1,044	8.83		
Hamidou Bachirou	Independent	1,004	8.49		
Assoumani Ibrahimou	Juwa Party	704	5.95		
Fessoil Said Mdahoma	Independent	523	4.42		
Ibrahim Ahmed	Independent	367	3.10		
Mohamed Said Mfoihaya	Independent	359	3.04		
Amini Said Halidi	National Alliance for the Comoros	253	2.14		
Said Hassane Charifou Abdou	Independent	243	2.06		
Total		11,824	100.00	11,209	100.00
Valid votes		11,824	93.49	11,209	89.61
Invalid/blank votes		824	6.51	1,299	10.39
Total votes		12,648	100.00	12,508	100.00
Registered voters/turnout		15,020	84.21	15,020	83.28

Nº23 Ngouengwe
Candidate	Party	First round		Second round	
Candidate	Party	Votes	%	Votes	%
Abdoulkarim Mohamed	Union for the Development of the Comoros	2,031	22.44	4,265	51.34
Ali Said	Juwa Party	1,645	18.18	4,043	48.66
Ibrahim Ali Mzimba	Independent	1,570	17.35		
Ahmed Ali Abdillah	Rally for Democracy and Renewal	1,109	12.26		
Mmadi Kapachia	Convention for the Renewal of the Comoros	781	8.63		
Afane Mohamed	Orange Party	743	8.21		
Hatime Nakib	Independent	693	7.66		
Said Mohamed Said	National Alliance for the Comoros	195	2.15		
Mohamed Farar-Eddine Mondy	Mwashiwa Party	170	1.88		
Solihi Mohamed	MCJC	112	1.24		
Total		9,049	100.00	8,308	100.00
Valid votes		9,049	93.76	8,308	90.54
Invalid/blank votes		602	6.24	868	9.46
Total votes		9,651	100.00	9,176	100.00
Registered voters/turnout		12,575	76.75	12,575	72.97

Nº24 Itsahidi
Candidate	Party	First round		Second round	
Candidate	Party	Votes	%	Votes	%
Hadjira Oumouri	Democratic Rally of the Comoros	2,350	27.45	5,343	64.91
Idi Iboina M'boreha	Convention for the Renewal of the Comoros	1,036	12.10	2,889	35.09
Mohamed Abdallah	Orange Party	983	11.48		
Ibrahim Ben Abdelfatah	Rally for a Development Initiative with an Enlightened Youth	810	9.46		
Moumine Moussa Abdallah	RADHI	754	8.81		
Mdziani Mfoihaya Moindze	Juwa Party	540	6.31		
Moussa Mohamed Kaiva	Independent	527	6.16		
Abdou Youssouf Mchindra	Independent	473	5.52		
Andhoume-Dine Mahamoud	Independent	455	5.31		
Abdouroihamane Sinani	ADD ZAM-ZAM	406	4.74		
Said Soilihi Said Abdillah Ahmed	Party for the Comorian Agreement	228	2.66		
Total		8,562	100.00	8,232	100.00
Valid votes		8,562	89.27	8,232	88.66
Invalid/blank votes		1,029	10.73	1,053	11.34
Total votes		9,591	100.00	9,285	100.00
Registered voters/turnout		12,576	76.26	12,576	73.83
