= Politics of the Comoros =

Overview of Comorian politics

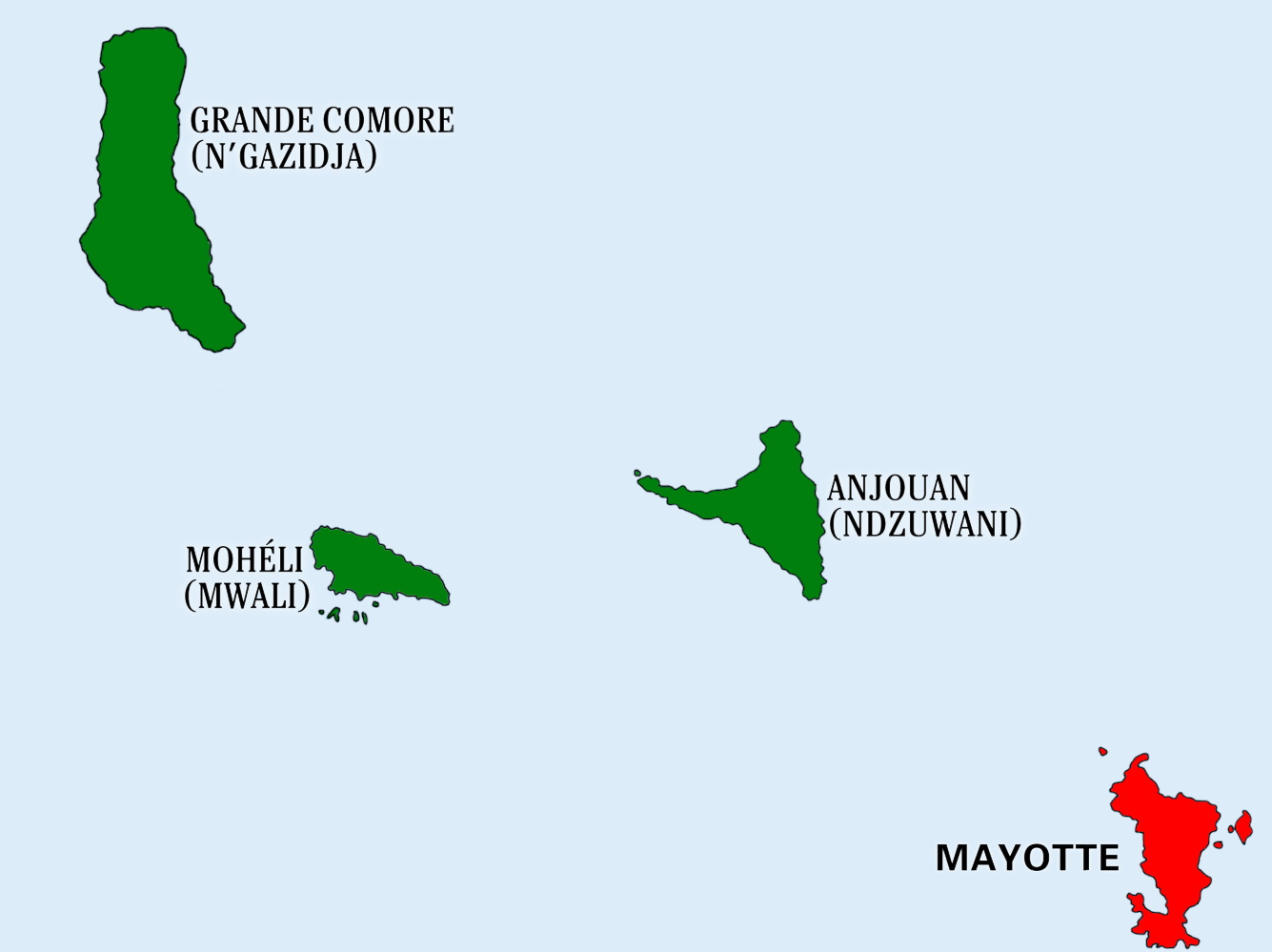
Islands of the Union of the Comoros: Njazidja, Mwali (Moheli), and Nzwani (Anjouan)

The politics of the Union of the Comoros take place in a framework of a federal presidential republic, whereby the President of the Comoros is both head of state and head of government, and of a multi-party system. Executive power is exercised by the government. Legislative power is vested in both the government and parliament. The precolonial legacies of the sultanates linger while the political situation in Comoros has been extremely fluid since the country's independence in 1975, subject to the volatility of coups and political insurrection.

The first multi-party elections in Comoros were the 1990 presidential election and 1992 parliamentary election.

As of 2008, the Comoros and Mauritania were considered by US-based organization Freedom House as the only real “electoral democracies” of the Arab world. Since then, Comoros has experienced democratic backsliding and is only considered to be partially free, while elections are no longer considered free or fair.

== Precolonial and colonial political structures ==
Sultanates in the late nineteenth century used a cyclic age system and hierarchical lineage membership to provide the foundation for participation in the political process. In the capital, "the sultan was assisted by his ministers and by a madjelis, an advisory council composed of elders, whom he consulted regularly". Apart from local administration, the age system was used to include the population in decision making, depending on the scope of the decision being made. For example, the elders of the island of Njazidja held considerable influence on the authority of the sultan. Though sultanates granted rights to their free inhabitants, were provided with warriors during war and taxed the towns under their authority, their definition as a state is open to debate. The islands' incorporation as a province of the colony of Madagascar into the French colonial empire marked the end of the sultanates.

Despite French colonization, Comorans identify first with kinship or regional ties and rarely ever with the central government. This is a lingering effect of the sovereign sultanates of pre-colonial times. French colonial administration was based on a misconception that the sultanates operated as absolute monarchs: district boundaries were the same as the sultanates', multiple new taxes forced men into wage labor on colonial plantations and was reinforced through a compulsory public labor system that had little effect on infrastructure. French policy was hampered by an absence of settlers, effective communication across islands, rough geographical terrain and hostility towards the colonial government. Policies were made to apply to Madagascar as a whole and seldom to the nuances of each province: civil servants were typically Christian, unaware of local customs and unable to speak the local language. The French established the Ouatou Akouba in 1915, a local form of governance based on "customary structures" already in place that attempted to model itself after the age system in place under the sultanates. Their understanding of the elders' council as a corporate group bypassed the reality that there were men "who had accomplished the necessary customary rituals to be accorded the status of elder and thus be eligible to participate in the political process in the village", which effectively rendered the French elders' council ineffective. Though the Ouatou Akouba was disbanded, it resulted in the consolidation and formalization of the age system as access to power in the customary and local government spheres. The French failure to establish a functioning state in the Comoros has had repercussions in the post-independence era.

== Post-independence ==
At independence there were five main political parties: OUDZIMA, UMMA, the Comoro People's Democratic Rally, the Comoro National Liberation Movement and the Socialist Objective Party. The political groups previously known simply as the 'green' and 'white' party became the Rassemblement Démocratique du Peuple Comorien (RDPC) and the Union Démocratique des Comores (UDC), headed by Sayyid Muhammad Cheikh and Sayyid Ibrahim. Members from both parties later merged to form OUDZIMA under the leadership of first president Ahmad Abdallah while dissidents from both created UMMA under the leadership of future president Ali Soilih.

Prince Said Ibrahim took power in 1970 but was democratically elected out of office in 1972 in favor of former French senator Ahmed Abdallah. President Abdallah declared independence for all islands, except Mayotte which remained under French administration, in 1975. The threat of renewed socioeconomic marginalization following the transfer of the capital to Ngazidja in 1962, more than social or cultural differences, underlay the island's subsequent rejection of independence. France withdrew all economic and technical support for the now independent state, which would encourage a revolutionary regime under future president Ali Soilih. French military and financial aid to mercenaries brought Prince Said Mohammed Jaffar to power after the United National Front of the Comoros (FNU) party toppled Abdallah's government. This mercenary coup was unique in that, unlike other coups on the continent, it was "uninspired by any ideological convictions". The Jaffar regime's inefficient distribution of resources and poor mismanagement was shown through the expulsion of French civil servants as well as endemic unemployment and food shortages. The regime used famine as "an opportunity to switch food patronage from France to the World Food Programme's emergency aid".

President Jaffar's ousting by Minister of Defense and Justice, Ali Soilih, brought about the "periode noire" (dark period) of the country; the voting age was lowered to 14, most civil servants were dismissed and there was a ban on some Islamic customs. He implemented revolutionary social reforms such as replacing French with Shikomoro, burning down the national archives and nationalizing land. His government received support from Egypt, Iraq, and the Sudan. Soilih's attacks on religious and customary authority contributed to his eventual ousting through a French-backed coup consisting of mercenaries and ex-politicians who together formed the Politico Military Doctorate.

Abdallah was reinstated and constructed a mercantile state by resuscitating the structures of the colonial era. His establishment of a one party state and intolerance for dissent further alienated civil society from the state. In May 1978 the Comoros were renamed the Islamic Republic of the Comoros and continued strengthening ties with the Arab world which resulted in their joining the Arab League. Abdallah's government sought to reverse Soilih's 'de-sacralization' by re-introducing the grand marriage, declaring Arabic the second official language behind French, and creating the office of the Grand Mufti. The doctorate & compromise government was dissolved, constitutional changes removed succession from a politician and neutralized the post of another possible challenger in abolishing the position of prime minister, which effectively cemented a client-patron network by making the civil service position dependent on Abdallah's political base. The Democratic Front's (DF) internal opposition to Abdallah was suppressed through the incarceration of over 600 people allegedly involved in a failed coup attempt. Abdallah then stocked the House of Assembly with loyal clientelist supporters through rigged parliamentary elections. All of these actions effectively consolidated Abdallah's position.

Muhammed Djohar succeeded president Abdallah after his assassination in 1989 but was evacuated by French troops after a failed coup attempt in 1996. The Comoros were led by Muhammed Taki Abd al-Karim beginning in 1996 and he was followed by interim president Said Massunde who eventually gave way to Assoumani Azali. Taki's lack of Arab heritage led to his lack of understanding Nzwani's cultural differences and economic problems, as seen by the establishment of the elders council with only loyal Taki supporters. As a result, the council was ignored by the true elders of the island. After Taki's death, a military coup in 1999, the nation's eighteenth since independence in 1975, installed Azali in to power. Colonel Azali Assoumani seized power in a bloodless coup in April 1999, overthrowing Interim President Tadjidine Ben Said Massounde, who himself had held the office since the death of democratically elected President Mohamed Taki Abdoulkarim in November, 1998. In May 1999, Azali decreed a constitution that gave him both executive and legislative powers. Bowing somewhat to international criticism, Azali appointed a civilian Prime Minister, Bainrifi Tarmidi, in December 1999; however, Azali retained the mantle of Head of State and army Commander. In December 2000, Azali named a new civilian Prime Minister, Hamada Madi, and formed a new civilian Cabinet. When Azali took power he also pledged to step down in April 2000 and relinquish control to a democratically elected president—a pledge with mixed results. Under Mohammed Taki and Assoumani Azali, access to the state was used to support client networks which led to crumbling infrastructure that cultivated in the islands of Nzwani and Mwali declaring independence only to be stopped by French troops. Azali lacked the social obligations required to address the elders and when combined with his gross mismanagement and increasing economic and social dependence on foreign entities, made managing daily life near nonexistent in the state. Therefore, local administrative structures began popping up and drifting away from reliance on the state, funded by remittances from the expatriate community in France.

Azali Assoumani is a former army officer, first came to power in a coup in 1999. Then he won presidency in 2002 election, having power until 2006. After ten years, he was elected again in 2016 election. In March 2019, he was re-elected in the elections opposition claimed to be full of irregularities.

Before the 2019 election, president Azali Assoumani had arranged a constitutional referendum in 2018 that approved extending the presidential mandate from one five-year term to two. The opposition had boycotted the referendum.

In January 2020, his party the Convention for the Renewal of the Comoros (CRC) won 20 out of 24 parliamentary seats in the parliamentary election.

On 18 February 2023 the Comoros assumed the presidency of the African Union. In January 2024, President Azali Assoumani was re-elected with 63% of the vote in the disputed presidential election.

The Comoros Islands have experienced five different constitutions.

== First Constitution: Federal Islamic Republic of the Comoros, 1978-1989 ==
- No parliamentary or popular participation
- Intended to provide unity and promote economic growth.
- Islands were known as governorates, independent entities with Island Council's and elected governor's that served four year terms, appointed commissioners, and handled the financial and social matters of the island.
- Offices at the national level and positions of central government were divided among the three islands. Under this constitution, the unicameral government did not represent the islands in a chamber and gave the governors and federal government authority over the islands.
- Issues under this constitution included an uneven distribution of resources between governorates and the federal government which lead to limited autonomy in the independent management of each island. Foreign aid required approval of the federal executive, further exacerbating this issue.
- Revised in 1983, 1984, and 1989 which resulted in the elimination of the Prime Minister position.

== Second Constitution: Federal Islamic Republic of the Comoros, 1992 - 1999 ==
- Consulted civil society and political parties. Governors and Island Council's now elected for five year terms, with the latter in charge of the island's finances.
- Between 30 and 40% of taxes went to the federal budget with the rest proportionately divided among the islands.
- The Central government was in charge of the armed forces and national policies and could be terminated through a vote of non-confidence in the Federal Assembly, whose members were elected for four years.
- This constitution created a Senate of equal representation for the islands where members were elected for six year terms and could collectively challenge policy passed by the Federal Assembly.
- The Constitutional Council oversaw elections and the constitutionality of proceedings in the islands.
- The Council of Ulenma promoted Islam.
- Judicial power was independent from the executive and legislative branches.

== Third Constitution: The Union of the Comoros, 2001 ==
- Federal Assembly dissolved
- President of the Union elected to five year terms and appoints Prime Minister to serve as head of government.
- President Azali did not elect a head of government and thus was both the head of the state and government. The executive is known as the council of ministers and appointed by the president with each island having their own presidents.
- Senate replaced with Assembly of the Union – 30 seats and five year terms.
- Created a supreme court that was elected by the president, the Assembly of the Union, and the assembly of each island.

== Fourth Constitution ==
In a separate nod to pressure to restore civilian rule, the government organized several committees to compose a new constitution, including the August 2000 National Congress and November 2000 Tripartite Commission. The opposition parties initially refused to participate in the Tripartite Commission, but on 17 February, representatives of the government, the Anjouan separatists, the political opposition, and civil society organizations signed a "Framework Accord for Reconciliation in Comoros," brokered by the Organization of African Unity

The accord called for the creation of a new Tripartite Commission for National Reconciliation to develop a "New Comorian Entity" with a new constitution. The new federal Constitution came into effect in 2002; it included elements of consociationalism, including a presidency that rotates every four years among the islands and extensive autonomy for each island. Presidential elections were held in 2002, at which Azali Assoumani was elected president. In April 2004, legislative elections were held, completing the implementation of the new constitution.

The new Union of the Comoros consists of three islands: Anjouan, Grande Comore, and Mohéli. Each island has a president, who shares the presidency of the Union on a rotating basis. The president and his vice-presidents are elected for a term of four years. The constitution states that, "the islands enjoy financial autonomy, freely draw up and manage their budgets".

President Assoumani Azali of Grande Comore is the first Union president. President Mohamed Bacar of Anjouan formed his 13-member government at the end of April, 2003.

On 15 May 2006, Ahmed Abdallah Sambi, a cleric and successful businessman educated in Iran, Saudi Arabia, and the Sudan, was declared the winner of elections for President of the Republic. He is considered a moderate Islamist and is called Ayatollah by his supporters. He beat out retired French air force officer Mohamed Djaanfari and long-time politician Ibrahim Halidi, whose candidacy was backed by Azali Assoumani, the outgoing president.

A referendum took place on May 16, 2009, to decide whether to cut down the government's unwieldy political bureaucracy. 52.7% of those eligible voted, and 93.8% of votes were cast in approval of the referendum. The referendum would cause each island's president to become a governor and the ministers to become councilors.

== Autonomous islands ==
The constitution gives Anjouan, Grande Comore, and Mohéli the right to govern most of their internal affairs with their own presidents, except the powers assigned to the Union of the Comoros such as banking, foreign affairs, national security, nationalities, and others. Comoros considers Mayotte, an overseas department and region of France, to be a part of its sovereign territory, with an autonomous status.

As of 2011, the three autonomous islands are subdivided into 16 prefectures, 54 communes, and 318 villes or villages.

== Executive branch ==
Main office-holders
Office	Name	Party	Since
President	Azali Assoumani		26 May 2016

The federal presidency is rotated between the islands' presidents.

The Union of the Comoros abolished the position of Prime Minister in 2002. The position of Vice-President of the Comoros was used 2002–2019.

== Legislative branch ==
The Assembly of the Union has 33 seats, 24 elected in single seat constituencies and 9 representatives of the regional assemblies.

== Judicial branch ==
The Supreme Court or Cour Supreme, has two members appointed by the president, two members elected by the Federal Assembly, one by the Council of each island, and former presidents of the republic.

== International organization participation ==
The Comoros is a member state of the following international organizations:

- African Development Bank (AfDB)
- African Union (AU)
- Agence de Coopération Culturelle et Technique (ACCT)
- Arab Monetary Fund (AMF)
- Food and Agriculture Organization (FAO)
- Group of 77 (G77)
- Indian Ocean Commission (IOC)
- International Bank for Reconstruction and Development (IBRD)
- International Civil Aviation Organization (ICAO)
- International Criminal Court (ICC) – signatory
- International Criminal Police Organization – INTERPOL (ICPO–INTERPOL)
- International Development Association (IDA)
- International Federation of Red Cross and Red Crescent Societies (IFRC)
- International Finance Corporation (IFC)
- International Fund for Agricultural Development (IFAD)
- International Labour Organization (ILO)
- International Monetary Fund (IMF)
- International Olympic Committee (IOC)
- International Red Cross and Red Crescent Movement (ICRM)
- International Telecommunication Union (ITU)
- Islamic Development Bank (IDB)
- League of Arab States (LAS)
- Non-Aligned Movement (NAM)
- Organisation for the Prohibition of Chemical Weapons (OPCW) – signatory
- Organisation of African, Caribbean and Pacific States (ACP)
- Organisation of Islamic Cooperation (OIC)
- UN Trade and Development (UNCTAD)
- United Nations (UN)
- United Nations Educational, Scientific and Cultural Organization (UNESCO)
- United Nations Industrial Development Organization (UNIDO)
- Universal Postal Union (UPU)
- World Customs Organization (WCO)
- World Health Organization (WHO)
- World Meteorological Organization (WMO)

== See also ==
- ISO 3166-2:KM
