= 2024 Comorian presidential election =

Second re-election of Azali Assoumani

- 14 January 2024
- Turnout: 56.44%
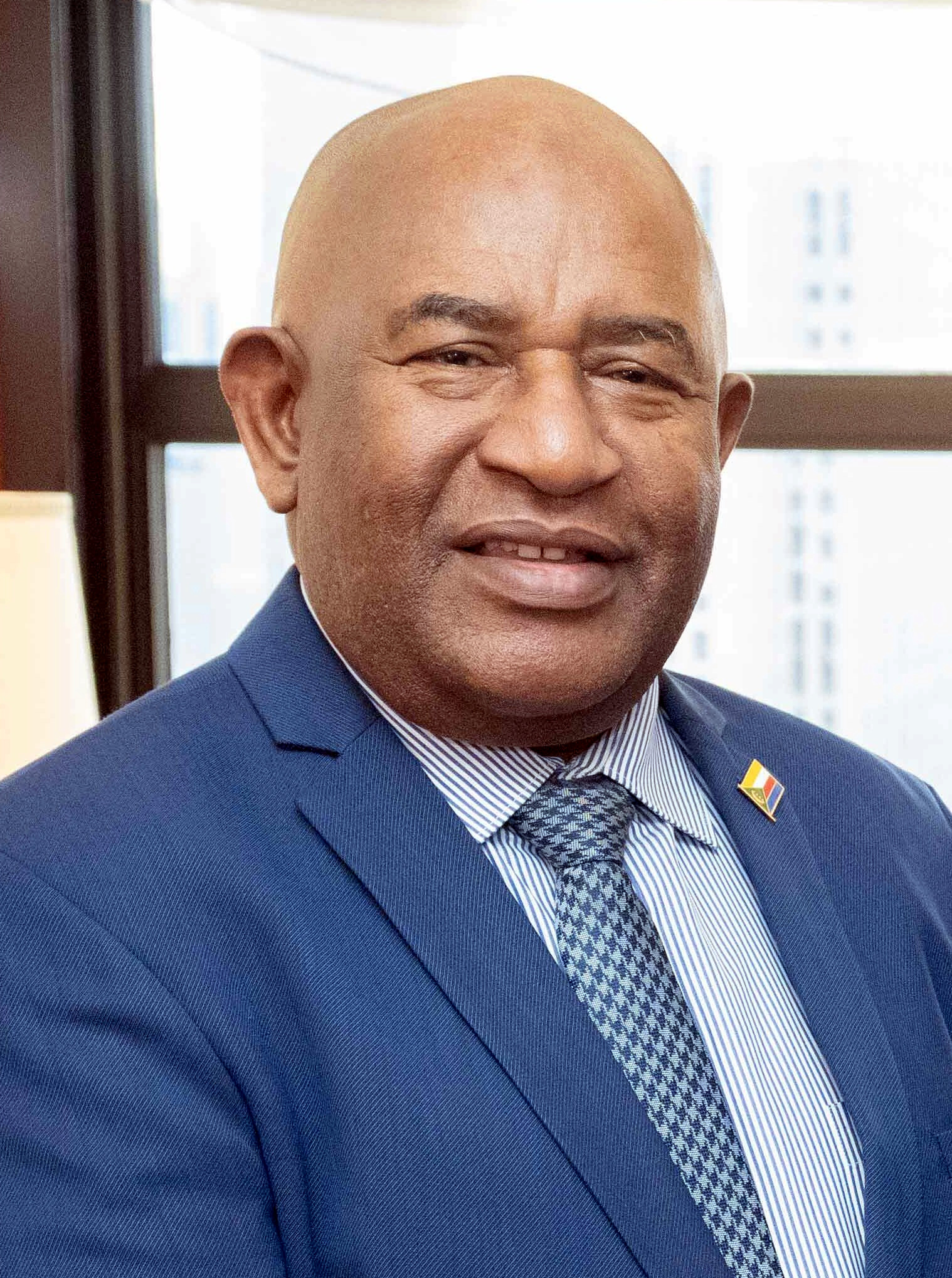

Candidate	Azali Assoumani	Salim Issa Abdillah	Mohamed Daoudou
Party	CRC	Juwa	Orange
Popular vote	99,541	19,325	17,854
Percentage	57.02%	11.07%	10.23%
Candidate	Bourhane Hamidou	Mouigni Baraka
Party	Independent	RDC
Popular vote	17,569	17,497
Percentage	10.06%	10.02%
President before election
Azali Assoumani
CRC
Elected President
Azali Assoumani
CRC

Presidential elections were held in the Comoros on 14 January 2024. Election officials initially announced on 16 January that incumbent president Azali Assoumani had been re-elected with 63% of the vote, with a voter turnout of just 16%. However, the Supreme Court approved a set of results that showed Assoumani receiving 57% of the vote, with voter turnout at 56%.

== Background ==
The election was viewed as a referendum on the presidency of Azali Assoumani, who faced opposition from five other candidates. Opposition candidates pledged to unite behind a single candidate should no candidate reach a majority of the vote in the 14 January election, which would trigger a runoff election on 25 February. The opposition candidates shared the slogan "Azali Nalawe" ("Azali, get out"). Ten days before campaigning began, Harimia Ahmed, the senior Supreme Court magistrate responsible for monitoring the elections, was dismissed through a decree by Assoumani.

Assoumani campaigned on the slogan "Gwa Ndzima" ("knock out in one go"), signaling his intent to win an outright majority in the first round. He pledged to continue his ongoing projects such as increased infrastructure, turning the country into a tourist destination and raising Comoros' international profile through his assumption of the rotating presidency of the African Union. He also blamed the "coronavirus crisis" for adversely affecting his track record.

== Electoral system ==
Until 2018, the presidency of the Comoros rotated between the country's three main islands: Anjouan, Grande Comore and Mohéli. The 2010 elections were limited to Mohélian candidates and the 2016 elections, which were tainted by violence and allegations of irregularities, saw candidates from Grande Comore contest the elections. The next presidential election would have seen a president elected from Anjouan.

However, a constitutional referendum in July 2018 saw voters approve constitutional amendments that scrapped the rotation system and instituted a standard two-round system in which a candidate has to receive a majority of the vote in the first round to be elected, with a second round held if no candidate is able to win in the first round. The changes also moved the next presidential elections forward to 2019 and allowed incumbent President Azali Assoumani to run for another term.

The referendum led to violent protests and an armed uprising in Anjouan in October 2018, which was stopped by the military after several days.

== Results ==
On 16 January 2024 Idrissa Said Ben Ahmada, the head of the Comorian election commission, announced that Assoumani had received 63% of the vote, precluding a run-off. His nearest rival, Salim Issa Abdillah, received 20%. However, the commission noted that only 55,258 voters had voted in the presidential election, which was boycotted by some opposition candidates, a turnout of just 16%. The commission also said that 189,497 voters voted in the concurrent gubernatorial elections for each of the country's three islands.

The Supreme Court validated the election results on 24 January. However, the body provided different figures from the results released by the electoral commission, saying that Assoumani had won the election with 57.2% of the vote, and putting turnout in the presidential vote at 56%, or equivalent to 191,297 voters.

Candidate	Party	Votes	%
Azali Assoumani	Convention for the Renewal of the Comoros	99,541	57.02
Salim Issa Abdillah	Juwa Party	19,325	11.07
Mohamed Daoudou	Orange Party	17,854	10.23
Bourhane Hamidou	Independent	17,569	10.06
Mouigni Baraka	Democratic Rally of the Comoros	17,497	10.02
Aboudou Soefou	TSASI	2,796	1.60
Total		174,582	100.00
Valid votes		174,582	91.26
Invalid/blank votes		16,715	8.74
Total votes		191,297	100.00
Registered voters/turnout		338,940	56.44
Source: CENI

== Aftermath ==
At a gathering of his supporters, Assoumani called his reelection "a strong moment for our country, which is doing everything in its power to consolidate democracy." However, his opponents called for the results to be annulled, alleging that electoral irregularities and fraud such as irregularities in the lists of precinct members, ballot-stuffing, early closure of polling stations had occurred and disruptions of voting by soldiers had occurred, and noted that two-thirds of the electorate had turned out to vote for governors of the islands. Salim Issa Adillah, the second-placer in the vote, warned that the opposition had "an action plan that we will roll out at the right moment". Despite the opposition's claims, international observers said the election was carried out in a free and fair way with "peace and tranquility".

=== Post-election protests and violence ===
On 17 and 18 January, violent protests broke out in the capital Moroni following the announcement of Assoumani's victory, with demonstrators ransacking and burning a former minister's residence, setting the car of an incumbent minister on fire, looting the national food depot and blocking roads. Police responded by firing tear gas and making arrests, with reports that security forces opened fire on a women's march. Authorities subsequently declared a nighttime curfew from 10 pm until 6 am on 18 January, although the curfew was implemented at 7 pm in Moroni, Bambao, and Itsandra. A government spokesman accused the opposition of organising the protests, while opposition candidate Mohamed Daoudou expressed solidarity with what he called a "spontaneous movement". At least one person was reported to have been killed and at least 25 others, including a seven-year-old child, were injured. One of the injured was described as in serious condition. Internet access was also severely disrupted.

Reacting to the violence, Volker Türk, the United Nations High Commissioner for Human Rights, urged Comoran authorities to "ensure a safe environment, where all Comorans, including members of the political opposition, can freely express their views and exercise their right to peaceful assembly," as well as to release arbitrary detainees, investigate human rights violations in the pre-election period and bring the perpetrators to justice. The US embassy said that the official election results "raised serious concerns that must be addressed to maintain the peace and the well-being of the nation", and called on the electoral commission and Comorian authorities "to ensure full transparency and clarify the results it announced."

All five opposition candidates called for a national day of protest against the election results to be held on 19 January, which went unheeded.

On 20 January, Mohamed Daoudou, who claimed to have "proof" of fraud, filed an appeal with the Supreme Court to request the annulment of the election results and the holding of new elections. However, on 24 January, the Supreme Court dismissed the case along with other such lawsuits coinciding with its validation of the election results.

== Reactions ==
China congratulated Assoumani on his victory.
