= History of the Comoros =

The history of the Comoros extends back to about 800–1000 AD when the archipelago was first inhabited. The Comoros have been inhabited by various groups and sultanates throughout this time. France colonised the islands in the 19th century, and they became independent in 1975.

== Prehistory ==
The Comoros archipelago, of volcanic origin, was formed during the Cenozoic era. Seismic reflection data acquired during the SISMAORE survey indicate that Mayotte is the oldest edifice, with volcanism starting around 26.5 Ma; at the other end, Grande Comore remains active, dominated by Mount Karthala and a recent tectono-volcanic field identified offshore around the archipelago.

Before the first human settlements, the archipelago likely had no native terrestrial mammals, apart from fruit bats of the genus Pteropus and other chiropterans, natural colonizers of oceanic islands.

== Early settlement and migrations ==
Genetic studies based on uniparental markers indicate that the Comorian population has a tri-continental ancestry—African, Island Southeast Asian, and Middle Eastern—resulting from early admixture events that began during the first millennium CE.

=== Austronesian settlement (8th–13th centuries CE) ===
Multiple lines of evidence suggest that the Comoros were initially settled by Austronesian-speaking sailors, probably from Island Southeast Asia, between the 8th and 13th centuries CE, in parallel with the colonisation of Madagascar.

Archaeobotanical findings from early sites such as Sima (Anjouan) show Asian crops including rice (indica and japonica), mung bean and cotton predominating over African staples, supporting an Island Southeast Asian origin.

Genome-wide analyses identify an Austronesian genetic contribution of around 20 percent in Comorian populations, with variation between islands.

Chronological dispersal of Austronesian peoples across the Indo-Pacific

=== Dembeni phase and early Islam (9th–12th centuries) ===
Archaeology identifies a Dembeni cultural horizon (Mayotte and neighboring islands) with multiple sites (9th–10th and 11th–12th centuries) engaged in long-distance Indian Ocean trade. Finds include early Chinese and Persian ceramics and abundant Malagasy rock crystal, indicating wealth and integration into Abbasid then Fatimid trade circuits; funerary evidence (Mecca-oriented burials) points to early Islamisation by the 11th–12th centuries.

=== Bantu–Swahili integrations and regional networks (late 1st millennium onward) ===
From the late first millennium, Bantu-speaking groups from the East African coast settled and intermingled with earlier Austronesian settlers, embedding the islands within Swahili cultural and commercial networks across the western Indian Ocean.

=== Shirazi and Hadhrami influences (15th–16th centuries) ===
By the 15th century, Persian-Gulf–linked Shirazi elites and merchants established ports and ruling houses, consolidating Comorian links to the Swahili corridor; in the 16th century, Hadhrami lineages reinforced these dynasties through kinship and religious authority. Over the centuries, the Comoros have been settled by a succession of diverse groups from the coast of Africa, the Persian Gulf, Southeast Asia and Madagascar.

== European contact and expansion ==
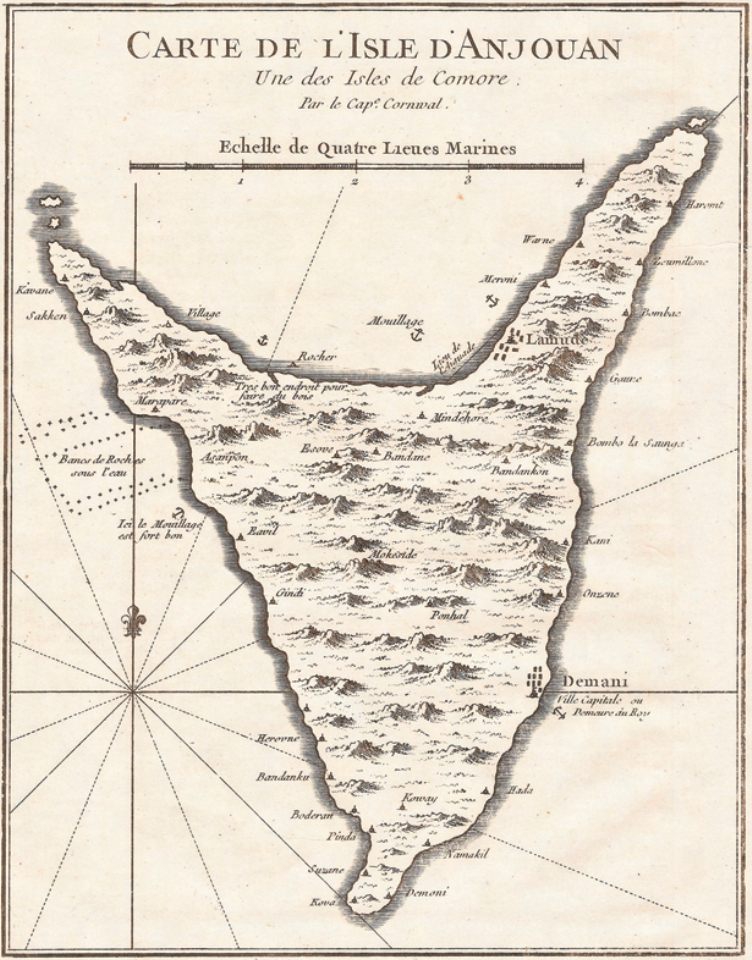
Map of Anjouan (1748) by French hydrographer Jacques Nicolas Bellin

Portuguese explorers first visited the archipelago in 1505.

Apart from a visit by the French Parmentier brothers in 1529, for much of the 16th century the only Europeans to visit the islands were Portuguese. British and Dutch ships began arriving around the start of the 17th century and the island of Ndzwani soon became a major supply point on the route to the East Indies. Ndzwani was generally ruled by a single sultan, who occasionally attempted to extend his authority to Mayotte and Mwali; Ngazidja was more fragmented, on occasion being divided into as many as 12 small kingdoms.

Sir James Lancaster's voyage to the Indian Ocean in 1591 was the first attempt by the English to break into the spice trade, which was dominated by the Portuguese. Only one of his four ships made it back from the Indies on that voyage, and that one with a decimated crew of 5 men and a boy. Lancaster himself was marooned by a cyclone on the Comoros. Many of his crew were speared to death by angry islanders although Lancaster found his way home in 1594. (Dalrymple W. 2019; Bloomsbury Publishing ISBN 1635573955).

Both the British and the French turned their attention to the Comoros islands in the middle of the 19th century. The French finally acquired the islands through a cunning mixture of strategies, including the policy of "divide and conquer", chequebook politics and a serendipitous affair between a sultana and a French trader that was put to good use by the French, who kept control of the islands, quelling unrest and the occasional uprising.

William Sunley, a planter and British Consul from 1848 to 1866, was an influence on Anjouan.

== French Comoros ==
France's presence in the western Indian Ocean dates to the early 17th century. The French established a settlement in southern Madagascar in 1634 and occupied the islands of Réunion and Rodrigues; in 1715 France claimed Mauritius (Île de France), and in 1756 Seychelles. When France ceded Mauritius, Rodrigues, and Seychelles to Britain in 1814, it lost its Indian Ocean ports; Reunion, which remained French, did not offer a suitable natural harbor. In 1840 France acquired the island of Nosy-Be off the northwestern coast of Madagascar, but its potential as a port was limited. In 1841 the governor of Reunion, Admiral de Hell, negotiated with Andrian Souli, the Malagasy ruler of Mayotte, to cede Mayotte to France. Mahore offered a suitable site for port facilities, and its acquisition was justified by de Hell on the grounds that if France did not act, Britain would occupy the island.

Although France had established a foothold in Comoros, the acquisition of the other islands proceeded fitfully. At times the French were spurred on by the threat of British intervention, especially on Nzwani, and at other times, by the constant anarchy resulting from the sultans' wars upon each other. In the 1880s, Germany's growing influence on the East African coast added to the concerns of the French. Not until 1908, however, did the four Comoro Islands become part of France's colony of Madagascar and not until 1912 did the last sultan abdicate. Then, a colonial administration took over the islands and established a capital at Dzaoudzi on Mahore. Treaties of protectorate status marked a transition point between independence and annexation; such treaties were signed with the rulers of Njazidja, Nzwani, and Mwali in 1886.

The effects of French colonialism were mixed, at best. Colonial rule brought an end to the institution of Slavery in the Comoros, but economic and social differences between former slaves and free persons and their descendants persisted. Health standards improved with the introduction of modern medicine, and the population increased about 50 percent between 1900 and 1960. France continued to dominate the economy. Food crop cultivation was neglected as French sociétés (companies) established cash crop plantations in the coastal regions. The result was an economy dependent on the exporting of vanilla, ylang-ylang, cloves, cocoa, copra, and other tropical crops. Most profits obtained from exports were diverted to France rather than invested in the infrastructure of the islands. Development was further limited by the colonial government's practice of concentrating public services on Madagascar. One consequence of this policy was the migration of large numbers of Comorans to Madagascar, where their presence would be a long-term source of tension between Comoros and its giant island neighbor. The Shirazi elite continued to play a prominent role as large landowners and civil servants. On the eve of independence, Comoros remained poor and undeveloped, having only one secondary school and practically nothing in the way of national media. Isolated from important trade routes by the opening of the Suez Canal in 1869, having few natural resources, and largely neglected by France, the islands were poorly equipped for independence.

On September 25, 1942, British forces landed in the Comoros, occupying them until October 13, 1946.

In 1946 the Comoro Islands became an overseas department of France with representation in the French National Assembly. The following year, the islands' administrative ties to Madagascar were severed; Comoros established its own customs regime in 1952. A Governing Council was elected in August 1957 on the four islands in conformity with the loi-cadre (enabling law) of June 23, 1956. A constitution providing for internal self-government was promulgated in 1961, following a 1958 referendum in which Comorans voted overwhelmingly to remain a part of France. This government consisted of a territorial assembly having, in 1975, thirty-nine members, and a Governing Council of six to nine ministers responsible to it.

Agreement was reached with France in 1973 for the Comoros to become independent in 1978. On July 6, 1975, however, the Comorian parliament passed a resolution declaring unilateral independence as a republic. The deputies of Mayotte abstained. The first president of the Comoros, Ahmed Abdallah Abderemane, was ousted in a coup d'état by Ali Soilih, a socialist.

Soilih began with a set of solid socialist ideals designed to modernize the country. However, the regime faced problems. A French mercenary by the name of Bob Denard, arrived in the Comoros at dawn on 13 May 1978, and removed Soilih from power. Solih was shot and killed during the coup. The mercenaries returned Abdallah to power and the mercenaries were given key positions in government.

In two referendums, in December 1974 and February 1976, the population of Mayotte voted against independence from France (by 63.8% and 99.4% respectively). Mayotte thus remains under French administration, and the Comorian Government has effective control over only Grande Comore, Anjouan, and Mohéli.

Later, French settlers, French-owned companies, and Arab merchants established a plantation-based economy that now uses about one-third of the land for export crops.

== Abdallah regime ==
In 1978, president Ali Soilih, who had a firm anti-French line, was killed and Ahmed Abdallah came to power. Under the reign of Abdallah, Denard was commander of the Presidential Guard (PG) and de facto ruler of the country. He was trained, supported and funded by the white regimes in South Africa (SA) and Rhodesia (now Zimbabwe) in return for permission to set up a secret listening post on the islands. South-African agents kept an ear on the important ANC bases in Lusaka and Dar es Salaam and watched the war in Mozambique, in which SA played an active role. The Comoros were also used for the evasion of arms sanctions.

When in 1981 François Mitterrand was elected president Denard lost the support of the French intelligence service, but he managed to strengthen the link between SA and the Comoros. Besides the military, Denard established his own company SOGECOM, for both the security and construction, and seemed to profit by the arrangement. Between 1985 and 1987 the relationship of the PG with the local Comorians became worse.

At the end of the 1980s the South Africans did not wish to continue to support the mercenary regime and France was in agreement. Also President Abdallah wanted the mercenaries to leave. Their response was a (third) coup resulting in the death of President Abdallah, in which Denard and his men were probably involved. South Africa and the French government subsequently forced Denard and his mercenaries to leave the islands in 1989.

== 1989–1996 ==
Said Mohamed Djohar became president. His time in office was turbulent, including an impeachment attempt in 1991 and a coup attempt in 1992.

On September 28, 1995 Bob Denard and a group of mercenaries took over the Comoros islands in a coup (named operation Kaskari by the mercenaries) against President Djohar. France immediately and severely denounced the coup, and backed by the 1978 defense agreement with the Comoros, President Jacques Chirac ordered his special forces to retake the island. Bob Denard began to take measures to stop the coming invasion. A new presidential guard was created. Strong points armed with heavy machine guns were set up around the island, particularly around the island's two airports.

On October 3, 1995, 11 p.m., the French deployed 600 men against a force of 33 mercenaries and a 300-man dissident force. Denard however ordered his mercenaries not to fight. Within 7 hours the airports at Iconi and Hahaya and the French Embassy in Moroni were secured. By 3:00 p.m. the next day Bob Denard and his mercenaries had surrendered. This (response) operation, codenamed Azalée, was remarkable, because there were no casualties, and just in seven days, plans were drawn up and soldiers were deployed. Denard was taken to France and jailed. Prime minister Caambi El-Yachourtu became acting president until Djohar returned from exile in January, 1996. In March 1996, following presidential elections, Mohamed Taki Abdoulkarim, a member of the civilian government that Denard had tried to set up in October 1995, became president. On 23 November 1996, Ethiopian Airlines Flight 961 crashed near a beach on the island after it was hijacked and ran out of fuel killing 125 people and leaving 50 survivors.

== Secession of Anjouan and Mohéli ==
In 1997, the islands of Anjouan and Mohéli declared their independence from the Comoros. A subsequent attempt by the government to re-establish control over the rebellious islands by force failed, and presently the African Union is brokering negotiations to effect a reconciliation. This process is largely complete, at least in theory. According to some sources, Mohéli did return to government control in 1998. In 1999, Anjouan had internal conflicts and on August 1 of that year, the 80-year-old first president Foundi Abdallah Ibrahim resigned, transferring power to a national coordinator, Said Abeid. The government was overthrown in a coup by army and navy officers on August 9, 2001. Mohamed Bacar soon rose to leadership of the junta that took over and by the end of the month he was the leader of the country. Despite two coup attempts in the following three months, including one by Abeid, Bacar's government remained in power, and was apparently more willing to negotiate with the Comoros. Presidential elections were held for all of the Comoros in 2002, and presidents have been chosen for all three islands as well, which have become a confederation. Most notably, Mohammed Bacar was elected for a 5-year term as president of Anjouan. Grande Comore had experienced troubles of its own in the late 1990s, when President Taki died on November 6, 1998. Colonel Azali Assoumani became president following a military coup in 1999. There have been several coup attempts since, but he gained firm control of the country after stepping down temporarily and winning a presidential election in 2002.

In May 2006, Ahmed Abdallah Sambi was elected from the island of Anjouan to be the president of the Union of the Comoros. He is a Sunni cleric who studied in the Sudan, Iran and Saudi Arabia. He is nicknamed "Ayatollah" due to his time in Iran and his penchant for turbans. Sambi was sentenced to life in imprisonment in the Comoros passport sales scandal.

== Azali Assoumani in power since 2016 ==
Azali Assoumani is a former army officer, first came to power in a coup in 1999. Then he won presidency in 2002 election, having power until 2006. After ten years, he was elected again in 2016 election. In March 2019, he was re-elected in the elections opposition claimed to be full of irregularities.

Before the 2019 election president Azali Assoumani had arranged a constitutional referendum in 2018 that approved extending the presidential mandate from one five-year term to two. The opposition had boycotted the referendum.

In January 2020, his party The Convention for the Renewal of the Comoros (CRC) won 20 out of 24 parliamentary seats in the parliamentary election.

On 18 February 2023 the Comoros assumed the presidency of the African Union. In January 2024, President Azali Assoumani was re-elected with 63% of the vote in the disputed presidential election.

== See also ==
- List of heads of state of the Comoros
- List of heads of government of the Comoros
- History of Africa
- History of Southern Africa
- Politics of the Comoros
