= Hadjira Oumouri =

Comorian politician and midwife

Hadjira Oumouri (born 1969) is a Comorian politician and midwife. She served from 2015 to 2020 in the Assembly of the Union of the Comoros, becoming the second woman elected to the body in the country's history.

== Early life and education ==
Hadjira Oumouri was born in 1969 in Foumbouni, a town on the island of Grande Comore in the Comoros. Her father, Mze Oumouri Wa Moindze, was a prominent scholar of the history of Grande Comore.

After finishing high school, Oumouri trained as a midwife in Moroni and Mauritius.

== Career ==
=== Women's health and rights ===
Oumouri was recruited in 1995 to work in family planning for the United Nations Population Fund in the Mbadjini region of Grande Comore, eventually becoming director of the NGO ASCOBEF from 2001 to 2014.

She also became involved in women's rights activism, including through the organization L'Réseau National Femmes et Développement. She also founded the women's association Femme en Mouvement in the Mbadjini region.

=== Politics ===
The former midwife eventually became more directly involved in local politics in her commune, Itsahidi, aiming to represent women in the country's largely male-dominated political scene. She was appointed mayor of the commune from 2012 to 2014.

After seven years with the RIDJA party (Rassemblement pour une Initiative de Développement avec une Jeunesse Avertie) she joined the Democratic Rally of the Comoros (RDC) ahead of the 2015 Comorian legislative election.

As a member of the RDC, she ran to represent Itsahidi in the Assembly of the Union of the Comoros in 2015. She was elected as one of only two members of her party in the legislature, with 64.91% of the vote in her district.

Oumouri was the only woman in the legislature in that session, and only the second female lawmaker elected to the assembly, after Sittou Raghadat Mohamed.

During her time in the Assembly, Oumouri fought for increased participation of women in politics, passing laws to establish quotas for both appointed and elected officials. She also worked to pass laws on sexual harassment and to oppose violence against women.

As a member of PFPOI, an organization of women politicians in the Indian Ocean region, she worked with peers in Madagascar and Mauritius.

On becoming one of the few prominent women politicians in her country, Oumouri said:

"To tell the truth, it was not easy. You know, men like for us all to work together, but to take their place is difficult. They don't give up their positions, so you have to go look for them and snatch them."

In 2019, after Oumouri voted in favor of the "enabling law," which gave President Azali Assoumani expanded powers, she was kicked out of her opposition RDC party. She did not run again in the 2020 Comorian legislative election, and Abdou-Rahim Mistoihi of the Convention for the Renewal of the Comoros succeeded her to represent Itsahidi.
