= 2025 Comorian parliamentary election =

- 12 January 2025 (first round); 30 January 2025 (re-run)
- 33 seats in the Assembly of the Union; 17 seats needed for a majority
Party	Leader	Vote %	Seats	+/–
CRC	Azali Assoumani	69.60	31	+11
PARI	Ibrahim Ali Mzimba	4.07	1	New
Independents	–	17.91	1	−1
This lists parties that won seats. See the complete results below.
President of the Assembly before
Moustadroine Abdou; CRC

Parliamentary elections were held in the Comoros on 12 January 2025, with a re-run on 30 January 2025 that followed a Supreme Court decision because of procedural irregularities.

== Electoral system ==
The 33 seats in the Assembly of the Union are elected in single-member constituencies using the two-round system. The voting age in the Comoros is 18, with voting being optional.

== Campaign ==
Some opposition parties boycotted the election, including the Juwa Party of former president Ahmed Abdallah Mohamed Sambi, which had previously boycotted the 2020 election. On Mohéli, only one of the island's five constituencies was contested due to the boycotts.

== Results ==
The ruling Convention for the Renewal of the Comoros of President Azali Assoumani retained a majority in the Assembly after winning 28 of 33 seats in the first round, according to election results announced on 14 January. One opposition candidate was also elected. Nour El Fath Azali, the 39-year-old son of President Assoumani and secretary general of the government since July 2024, was elected in the 28th constituency (Hambou) with over 78% of votes cast according to results published by the Independent Electoral Commission. The final results were to be announced by the Supreme Court on 22 January. The results in the constituencies Nº12 Domoni 1, Nº14 Domoni 3, Nº17 Nioumakélé 3 and Nº25 Itsandra South were annulled by the Supreme Court, with a re-run scheduled for 30 January 2025.

Party	Votes	%	Seats	+/–
Convention for the Renewal of the Comoros	114,261	69.60	31	+11
Orange Party	8,104	4.94	0	–2
Party for the Reform of Institutions	6,674	4.07	1	New
Democratic Rally of the Comoros for Equality	2,513	1.53	0	New
Twamaya Yahe Komori	2,496	1.52	0	New
Swauti	711	0.43	0	New
Independent	29,404	17.91	1	–1
Total	164,163	100.00	33	+9
Valid votes	164,163	68.72		
Invalid/blank votes	74,732	31.28		
Total votes	238,895	100.00		
Registered voters/turnout	338,940	70.48		

=== By constituency ===
Nº1 Dewa
Candidate	Party	Votes	%
Aboucar Said Chanfi	Convention for the Renewal of the Comoros	4,451	100.00
Total		4,451	100.00
Valid votes		4,451	89.65
Invalid/blank votes		514	10.35
Total votes		4,965	100.00
Registered voters/turnout		6,073	81.76

Nº2 Mtsoutrouni
Candidate	Party	Votes	%
Aboubacar Said Anli	Convention for the Renewal of the Comoros	3,607	100.00
Total		3,607	100.00
Valid votes		3,607	98.50
Invalid/blank votes		55	1.50
Total votes		3,662	100.00
Registered voters/turnout		4,863	75.30

Nº3 Djando
Candidate	Party	Votes	%
Milissane Hamdia Mhoma	Convention for the Renewal of the Comoros	3,981	100.00
Total		3,981	100.00
Valid votes		3,981	89.44
Invalid/blank votes		470	10.56
Total votes		4,451	100.00
Registered voters/turnout		5,019	88.68

Nº4 Mledjele
Candidate	Party	Votes	%
Ousmane Bouchrane	Convention for the Renewal of the Comoros	4,440	100.00
Total		4,440	100.00
Valid votes		4,440	94.45
Invalid/blank votes		261	5.55
Total votes		4,701	100.00
Registered voters/turnout		5,414	86.83

Nº5 Mombassa Mwoimbao
Candidate	Party	Votes	%
Dhoianfa Ali Attoumane	Convention for the Renewal of the Comoros	1,771	80.83
Madhoune Mikidache	Orange Party	420	19.17
Total		2,191	100.00
Valid votes		2,191	65.91
Invalid/blank votes		1,133	34.09
Total votes		3,324	100.00
Registered voters/turnout		3,906	85.10

Nº6 Sima 1
Candidate	Party	Votes	%
Moustadroine Abdou	Convention for the Renewal of the Comoros	5,061	81.21
Yasser Ali Assoumani	Independent	824	13.22
Archimed Youssouf	Independent	347	5.57
Total		6,232	100.00
Valid votes		6,232	67.67
Invalid/blank votes		2,978	32.33
Total votes		9,210	100.00
Registered voters/turnout		11,458	80.38

Nº7 Sima 2
Candidate	Party	Votes	%
Ahamadi Sidi	Convention for the Renewal of the Comoros	2,929	65.97
Hatub Abdallah	Independent	759	17.09
Inlimane Abdoulkarim	Orange Party	453	10.20
Ahmed Binour	Independent	292	6.58
Mohamed Ahmed Houmadi	Independent	7	0.16
Total		4,440	100.00
Valid votes		4,440	41.80
Invalid/blank votes		6,181	58.20
Total votes		10,621	100.00
Registered voters/turnout		11,957	88.83

Nº8 Mutsamudu 1
Candidate	Party	Votes	%
Miroidi Aboudou Idaroussi	Convention for the Renewal of the Comoros	4,688	69.98
Anynoulhouda Djaffar	Independent	1,290	19.26
Madiane Moufidhou	Independent	505	7.54
Said Yacine Said Hachim	Independent	216	3.22
Total		6,699	100.00
Valid votes		6,699	48.69
Invalid/blank votes		7,059	51.31
Total votes		13,758	100.00
Registered voters/turnout		20,351	67.60

Nº9 Mutsamudu 2
Candidate	Party	Votes	%
Mouzaoir Abdallah Thena	Convention for the Renewal of the Comoros	3,326	59.46
El-Enrif Aboulaithe Selemani	Independent	839	15.00
Soulaimana Baco Baco	Independent	818	14.62
Zaki Ahmed	Orange Party	611	10.92
Anrifiddine Abdou Bacar	Independent	0	0.00
Total		5,594	100.00
Valid votes		5,594	86.18
Invalid/blank votes		897	13.82
Total votes		6,491	100.00
Registered voters/turnout		7,908	82.08

Nº10 Ouani 1
Candidate	Party	Votes	%
Inayati Sidi	Convention for the Renewal of the Comoros	4,122	55.55
Mirghane Abdallah	Independent	2,582	34.80
Abdoul-Kader Zoubert	Orange Party	454	6.12
Fatimati Zahara Mohamed	Independent	262	3.53
Total		7,420	100.00
Valid votes		7,420	55.24
Invalid/blank votes		6,013	44.76
Total votes		13,433	100.00
Registered voters/turnout		15,942	84.26

Nº11 Ouani 2
Candidate	Party	Votes	%
Ladaenti Houmadi	Convention for the Renewal of the Comoros	2,194	56.87
Soifoine Ibrahime	Independent	1,276	33.07
Chafik Ali Houmadi	Orange Party	388	10.06
Total		3,858	100.00
Valid votes		3,858	55.75
Invalid/blank votes		3,062	44.25
Total votes		6,920	100.00
Registered voters/turnout		8,666	79.85

Nº12 Domoni 1
Candidate	Party	Votes	%
Daouidar Aboubacar	Convention for the Renewal of the Comoros	1,834	53.16
Dahilou Malide	Orange Party	1,616	46.84
Total		3,450	100.00
Valid votes		3,450	95.91
Invalid/blank votes		147	4.09
Total votes		3,597	100.00
Registered voters/turnout		9,284	38.74

Nº13 Domoni 2
Candidate	Party	Votes	%
Dayane Ridhoine Mouhamadi	Convention for the Renewal of the Comoros	6,665	100.00
Total		6,665	100.00
Valid votes		6,665	89.86
Invalid/blank votes		752	10.14
Total votes		7,417	100.00
Registered voters/turnout		9,207	80.56

Nº14 Domoni 3
Candidate	Party	Votes	%
Ahmed Ali Bacar	Convention for the Renewal of the Comoros	1,353	53.54
Ibrahim Mouhamed Hanif	Independent	1,174	46.46
Total		2,527	100.00
Valid votes		2,527	95.61
Invalid/blank votes		116	4.39
Total votes		2,643	100.00
Registered voters/turnout		10,085	26.21

Nº15 Nioumakélé 1
Candidate	Party	Votes	%
Ahamadi Saindou	Convention for the Renewal of the Comoros	2,581	63.46
Nizar Ahamed	Independent	1,486	36.54
Total		4,067	100.00
Valid votes		4,067	61.99
Invalid/blank votes		2,494	38.01
Total votes		6,561	100.00
Registered voters/turnout		7,960	82.42

Nº16 Nioumakélé 2
Candidate	Party	Votes	%
Mohamed Ahmed Said	Convention for the Renewal of the Comoros	2,327	60.41
Houmadi Abdallah	Independent	818	21.24
Dhoihirdine Djazila	Independent	707	18.35
Total		3,852	100.00
Valid votes		3,852	73.30
Invalid/blank votes		1,403	26.70
Total votes		5,255	100.00
Registered voters/turnout		9,336	56.29

Nº17 Nioumakélé 3
Candidate	Party	Votes	%
Soultoine Ali	Independent	2,022	59.54
Assani Houmadi Abdallah	Convention for the Renewal of the Comoros	1,331	39.19
Toyhane Combo Houmadi	Independent	22	0.65
Almeche Ahmed	Independent	21	0.62
Total		3,396	100.00
Valid votes		3,396	98.04
Invalid/blank votes		68	1.96
Total votes		3,464	100.00
Registered voters/turnout		10,411	33.27

Nº18 Moroni North
Candidate	Party	Votes	%
Charifa Abdallah	Convention for the Renewal of the Comoros	1,758	67.41
Ibrahim Mohamed Soule	Independent	432	16.56
Fahardine Msahazi	Independent	418	16.03
Total		2,608	100.00
Valid votes		2,608	79.56
Invalid/blank votes		670	20.44
Total votes		3,278	100.00
Registered voters/turnout		9,825	33.36

Nº19 Moroni South
Candidate	Party	Votes	%
Ahmed Youssouf Abdou	Convention for the Renewal of the Comoros	2,845	60.25
Djoumoi Idjabou Mroivili	Orange Party	845	17.89
Mohamed Mze Ali Amir Eddine	Swauti	711	15.06
Aboudou Soefo Ridjal	Independent	260	5.51
Ambdel-Roibi Ahmed	Independent	61	1.29
Total		4,722	100.00
Valid votes		4,722	77.25
Invalid/blank votes		1,391	22.75
Total votes		6,113	100.00
Registered voters/turnout		9,121	67.02

Nº20 Bambao 1
Candidate	Party	Votes	%
Mariama Ahamada Msa	Convention for the Renewal of the Comoros	4,483	71.01
Amine Nacer-Eddine	Independent	755	11.96
Toufe Maecha	Independent	632	10.01
Athoumane Hicham	Orange Party	423	6.70
Moussa Ibrahim	Independent	20	0.32
Total		6,313	100.00
Valid votes		6,313	79.92
Invalid/blank votes		1,586	20.08
Total votes		7,899	100.00
Registered voters/turnout		10,901	72.46

Nº21 Bambao 2
Candidate	Party	Votes	%
Daniel Ali Bandar	Convention for the Renewal of the Comoros	4,868	76.09
Djaouhari Youssouf Adam	Orange Party	1,530	23.91
Total		6,398	100.00
Valid votes		6,398	54.63
Invalid/blank votes		5,314	45.37
Total votes		11,712	100.00
Registered voters/turnout		12,591	93.02

Nº22 Oichili
Candidate	Party	Votes	%
Chatoi Abdou Mohamed	Convention for the Renewal of the Comoros	3,068	62.17
Mohamed Rachad Abdallah	Independent	1,130	22.90
Said Hassane Abderemane	Orange Party	496	10.05
Mze Soilihi Kaambi	Independent	241	4.88
Total		4,935	100.00
Valid votes		4,935	76.85
Invalid/blank votes		1,487	23.15
Total votes		6,422	100.00
Registered voters/turnout		9,412	68.23

Nº23 Dimani
Candidate	Party	Votes	%
Zoubeiri Mohamed Ahamed	Convention for the Renewal of the Comoros	2,152	63.74
Mohamed Youssouf Ali	Democratic Rally of the Comoros for Equality	654	19.37
Ali Mohamed	Independent	431	12.77
Ahamada Mmadi	Orange Party	139	4.12
Total		3,376	100.00
Valid votes		3,376	63.27
Invalid/blank votes		1,960	36.73
Total votes		5,336	100.00
Registered voters/turnout		6,403	83.34

Nº24 Itsandra North
Candidate	Party	Votes	%
M'madi Hassani Oumouri	Convention for the Renewal of the Comoros	6,010	82.59
Mohamed Daoud	Democratic Rally of the Comoros for Equality	1,267	17.41
Total		7,277	100.00
Valid votes		7,277	74.77
Invalid/blank votes		2,455	25.23
Total votes		9,732	100.00
Registered voters/turnout		14,303	68.04

Nº25 Itsandra South
Candidate	Party	Votes	%
Said Housseini Aboubacar	Convention for the Renewal of the Comoros	2,324	54.27
Said Ibrahim Fahmi	Independent	1,619	37.81
Kassim Omar Houdhoir	Orange Party	270	6.31
Attoumani Abdou Dia	Democratic Rally of the Comoros for Equality	69	1.61
Total		4,282	100.00
Valid votes		4,282	93.47
Invalid/blank votes		299	6.53
Total votes		4,581	100.00
Registered voters/turnout		12,551	36.50

Nº26 Mitsamihouli
Candidate	Party	Votes	%
Ibrahim Abdou Hamad	Convention for the Renewal of the Comoros	5,278	64.07
Mouigni Choukran	Party for the Reform of Institutions	1,877	22.78
Youssouf Assiadi	Independent	647	7.85
Habibou Djae	Independent	223	2.71
Alhadhuiri Mohamed	Orange Party	213	2.59
Total		8,238	100.00
Valid votes		8,238	66.54
Invalid/blank votes		4,142	33.46
Total votes		12,380	100.00
Registered voters/turnout		18,481	66.99

Nº27 Mboudé
Candidate	Party	Votes	%
Bacar Mvoulana	Convention for the Renewal of the Comoros	5,037	69.59
Rachidi Ali	Independent	647	8.94
Aslahdine Mohamed	Independent	512	7.07
Mradabi Ali Youssouf	Independent	495	6.84
Ibrahim Youssouf	Independent	343	4.74
Saadi Abdou	Independent	204	2.82
Total		7,238	100.00
Valid votes		7,238	80.04
Invalid/blank votes		1,805	19.96
Total votes		9,043	100.00
Registered voters/turnout		11,444	79.02

Nº28 Hambou
Candidate	Party	Votes	%
Azali Nour-El-Fatah	Convention for the Renewal of the Comoros	3,948	78.38
Ibrahim Moussa Mmadi	Independent	579	11.49
Said Abdoulhalim Mohamed Elamine	Independent	510	10.13
Total		5,037	100.00
Valid votes		5,037	54.25
Invalid/blank votes		4,247	45.75
Total votes		9,284	100.00
Registered voters/turnout		13,551	68.51

Nº29 Hamahamet
Candidate	Party	Votes	%
Mbae Mohamed	Convention for the Renewal of the Comoros	3,478	58.22
Hamidou Karihila Hamadi	Twamaya Yahe Komori	2,496	41.78
Total		5,974	100.00
Valid votes		5,974	58.87
Invalid/blank votes		4,173	41.13
Total votes		10,147	100.00
Registered voters/turnout		13,399	75.73

Nº30 Mboikou
Candidate	Party	Votes	%
Maoulida Bacar	Convention for the Renewal of the Comoros	1,756	51.38
Nadjari Ali	Independent	690	20.19
Salami Mohamed	Democratic Rally of the Comoros for Equality	523	15.30
Mohamed Assoumani	Independent	345	10.09
Denize Ahamada	Party for the Reform of Institutions	81	2.37
Mihidjai Youssouf	Independent	23	0.67
Total		3,418	100.00
Valid votes		3,418	75.40
Invalid/blank votes		1,115	24.60
Total votes		4,533	100.00
Registered voters/turnout		5,756	78.75

Nº31 Mbadjini Ngouengwe
Candidate	Party	Votes	%
Ibrahim Ali Mzimba	Party for the Reform of Institutions	4,142	50.26
Dini Ibrahim	Convention for the Renewal of the Comoros	3,130	37.98
Djoumoi Said Abdallah	Independent	572	6.94
Mohamed Halidi Zoubeiri	Independent	282	3.42
Ben Ahmed Abdouroihamane	Independent	115	1.40
Total		8,241	100.00
Valid votes		8,241	62.83
Invalid/blank votes		4,875	37.17
Total votes		13,116	100.00
Registered voters/turnout		15,302	85.71

Nº32 Mbadjini Itsahidi
Candidate	Party	Votes	%
Ali Boina Mze	Convention for the Renewal of the Comoros	4,738	82.30
Idi Boina	Independent	773	13.43
Abdou Mmadi Zainaba	Orange Party	246	4.27
Total		5,757	100.00
Valid votes		5,757	59.39
Invalid/blank votes		3,936	40.61
Total votes		9,693	100.00
Registered voters/turnout		10,757	90.11

Nº33 Mbadjini Pimba
Candidate	Party	Votes	%
Hamdani Bakar	Convention for the Renewal of the Comoros	2,727	78.38
Mohamed Chakira Ali	Party for the Reform of Institutions	574	16.50
Mohamed Said Abdallah	Independent	178	5.12
Total		3,479	100.00
Valid votes		3,479	67.51
Invalid/blank votes		1,674	32.49
Total votes		5,153	100.00
Registered voters/turnout		7,303	70.56
