= 2018–2019 Comoran protests =

The 2018–2019 Comoran protests were a series of mass protests and a deadly uprisings consisting of strikes, riots, demonstrations, and marches in opposition to president Azali Assoumani in Comoros in 2018–2019.

== History ==
In June–July 2018, mass protests and demonstrations occurred led by the opposition against a referendum on constitutional terms. Rioting erupted and police arrested three protesters in the city of Moroni. One week of protests occurred in the country. Protesters were met with police repression and force.

In March, daily protests by tens of thousands of Comorans occurred in Mayotte demanding the sending of Comoran civilians of Mayotte to Comoros and Comorans demonstrated the next month against the protests and called on the national government to take action. It also called on the re-claim of the French territory of Mayotte. The island was gripped by protests and unrest for weeks.

In May-June, violent protests rocked the areas of Mayotte and Anjouan, calling on an independence referendum. Political unrest, anti-government demonstrations led by opposition activists calling on the government to step down was dispersed by riot police, who used tear gas to disperse angry protests and demonstrations in Moroni.

A popular rebellion occurred between armed rebels and the army of Comoros in a mysterious uprising in Anjouan. 3 weeks of fighting took place in October, but the rebels were defeated in the country. Shootings, killings and violence was reported during the unrest and conflict on the island and the rebels were defeated in the armed uprising.

The 2019 Comorian presidential election took place in March 2019 amid street protests and anger. Popular protests was on a rise after the results of the elections was announced, 2 were killed in clashes with Soldiers and demonstrators, while escalating tensions and anti-government rioting was a frequent occurrence. The crackdown left 2 demonstrators killed. Civil disobedience campaigns, boycotts, nonviolent demonstrations, frequent anti-government acts of disorder was taking place in March-April and riots was quelled.

== See also ==
- 2019 Comorian presidential election
