= Ladaenti Houmadi =

Comorian politician

Ladaenti Houmadi (born 1983 in Chandra) is a Comorian politician.

Houmadi was appointed Minister of Employment, Youth, and Sports in 2018 in the government of Azali Assoumani, which she left in June 2019.

Houmadi has been a member of the Assembly of the Union of the Comoros for Cuvette in Anjouan since 2020.
