= Bourhane =

Bourhane is a surname and given name may refer:

== Surname ==
- Yacine Bourhane (born 1998), Comorian footballer
- Nourdine Bourhane (born 1950), Comorian politician

== Given name ==
- Bourhane Hamidou, Comorian politician

== See also ==
- Ali Aref Bourhan (1934-2025), Djiboutian politician
