= Party for the Comorian Agreement =

Political party in the Comoros

The Party for the Comorian Agreement (French: Parti pour l'Entente Comorienne, PEC) is a political party in the Comoros.

== History ==
In the 2015 parliamentary elections the PEC won one of the 24 directly-elected seats, with Saïd Ibrahim Fahmi elected in Itsandra South.
