= Oumouri =

Oumouri is a surname. Notable people with the surname include:

- Hadjira Oumouri (born 1969), Comorian politician
- Younous Oumouri (born 1975), Malagasy footballer
