= Bourhane Hamidou =

Bourhane Hamidou is a politician from Comoros who served as President and Speaker of the Assembly of Comoros. He was an independent candidate for 2016 Comorian presidential election in which he got 6,397 votes. He is the supporter of Sun Party of Comoros. In March 2015, he resigned as Speaker. He also served as Minister of Interior and Information.

In 2024, he ran again as an independent candidate in the 2024 Comorian presidential election receiving 2,709 votes, or 5.14%.
