= Rally for an Alternative of Harmonious and Integrated Development =

Political party in the Comoros

The Rally for an Alternative of Harmonious and Integrated Development (French: Rassemblement pour une Alternative de Développement Harmonieux et Intégré, RADHI) is a political party in the Comoros.

== History ==
In the 2015 parliamentary elections RADHI won one of the 24 directly-elected seats, with Ahamada Baco elected in Mitsamiouli–Mboude.
