= Tourism in the Comoros =

The Comoros does not have a strong tourist industry.

== Tourist numbers ==
Although the Comoros has many natural resources for tourism, such as its beaches and marine environment, it does not have as strong a tourist industry as its regional competitors Réunion, Mauritius, and Seychelles. Its weak tourist industry is mainly because of its insecure political climate, with many political upheavals over the past three decades.

Tourists in the Comoros are mainly wealthy Americans and Europeans, while much of the investment in hotels has come from South Africa.

== Tourist attractions ==
The main tourist attractions in the Comoros are its beaches, fishing, and mountain scenery. Mohéli is a picturesque tourist attraction. Grand Comore has an international airport and most of the Comoros' few hotels.
