= 2019 Comorian presidential election =

Re-election of Azali Assoumani

- 24 March 2019
- Turnout: 53.84%
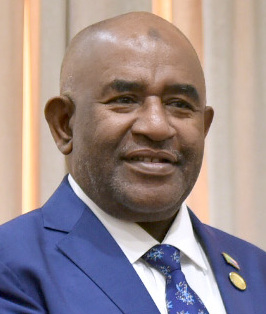

Candidate	Azali Assoumani	Mahamoud Ahamada	Mouigni Baraka
Party	CRC	Independent	Independent
Popular vote	96,635	23,233	8,851
Percentage	60.77%	14.61%	5.57%
President before election
Azali Assoumani
CRC
Elected President
Azali Assoumani
CRC

Early presidential elections were held in the Comoros on 24 March 2019 alongside regional elections. A second round would have been held on 21 April if required, but incumbent President Azali Assoumani was re-elected in the first round of voting.

== Electoral system ==
Until 2018, the presidency of the Comoros rotated between the country's three main islands; Anjouan, Grande Comore and Mohéli. The 2010 elections were limited to Mohélian candidates and the 2016 elections saw candidates from Grand Comore contest the elections. The next presidential election would have seen a president elected from Anjouan.

However, a constitutional referendum in July 2018 saw voters approve constitutional amendments that scrapped the rotation system and instituted a standard two-round system in which a candidate has to receive a majority of the vote in the first round to be elected, with a second round held if no candidate is able to win in the first round. The changes also moved the next presidential elections forward to 2019 and allowed incumbent President Azali Assoumani run for a second term.

The referendum led to violent protests and an armed uprising in Anjouan in October 2018, which was stopped by the military after several days.

== Candidates ==
A total of 20 candidates registered to contest the elections, with the Supreme Court determining the final list of eligible participants. Incumbent President Assoumani ran for reelection, whilst other candidates attempting to register included the two losing candidates from the nationwide vote in 2016 (Mohamed Ali Soilihi and Mouigni Baraka) and Salim Saadi, who contested the 2016 primary elections as an independent. Seven of the 20 applicants were rejected, including the main opposition candidate Ibrahim Mohamed Soulé.

Approved candidates
Candidate	Party	Notes
Mahamoud Ahamada	Independent	Lawyer to former President Ahmed Abdallah Mohamed Sambi
Azali Assoumani	Convention for the Renewal of the Comoros	Incumbent President
Said Djaffar Elmacely	Independent	
Hassani Hamadi	Independent	Governor of Grande Comore
Fahmi Said Ibrahim	Independent	
Hamidou Karihila	Independent	Former Secretary of State for the Arab Worldm, ex-CRC
Saïd Larifou	Independent	Leader of the RIDJA party
Ali Mhadji	Independent	MP for Hambou, ex-CRC
Ibrahim Ali Mzimba	Independent	President of the Bar Association
Salim Saadi	Independent	Entrepreneur
Achmet Saïd	Independent	Dean of the Faculty of Science and Technology
Mohamed Ali Soilihi	Union for the Development of the Comoros	
Mohamed Soilihi	Independent	Former Chief of Staff of the Comorian Army
Mouigni Baraka	Independent	Former Governor of Grande Comore
Rejected candidates
Bourhane Abdallah	Independent	Entrepreneur
Youssouf Boina	Independent	
Moustoifa Saïd Cheikh	Democratic Front	
Soilihi Mohamed Soilihi	Independent	Former ambassador to the United States
Zile Soilih	Independent	
Ibrahim Mohamed Soulé	Juwa Party	
Source: Al-Watwan

== Results ==
Candidate	Party	Votes	%
Azali Assoumani	Convention for the Renewal of the Comoros	96,635	60.77
Mahamoud Ahamada	Independent	23,233	14.61
Mouigni Baraka	Independent	8,851	5.57
Mohamed Ali Soilihi	Union for the Development of the Comoros	6,110	3.84
Hamidou Karihila	Independent	3,880	2.44
Fahmi Said Ibrahim	Independent	3,782	2.38
Hassani Hamadi	Independent	3,576	2.25
Saïd Larifou	Independent	3,368	2.12
Achmet Saïd	Independent	3,326	2.09
Ibrahim Ali Mzimba	Independent	2,185	1.37
Ali Mhadji	Independent	1,484	0.93
Said Djaffar Elmacely	Independent	1,474	0.93
Salim Saadi	Independent	1,104	0.69
Total		159,008	100.00
Valid votes		159,008	95.53
Invalid/blank votes		7,439	4.47
Total votes		166,447	100.00
Registered voters/turnout		309,137	53.84
Source: CENI

== Aftermath ==
Following the election, the fourth-placed candidate Mohamed Soilihi called for the results to be invalidated and for a campaign of civil disobedience. He was subsequently arrested.
