= 2016 Comorian presidential election =

Second election of Azali Assoumani

- 21 February 2016 (primary); 10 April 2016 (national)
- Turnout: 74.48% (primary); 69.12% (national)
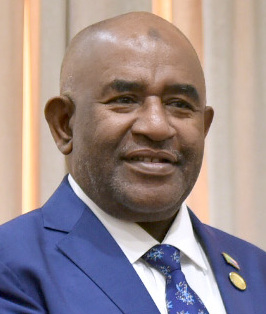

Nominee	Azali Assoumani	Mohamed Ali Soilihi	Mouigni Baraka
Party	CRC	UPDC	RDC
Popular vote	81,214	77,736	37,073
Percentage	41.43%	39.66%	18.91%
President before election
Ikililou Dhoinine
Elected President
Azali Assoumani
CRC

Presidential elections were held in the Comoros on 21 February 2016, with a second round to be held on 10 April 2016, alongside elections for the Governors of the three islands. A re-run of the second round was held in thirteen constituencies on Anjouan on 11 May. Azali Assoumani of the Convention for the Renewal of the Comoros was elected President with 41% of the vote.

== Electoral system ==
The presidency of the Comoros rotates between the country's three main islands; Anjouan, Grande Comore and Mohéli. The 2006 elections were limited to candidates from Anjouan and the 2010 elections to Mohélian candidates. As a result, the 2016 elections will see presidential candidacy limited to Grande Comore residents.

A primary election took place on Grande Comore on 21 February, with the three top candidates progressing to the nationwide second round on 10 April, where a plurality determined the winner.

== Campaign ==
On 30 October 2013 former President Ahmed Sambi launched the Juwa Party, announcing that he would run in the elections.

== Results ==
Candidate	Party	Grand Comore primary		National vote	
Candidate	Party	Votes	%	Votes	%
Mohamed Ali Soilihi	Union for the Development of the Comoros	19,541	17.61	77,736	39.66
Mouigni Baraka	Democratic Rally of the Comoros	16,738	15.09	37,073	18.91
Azali Assoumani	Convention for the Renewal of the Comoros	16,596	14.96	81,214	41.43
Fahmi Said Ibrahim	Independent	16,034	14.45		
Larifou Said	Rally for a Development Initiative with an Enlightened Youth	6,795	6.12		
Bourhane Hamidou	Independent	6,397	5.77		
Mohamed Daoudou	Orange Party	4,662	4.20		
Said Hachim Achiraffi	Convention for Democratic Alternation and Mutual Interaction	3,229	2.91		
Assoumani Aboudou	URANGO	2,847	2.57		
Mohamed Issimalia	Independent	2,041	1.84		
Salimou Mohamed Amiri	Independent	1,938	1.75		
Nassor Mohamed Ali	Independent	1,901	1.71		
Mzé Abdou Soulé El-Back	Social Democrat Party of the Comoros–Dudja	1,767	1.59		
Said Ali Kemal Ed-Dine		1,570	1.42		
Abdouloihabi Mohamed	Political Alliance for the Safeguarding of Institutions	1,377	1.24		
Ibrahima Hissani Mfoihaya	Alliance of Progressive Forces for Change	1,366	1.23		
Allaoui Said Haimdou	Ulezi	1,055	0.95		
Salim Saadi	Independent	1,033	0.93		
Cheikh Ahmed Said Abdourahmane	Movement for the Development of the Comoros	767	0.69		
Youssouf Abdou Moinaecha	Independent	735	0.66		
Said Ahmed Said Ali	Comorian Union for Progress	573	0.52		
Youssouf Said Mahazi	Independent	552	0.50		
Mohamed Mohamed Ali Dia	Komor Ya Leo Na Messo	535	0.48		
Maecha Mtara	National Rally for Development–Renewal	455	0.41		
Mahamoud Ahmed Wadaane	RIFAID	443	0.40		
Total		110,947	100.00	196,023	100.00
Valid votes		110,947	93.89	196,023	94.22
Invalid/blank votes		7,214	6.11	12,026	5.78
Total votes		118,161	100.00	208,049	100.00
Registered voters/turnout		158,645	74.48	301,006	69.12
Source: Comores Infos (first round, second round)

== Reactions ==
=== Domestic ===
- Mohamed Ali Soilihi, presidential candidate from the Union for the Development of the Comoros and former vice president of Comoros, rejected the results. Ali Soilihi alleged that the released results by the Independent National Electoral Commission is only partial and that the margin is too small for them to declare the results.

=== International ===
- African Union: The African Union observers headed by Moncef Marzouki declared the elections to be free and transparent and was conducted in a peaceful manner.
- Arab League: The Arab league declared the first round of elections free and fair.
- European Union: Prior to the election the European Union help fund and train Independent National Electoral Commission to help them conduct free and fair elections. Though the EU did not send an observer mission to the isles, the International Francophonie Organization based in France sent an observer team. The organization commended both the people and the authorities that held the elections in a peaceful and orderly process.
- United Nations: The UN Secretary general Ban Ki-moon commended the people for conducting the elections peacefully and requested that all members of the election resolve their issues in a peaceful and legal manner.

== Aftermath ==
After the provisional results were released, Mohamed Ali Soilihi refused to accept his defeat by Azali Assoumani and claimed that not all the results from Anjouan had been properly released and the margin was too narrow for CENI to declare a winner. The Constitutional Court ordered a partial re-run to be held in 13 constituencies by 15 May.
