= Union for the Development of the Comoros =

- President: Mohamed Halifa
- Founded: February 2013

The Union for the Development of the Comoros (French: Union pour le Développement des Comores, UPDC; Arabic: الاتحاد لتنمية جزر القمر, romanized: Alaitihad litanmiat juzur alqamar) is a political alliance in the Comoros. The party's president is Mohamed Halifa.

== History ==
The UPDC was established in February 2013 as an alliance of parties that supported President Ikililou Dhoinine. It was initially named the Rally for Democracy in the Comoros (Rassemblement pour la Démocratie aux Comoros, Radeco), but was later renamed Union for the Development of the Comoros.

In the 2015 parliamentary elections the UPDC emerged as the largest party, winning eight of the 24 directly elected seats. Mohamed Ali Soilihi was the party's candidate for the 2019 presidential elections, finishing fourth with 4% of the vote.
