= Juwa Party =

Juwa Party Parti Juwa
- Founder: Ahmed Abdallah Mohamed Sambi
- Founded: 13 October 2013
- Ideology: Populism; Anti-imperialism; Secularism
- Religion: Islam
- International affiliation: World Anti-Imperialist Platform
- Colours: Green
- Assembly of the Union: 0 / 24

Website
- Website (archived)

The Juwa Party (French: Parti Juwa, lit. 'Sun Party', PJ) is a political party in the Comoros. The party was established by former president Ahmed Abdallah Mohamed Sambi in 2013 and became the main opposition party in 2015. After boycotting the 2020 elections, it currently has no representation in parliament.

== History ==
The party was established on 30 October 2013 by former President Ahmed Abdallah Mohamed Sambi; "Juwa" is the Comorian word for "Sun". In the 2015 parliamentary elections it emerged as the second-largest faction in the Assembly of the Union, winning seven of the 24 directly elected seats. The party did not contest the 2016 presidential elections.

In the 2019 presidential election, the Juwa Party candidate Ibrahim Mohamed Soulé was disqualified on the grounds that his application form was signed by the deputy secretary-general of the party and not the secretary-general of the party, Ahmed Al Barwane, who was in prison. Following the verdict, the party lent its support to independent candidate Mahamoudo Ahamada. Ahamada finished second with 15% of the vote, with President Azali Assoumani winning with 61%. Violent protests after the election, whose leaders included Juwa party members, were violently dispersed by the army. Ahamada subsequently became joint leader of the party with Sambi.

The Juwa Party and other opposition parties boycotted the 2020 parliamentary elections, claiming they had not obtained guarantees of a 'transparent, free and democratic' election, or the right of Comorian expatriates to vote.
