= Abdou Ousseni =

Comoros politician

Abdou Ousseni is the official from Comoros who served as Justice Minister and speaker and member of National Assembly of Comoros. He was elected as Speaker of National Assembly from 4 April 2015 to 3 April 2020.
