= Itsandra =

State on the island of Grande Comore until 1886

Coordinates: 11°40′16″S 43°15′17″E

Itsandra was one of the two major sultanates on the island of Grande Comore before the French colonization of the Comoros. It was taken over by the Sultanate of Anjouan in 1886 and became a part of the united Sultanate of Ngazidja.

== Sultans ==
Sultans of Itsandra:

- Mussafumu bin Fey Fumu (1870 – 1871)
- Tibé Bamba Sujaoma (1871)
- Mussafumu bin Fey Fumu (1871 – 1881)
- Tibé Bamba Sujaoma (1881 – 1882)
- Mussafumu bin Fey Fumu (1882 – 1883)
- 1880s Abudu Sujaoma
- 1880s Kaleheza Sujaoma
- 1880s Fumu Mwanda bin Higne
