= Orange Party =

Comorian political party

Republican Organization for the Future of New Generations Organisation républicaine pour l'avenir des nouvelles générations
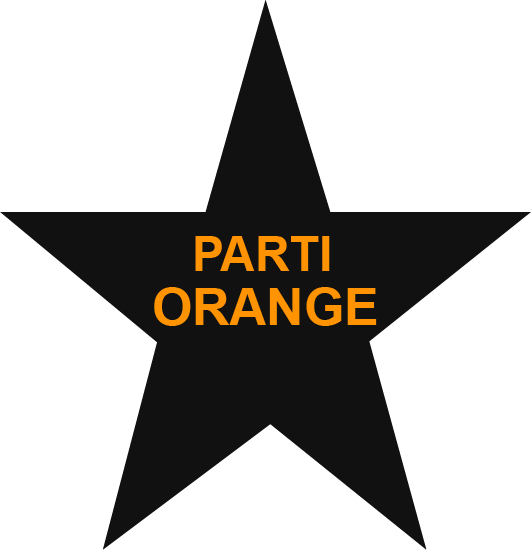
- Abbreviation: ORANGE
- President: Mohamed Daoudou
- Founded: 2010
- Assembly of the Union: 0 / 24

Website
- www.partiorangecomoros.org

The Orange Party, officially the Republican Organization for the Future of New Generations (French: Organisation républicaine pour l'avenir des nouvelles générations, ORANGE), is a political party in the Comoros led by Mohamed Daoudou.

== History ==
The party was founded by Idi Nadhoim in 2010. The party first contested national elections in the 2015 parliamentary elections, when it received 6% of the vote, but failed to win a seat. The party nominated Daoudou as its candidate for the 2016 presidential elections, in which he finished seventh out of 25 candidates with 4% of the vote. Although the party's vote share fell to 4% in the 2020 elections, it won two seats, becoming the second-largest party in the Assembly of the Union.
