= Democratic Rally of the Comoros =

Political party in the Comoros

The Democratic Rally of the Comoros (French: Rassemblement Démocratique des Comores, RDC) is a political party in the Comoros led by Mouigni Baraka, Governor of Grande Comore.

== History ==
The party was established in November 2013. In the 2015 parliamentary elections the RDC won two of the 24 directly-elected seats; Hadjira Oumouri was elected in Itsahidi and Oumouri M'madi Hassani in Itsandra North.
