= Assembly of the Union of the Comoros =

Legislative body of the Comoros

Assembly of the Union of the Comoros جمعية اتحاد جزر القمر Assemblée de l'Union des Comores

Type
- Type: Unicameral

History
- Founded: 2004

Leadership
- President: Moustadroine Abdou since 3 April 2020
- Vice Presidents: Abdallah Ali Mchangama; Mostoifa Ahmed Hassan; Ibrahim Ali Soilihi; Youssouf Abdou Omar since 3 April 2020
- Leader of the Opposition: Mohamed Omar Abubakar since 3 April 2020

Structure
- Seats: 33
- Political groups: Government (31): CRC (31); Others (2): PARI (1); Independent (1)
- Length of term: 5 years

Elections
- Voting system: Two-round system
- Last election: 12 and 30 January 2025

Meeting place
- Moroni

The unicameral Assembly of the Union of the Comoros is the country's legislative body. It was established in 2004.

== Legislative history ==
The Comorian legislative body, Chamber of Deputies, was established in 1961. It was reconstituted as the National Assembly in July 1975. It was followed by the Federal Assembly, which had 33-43 members before year 2004. The name Assembly of the Union was taken into use in 2004. Since 2020, it has had 24 members instead of 33.

== Presidents of the Chamber of Deputies ==
Name	Took office	Left office	Notes
Saïd Ibrahim	1958	1970	président de la Chambre des députés
Ahmed Abdallah	2 April 1970	6 June 1970	président de la Chambre des députés
Said Mohamed Jaffar	? - January 1972	January 1972 - ?	président de la Chambre des députés
Said Mohamed Djohar	June 1972	October 1972	président de la Chambre des députés
Mouzaoir Abdallah	? - 1973	19 April 1975	président de la Chambre des Députés
Ahmed Dahalani	7 May 1975	July 1975	président de la Chambre des Députés

== Presidents of the Assembly ==
Name	Took office	Left office	Notes
Mohamed Taki Abdoulkarim	1978	1984	Left 1984 without resigning
Abdérémane Mohamed	? - 1985	1985 - ?	Interim
Abdallah Halifa	1987	1992	
Amir Attoumane	1992	1994	
Mohamed Said Abdallah M'Changama	1994	1997	
Salim Djabir Salim	1997	April 1999	
In abeyance	April 1999	2004	
Saïd Dhoifir Bounou	June 2004	2009	
Bourhane Hamidou	15 January 2010	April 2015	
Abdou Ousseni	4 April 2015	3 April 2020	
Moustadroine Abdou	3 April 2020	Incumbent	

== See also ==
- Assemblies of the Autonomous Islands of the Comoros
  - Assembly of the Autonomous Island of Anjouan
  - Assembly of the Autonomous Island of Grande Comore
  - Assembly of the Autonomous Island of Mohéli
- History of the Comoros
- Legislature
- List of legislatures by country
- Politics of the Comoros
