= Mouigni Baraka =

Comorian politician

Mouigni Baraka Saïd Soilihi (born 7 September 1968) is a Comorian politician. He was the governor of the autonomous island of Ngazidja elected in 2010. Soilihi served as governor of the island from 26 May 2011 (after being sworn in on 23 May 2011) and he served a 5-year term.

Mouigni Baraka is a trained customs officer.

He was a candidate in the 2016 presidential election, under the label of the Democratic Rally of the Comoros. He obtained 16,738 votes and came second in the premier tour, i.e., 15% of those expressed. Maintained in the second round, he called to vote for Mohamed Ali Soilihi. Baraka finished third and last with 37,073 votes (18%), Ali Soilihi was second, and Azali Assoumani was elected.

A candidate again in 2019, this time as an independent; he was third at the end of the first and only round, which saw the re-election of Azali Assoumani. He obtained 8,851 votes, or 6% of the votes cast.

In November 2023, Mouigni Baraka Saïd Soilihi officially declared his candidacy for the presidential election of 14 January 2024.
