= Convention for the Renewal of the Comoros =

Political party in the Comoros

Convention for the Renewal of the Comoros Convention pour le Renouveau des Comores
- Leader: Azali Assoumani
- Secretary-General: Houmed M'saidié
- Founded: September 2002
- Split from: Democratic Front of the Comoros
- Membership (2023): ~30,000
- Ideology: Social democracy Democratic socialism
- Political position: Centre-left
- Assembly of the Union: 31 / 33

Website
- https://crc.blogs.fr/page_2.html

The Convention for the Renewal of the Comoros (French: Convention pour le Renouveau des Comores, CRC) is a political party in the Comoros.

== History ==
The CRC was established in September 2002 by members of the Movement for Socialism and Democracy, a group expelled from the Democratic Front. In the 2004 parliamentary elections the party won six of the 18 elected seats, becoming the only opposition to the Camp of the Autonomous Islands alliance.

The party won two seats in the 2015 parliamentary elections, taken by Ali Mhadji and Charif Maoulana.

In January 2020, the legislative elections in Comoros were dominated by the CRC. It took an overwhelming majority in the parliament and party leader Azali Assoumani's hold on power strengthened. The CRC won 17 out of 24 legislative seats.

In January 2024, President Azali Assoumani was re-elected with 63% of the vote in the disputed presidential election. In January 2025, the ruling CRC party of president Azali Assoumani won parliamentary election, taking 28 out of 33 parliamentary seats. The opposition parties rejected the results.
