= Azali Assoumani =

President of the Comoros

- غزالي عثماني
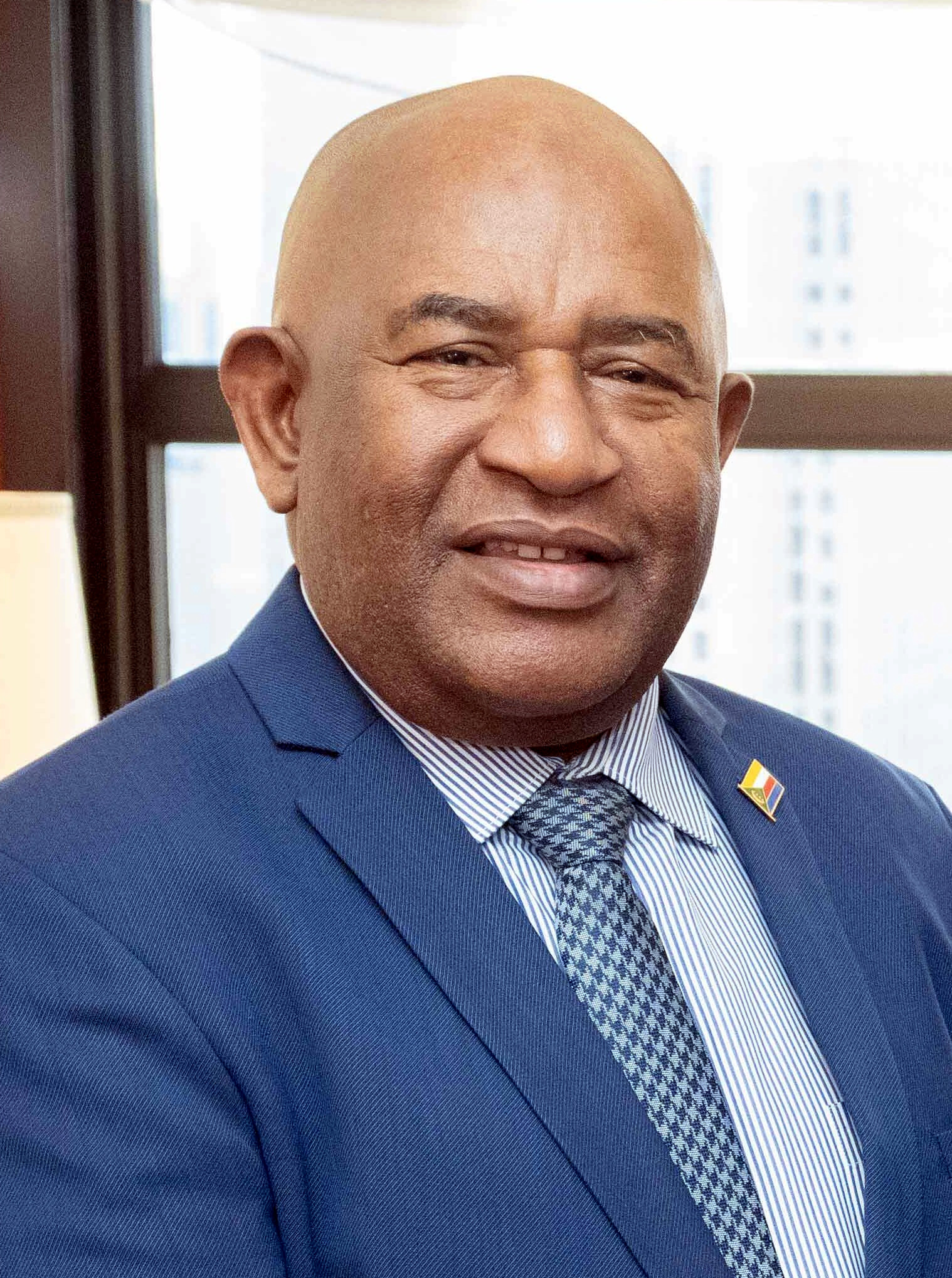
- Assoumani in 2023

7th President of the Comoros
- Incumbent
- Assumed office 3 April 2019
- Preceded by: Moustadroine Abdou (acting)
- In office 26 May 2016 – 13 February 2019
- Vice President: Abdallah Said Sarouma; Djaffar Ahmed Said; Moustadroine Abdou
- Preceded by: Ikililou Dhoinine
- Succeeded by: Moustadroine Abdou (acting)
- In office 26 May 2002 – 26 May 2006
- Vice President: Caabi El-Yachroutu Mohamed; Rachidi ben Massonde
- Preceded by: Hamada Madi (interim)
- Succeeded by: Ahmed Abdallah Mohamed Sambi

President of the Council of State of the Comoros
- In office 30 April 1999 – 21 January 2002
- Prime Minister: Bianrifi Tarmidi; Hamada Madi
- Preceded by: Tadjidine Ben Said Massounde (acting)
- Succeeded by: Hamada Madi (acting)

21st Chairperson of the African Union
- In office 18 February 2023 – 17 February 2024
- Preceded by: Macky Sall
- Succeeded by: Mohamed Ould Ghazouani

Personal details
- Born: 1 January 1959 (age 67) Mitsoudjé, French Comoros
- Party: Convention for the Renewal of the Comoros
- Spouse: Ambari Daroueche
- Children: Nour El Fath Azali; Loukman Azali; Yasser Azali; Ilham Azali
- Profession: Senior military officer

Azali Assoumani (Arabic: غزالي عثماني; born 1 January 1959) is a Comorian politician and military officer who has served as the seventh President of the Comoros from 2002 to 2006 and again since 2016, except for a brief period in 2019. He became head of state after staging a coup d'état in 1999 and was elected president in 2002, 2016, 2019 and 2024. He also served as Chairperson of the African Union from February 2023 to February 2024. Assoumani's current presidency has been described as increasingly authoritarian.

== Early life ==
Born in 1959 in Mitsoudjé, French Comoros, Assoumani trained at the Meknes Royal Military Academy in Morocco and the École de Guerre in Paris.

== Political career ==
Assoumani became the President of the Council of State of the Comoros in 1999 after overthrowing interim president Tadjidine Ben Said Massounde in a coup d'état. His troops justified the coup on the basis of protecting territorial integrity after Massounde had begun negotiations with representatives of the island of Anjouan for greater autonomy or independence. This was despite the fact that an international conference in Antananarivo had resulted in a settlement on the matter between the three islands of the Comoros, although the government of Anjouan had delayed ratifying the agreement.

On 23 December 2001, Assoumani's new proposed constitution was adopted by referendum. The constitution established a rotating presidency and granted considerable autonomy to the Comorian islands, each of which gained its own basic law, flag and executive branch of government. It also renamed the country from the Federal Islamic Republic of the Comoros to the Union of the Comoros and redesigned the national flag to remove its religious inscriptions and become multicolour, as can be seen today.

Assoumani announced elections for 2002, with violent clashes between state forces and the opposition erupting across the country during the campaign. Reports of arbitrary arrests also emerged. Assoumani resigned from his position as President of the Council of State on 21 January 2002, in order to run for President of the Union of the Comoros and was succeeded by Hamada Madi. Assoumani was then elected president with 75% of the vote in the multiparty 2002 Comorian presidential election, and was inaugurated on 26 May 2002.

Assoumani's presidency was marked by conflicts over jurisdiction and political gridlock due to his refusal to devolve power to the autonomous regions of the Comoros, as mandated by the constitution. The latter also required that successive presidents be from different islands, allowing Ahmed Abdallah Mohamed Sambi from Anjouan to succeed him after winning the 2006 presidential election.

Assoumani launched a second presidential bid in the 2016 presidential election. In the first round on 21 February, he came third with 14.96% of the vote, before winning the second round with 40.98% of the vote on 10 April. However, both Assoumani and his opponent Mohamed Ali Solihi disputed the election result, alleging irregularities and electoral fraud in the second round. Assoumani demanded the invalidation of ballots from most of the polling stations on Anjouan in particular. Consequently, a third round of voting took place on 11 May. The Constitutional Court declared Assoumani the winner with 41.43% of the vote on 15 May, and he took office on 26 May for a five-year term. His first vice-president was Djaffar Ahmed Said, the former attorney-general and director of judicial affairs, who was later replaced by Moustadroine Aboudou from Anjouan and then Abdallah Said Sarouma from Mohéli.

During his tenure, the opposition accused Assoumani of having amended the constitution to remain in power until 2029. In addition, his closing of the Constitutional Court and Anti-Corruption Court caused the European Union to suspend all cooperation with the Comoros in protest.

On 13 February 2019, Assoumani resigned the presidency to campaign for re-election in the 2019 Comorian presidential election on 24 March. He was elected in the first round and assumed office again on 3 April.

Assoumani was reelected for another term as president in the 2024 Comorian presidential election. which was marred by allegations of fraud and post-election violence in Moroni. On 7 August 2024, Assoumani granted extensive powers to his son and presumed successor Nour El Fath, allowing him to intervene at several stages of the government decision-making process.

On 13 September 2024, Assoumani was slightly injured after being stabbed at a funeral in Salimani, outside Moroni. The suspect, who was later identified as a 24-year old soldier named Ahmed Abdou, was arrested but was found dead in his prison cell the next day.

In January 2025, the ruling party of president Azali Assoumani won parliamentary election, taking 28 out of 33 parliamentary seats. The opposition parties rejected the results.

== Diplomacy ==
In 2022, Assoumani was invited by President Paul Biya of Cameroon to open the 2021 Africa Cup of Nations at Olembe Stadium, Yaoundé. On 28 September 2022, on the occasion of the state funeral for Shinzo Abe, Japan's former prime minister, in Tokyo, Assoumani was one of only seven heads of state who met with Japanese Emperor Naruhito. In July 2023, Assoumani, also in his capacity as Chairperson of the African Union, attended the 2023 Russia–Africa Summit in St. Petersburg in which Russian President Vladimir Putin attempted to continue efforts to posture Russia as a more attractive ally to African partner states than Western liberal democracies.

== See also ==
- List of current heads of state and government
- List of heads of the executive by approval rating

Political offices
Preceded by Tadjidine Ben Said Massounde; Acting	President of the Comoros; 1999–2002	Succeeded by Hamada Madi; Acting
Preceded by Hamada Madi; Acting	President of the Comoros; 2002–2006	Succeeded by Ahmed Abdallah Mohamed Sambi
Preceded by Ikililou Dhoinine	President of the Comoros; 2016–present	Incumbent
