= List of political parties in the Comoros =

Overview of Comorian political parties

The Comoros does not have a strong party system. Political groups are formed mainly in support of certain leaders. The only major ideological point of contention is the debate between supporters of a strong federal government and supporters of the autonomous island governments.

== Parties ==
=== Parliamentary parties ===
Party	Abbr.	Ideology	Created	Assembly
Convention for the Renewal of the Comoros; Convention pour le Renouveau des Comores	CRC	Social democracy; Democratic socialism	2002	31 / 33
Party for the Reform of Institutions; Parti pour la Réforme des Institutions	PARI		2024	1 / 33

=== Other parties ===
Other parties
Name	Native name	Ideology	Notes
Comorian Union for Progress	Union Comorienne pour le Progrès	Nationalism	Formerly defunct party.
Democratic Rally of the Comoros	Rassemblement Démocratique des Comores	?	Formed by former Grande Comore governor Mouigni Baraka.
Islands' Fraternity and Unity Party	Chama cha Upvamodja na Mugangna wa Massiwa	Anti-Federalism	Opposed the creation of a federal Comoros.
Juwa Party	Parti Juwa	Populism Anti-imperialism Secularism|| Formed by former president Ahmed Abdallah Mohamed Sambi.	
National Front for Justice	Front National pour la Justice	Islamism; Islamic democracy	Formed by former president Ahmed Abdallah Mohamed Sambi.
Orange Party	Parti Orange	Social democracy	
Party for the Comorian Agreement	Parti pour l'Entente Comorienne	?	Former parliamentary party.
Rally for an Alternative of Harmonious and Integrated Development	Rassemblement pour une Alternative de Développement Harmonieux et Intégré	?	Former parliamentary party.
Rally for Democracy and Renewal	Rassemblement pour la Démocratie et le Renouveau	?	Formed by former president Said Mohamed Djohar.
Union for the Development of the Comoros	Union pour le Développement des Comores	?	Political alliance.

=== Former parties ===
Former parties
Name	Native name	Ideology	Notes
Camp of the Autonomous Islands	Camp des Îles Autonomes	Autonomism	Political alliance.
Comorian Democratic Union	Union Démocratique des Comores	?	Referred to as the "Green Party" because of their use of green ballots.
Comorian Party for Democracy and Progress	Parti Comrorien pour la Démocratie et le Progrès	?	N/A
Comorian Popular Front	Front Popular Comorien	?	N/A
Democratic Front of the Comoros	Front Démocratique des Comores	?	Originated as an exile group.
Democratic Rally of the Comorian People	Rassemblement Démocratique des Peuples Comoriens	?	Referred to as the "White Party" because of their use of white ballots.
Dialogue Proposition Action	DPA-Mwangaza	?	N/A
Maecha Bora	Maecha Bora	?	Participated in the government of Said Mohamed Djohar
Movement for Democracy and Progress	Mouvement pour la Démocratie et le Progrès	Autonomism	Member of the Camp of the Autonomous Islands.
Movement for Renewal and Democratic Action	Mouvement pour la Renovation et l'Action Democratique	?	N/A
Movement for the Comoros	Mouvement pour les Comores	?	N/A
National Rally for Development	Rassemblement National pour le Développement	Autonomism	Member of the Camp of the Autonomous Islands.
National Union for Democracy in the Comoros	Union Nationale pour la Démocratie aux Comores	?	N/A
Nguzo	Nguzo	?	N/A
Party for National Salvation	Parti pour le Salut National	Islamism; Islamic democracy	Supported Said Mohamed Djohar.
Rally for Change and Democracy	Rassemblement pour le Changement et la Démocratie	?	Participated in the government of Caabi El-Yachroutu Mohamed.
Realising Freedom's Capability	Uwezo	?	Founded by former foreign minister Abdallah Mouazoir.
Twamaya	Twamaya	?	N/A
Union of Democrats for Development	Union des Démocrates pour le Développement	?	N/A

== See also ==
- Lists of political parties
