= List of politicians from the Comoros =

The following is a list of Comorian politicians, both past and present.

== A ==
- Abdallah, Ahmed
- Abdou, Ahmed
- Abdoulwahab, Mohamed
- Ahmed, Mohamed
- Ali, Said Ibrahim Ben
- Ali, Salim Ben
- Assoumani, Azali
- Atthoumani, Said
- Attoumane, Ahmed Ben Cheikh
- Ayouba, Combo

== B ==
- Bacar, Mohamed
- Bourhane, Nourdine

== C ==
- Chebani, Haribon
- Cheikh, Said Mohamed

== D ==
- Djohar, Said Mohamed
- Djoussouf, Abbas

== E ==
- El-Yachourtu, Caabi
- Elamine, Soeuf Mohamed
- Elbak, Abdou Soule

== F ==
- Fazul, Mohamed Said

== H ==
- Halidi, Dhoihirou
- Halidi, Ibrahim Abderamane
- Hamadi, Hassane
- Houmadi, Halifa
- Houmadi, Kaambi

== J ==
- Jaffar, Said Mohamed

== K ==
- Kafe, Said
- Siti Kassim
- Kemal, Said Ali

== L ==
- Larifou, Said

== M ==
- Madi, Hamada
- Madi, Mohamed Abdou
- Maecha, Mtara
- Massounde, Tadjidine Ben Said
- Mohamed, Abdallah
- Mradabi, Mahamoud
- Mroudjae, Ali

== S ==
- Said, Mohamed Ali
- Soefou, Aboudou
- Soilih, Ali

== T ==
- Taki, Mohamed
- Tarmidi, Bianrifi
