= Elections in the Comoros =

Elections in the Comoros take place within the framework of a multi-party democracy and a presidential system. The President and the majority of the seats in the Assembly of the Union are directly elected.

== Latest election ==
Party	Votes	%	Seats
Convention for the Renewal of the Comoros	114,261	69.60	31
Orange Party	8,104	4.94	0
Party for the Reform of Institutions	6,674	4.07	1
Democratic Rally of the Comoros	2,513	1.53	0
Twamaya Yahe Komori	2,496	1.52	0
Swauti	711	0.43	0
Independent	29,404	17.91	1
Total	164,163	100.00	33

== Electoral history ==
Following World War II, the Comoros began to elect representatives to the French National Assembly, with Saïd Mohamed Cheikh elected from the islands in 1945. The following year the islands elected a General Council for the first time. In 1952 the Council became the Territorial Assembly, and in 1962 became the Chamber of Deputies.

Following independence in the mid-1970s, presidential elections were held in October 1978, with Ahmed Abdallah as the sole candidate. In parliamentary elections in December that year all candidates ran as independents. Shortly before the 1982 parliamentary elections the Comorian Union for Progress (Uzdima) had been declared the sole legal party, and won 37 of the 38 seats, with the remaining one going to an independent. Abdallah was again the sole candidate in the 1984 presidential elections, whilst the 1987 parliamentary elections saw Uzima win all 42 seats.

Multi-party politics was reintroduced in 1990 and Said Mohamed Djohar of Udzima won the presidential elections that year, beating Mohamed Taki Abdoulkarim of the National Union for Democracy in the Comoros in the second round, having finished as runner-up in the first round. The 1992 parliamentary elections produced a fragmented legislature, with 14 parties winning seats and none holding more than seven. Early elections the following year produced a majority for the pro-presidential Rally for Democracy and Renewal, which won 28 of the 42 seats.

The 1996 presidential elections were won by Abdoulkarim, and the parliamentary elections later in the year saw the pro-Abdoulkarim National Rally for Development win 36 of the 43 seats amidst an opposition boycott. As a result of a coup, the next presidential elections were not held until 2002, with independent candidate Azali Assoumani elected unopposed in the second round after his opponents boycotted it. However, parliamentary elections in 2004 resulted in a victory for the opposition Camp of the Autonomous Islands. The 2006 presidential elections were won by Ahmed Abdallah Mohamed Sambi. The parliamentary elections in 2009 were won by the Baobab movement supportive of the President.

Presidential elections in 2010 saw Ikililou Dhoinine elected president. The delayed 2015 parliamentary elections produced another fragmented Assembly, with the Union for the Development of the Comoros emerging as the largest party with eight seats.

== Electoral system ==
=== President ===
The President of the Comoros is elected for a five-year term the two-round system. Prior to a 2018 referendum that amended the electoral system, the presidency rotated between the Comoros' three main islands; Anjouan, Grande Comore and Mohéli; when it was an island's turn to hold the presidency, the first round was held on that island, with the top three candidates progressing to a nationwide second round.

=== Assembly of the Union ===
The 33 seats in the Assembly of the Union are divided into 24 seats directly elected in single-member constituencies using the two-round system, and nine seats elected by the Island assemblies, each of which elect three members.

== Referendums ==
Several referendums have been held in the Comoros. In 1958 the islands voted in favour of the new French constitution, which resulted in them becoming part of the French Community (rejection would have led to independence). An independence referendum was held in 1974, which resulted in a large majority (95%) in favour of independence. However, one island, Mayotte, voted against referendum, and was subsequently separated from the rest of the Comoros to remain under French control.

Following independence, a referendum was held on the continued presidency of Ali Soilih in October 1977; despite a vote in favour, Soilih was overthrown the following May. Following his overthrow, a constitutional referendum was held, with 99% of voters voting in favour of the new constitution. Further constitutional referendums were held in 1989, 1992, 1996, 2001, 2009 and 2018.
