= List of elections in 1978 =

The following elections occurred in the year 1978.

== Africa ==
- 1978 Cameroonian parliamentary election
- 1978 Comorian legislative election
- 1978 Comorian presidential election
- 1978 Comorian constitutional referendum
- 1978 Egyptian protection of national unity and social peace referendum
- 1978 Ghanaian governmental referendum
- 1978 Kenyan presidential election
- 1978 Malawian general election
- 1978 Rwandan constitutional referendum
- 1978 Rwandan presidential election
- 1978 Senegalese general election
- 1978 Sierra Leonean constitutional referendum
- 1978 South African presidential election
- 1978 South West African legislative election
- 1978 Sudanese parliamentary election
- 1978 Swazi general election
- 1978 Upper Voltan parliamentary election
- 1978 Upper Voltan presidential election
- 1978 Zambian general election

== Asia ==
- 1978 Bangladeshi presidential election
- 1978 Burmese general election
- 1978 Cypriot presidential election
- 1978 Israeli municipal elections
- 1978 Israeli presidential election
- 1978 Malaysian general election
- 1978 Maldivian presidential election
- 1978 Philippine parliamentary election
- 1978 Philippine parliamentary sectoral election
- 1978 Singaporean presidential election
- 1978 South Korean legislative election
- 1978 South Korean presidential election
- 1978 South Yemeni parliamentary election
- 1978 Syrian presidential election
- 1978 Taiwan presidential election

== Australia ==
- 1978 Earlwood state by-election
- 1978 New South Wales state election
- 1978 Werriwa by-election

== Europe ==
- 1978 Albanian parliamentary election
- 1978 Andorran political reform referendum
- 1978 Andorran supplementary parliamentary election
- 1978 Austrian nuclear power referendum
- 1978 Belgian general election
- 1978 Danish electoral age referendum
- 1978 Danish local elections
- 1978 Faroese general election
- 1978 Finnish presidential election
- 1978 Icelandic parliamentary election
- 1978 Italian presidential election
- 1978 Italian referendums
- 1978 Liechtenstein general election
- 1978 Monegasque general election
- 1978 San Marino general election
- 1978 Shetland referendum
- 1978 Spanish constitutional referendum
- 1978 Swiss referendums
- 1978 Yugoslavian parliamentary election
- Vatican: two conclaves:
  - August 1978 conclave
  - October 1978 conclave

=== France ===
- 1978 French legislative election

=== Germany ===
- de:Bürgerschaftswahl in Hamburg 1978 (Hamburg)
- de:Landtagswahl in Niedersachsen 1978 (Lower Saxony)
- de:Landtagswahl in Hessen 1978 (Hesse)
- de:Landtagswahl in Bayern 1978 (Bavaria)

== North America ==
- 1978 Costa Rican general election
- 1978 Dominican presidential election
- 1978 Dominican Republic general election
- Greenlandic alcohol referendum
- 1978 Guatemalan general election
- 1978 Panamanian parliamentary election
- 1978 Panamanian presidential election
- 1978 Salvadoran legislative election

=== Canada ===
- 1978 Brantford municipal election
- 1978 New Brunswick general election
- 1978 Ontario municipal elections
- 1978 Ottawa municipal election
- 1978 Prince Edward Island general election
- 1978 Saskatchewan general election
- 1978 Toronto municipal election
- 1978 Yukon general election

=== United States ===
- 1978 United States elections

==== United States lieutenant gubernatorial ====
- 1978 California lieutenant gubernatorial election
- 1978 Georgia lieutenant gubernatorial election
- 1978 Texas lieutenant gubernatorial election

==== United States gubernatorial ====
- 1978 Alabama gubernatorial election
- 1978 Alaska gubernatorial election
- 1978 Arizona gubernatorial election
- 1978 Arkansas gubernatorial election
- 1978 California gubernatorial election
- 1978 Colorado gubernatorial election
- 1978 Connecticut gubernatorial election
- 1978 Florida gubernatorial election
- 1978 Georgia gubernatorial election
- 1978 Hawaii gubernatorial election
- 1978 Idaho gubernatorial election
- 1978 Iowa gubernatorial election
- 1978 Kansas gubernatorial election
- 1978 Maine gubernatorial election
- 1978 Maryland gubernatorial election
- 1978 Massachusetts gubernatorial election
- 1978 Michigan gubernatorial election
- 1978 Minnesota gubernatorial election
- 1978 Nebraska gubernatorial election
- 1978 Nevada gubernatorial election
- 1978 New Hampshire gubernatorial election
- 1978 New Mexico gubernatorial election
- 1978 New York gubernatorial election
- 1978 Ohio gubernatorial election
- 1978 Oklahoma gubernatorial election
- 1978 Oregon gubernatorial election
- 1978 Pennsylvania gubernatorial election
- 1978 Rhode Island gubernatorial election
- 1978 South Carolina gubernatorial election
- 1978 South Dakota gubernatorial election
- 1978 Tennessee gubernatorial election
- 1978 Texas gubernatorial election
- 1978 United States gubernatorial elections
- 1978 Vermont gubernatorial election
- 1978 Wisconsin gubernatorial election
- 1978 Wyoming gubernatorial election

==== United States House of Representatives ====
- 1978 United States House of Representatives elections
- 1978 United States House of Representatives election in Alaska
- 1978 United States House of Representatives election in Delaware
- 1978 United States House of Representatives election in Nevada
- 1978 United States House of Representatives election in North Dakota
- 1978 United States House of Representatives election in Vermont
- 1978 United States House of Representatives election in Wyoming

==== United States Senate ====
- 1978 United States Senate elections
- 1978 United States Senate election in Alabama
- 1978 United States Senate special election in Alabama
- 1978 United States Senate election in Alaska
- 1978 United States Senate election in Arkansas
- 1978 United States Senate election in Colorado
- 1978 United States Senate election in Delaware
- 1978 United States Senate election in Georgia
- 1978 United States Senate election in Idaho
- 1978 United States Senate election in Illinois
- 1978 United States Senate election in Iowa
- 1978 United States Senate election in Kansas
- 1978 United States Senate election in Kentucky
- 1978 United States Senate election in Louisiana
- 1978 United States Senate election in Maine
- 1978 United States Senate election in Massachusetts
- 1978 United States Senate election in Michigan
- 1978 United States Senate election in Minnesota
- 1978 United States Senate special election in Minnesota
- 1978 United States Senate election in Mississippi
- 1978 United States Senate election in Montana
- 1978 United States Senate election in Nebraska
- 1978 United States Senate election in New Hampshire
- 1978 United States Senate election in New Jersey
- 1978 United States Senate election in New Mexico
- 1978 United States Senate election in North Carolina
- 1978 United States Senate election in Oklahoma
- 1978 United States Senate election in Oregon
- 1978 United States Senate election in Rhode Island
- 1978 United States Senate election in South Carolina
- 1978 United States Senate election in South Dakota
- 1978 United States Senate election in Tennessee
- 1978 United States Senate election in Texas
- 1978 United States Senate election in Virginia
- 1978 United States Senate election in West Virginia
- 1978 United States Senate election in Wyoming

==== United States mayoral elections ====
- 1978 Anchorage mayoral election
- 1978 Cleveland mayoral recall election
- 1978 San Jose mayoral election
- 1978 Washington, D.C., mayoral election

== Oceania ==
- 1978 American Samoan referendum
- 1978 Cook Islands general election
- 1978 New Zealand general election
- 1978 Tongan general election
- 1978 Trust Territory of the Pacific Islands constitutional referendum
- 1978 Rangitikei by-election

=== Australia ===
- 1978 Earlwood state by-election
- 1978 New South Wales state election
- 1978 Werriwa by-election

== South America ==
- 1978 Bolivian general election
- 1978 Brazilian legislative election
- 1978 Brazilian presidential election
- 1978 Chilean national consultation
- 1978 Colombian parliamentary election
- 1978 Colombian presidential election
- 1978 Ecuadorian constitutional referendum
- 1978–79 Ecuadorian general election
- 1978 Guyanese constitutional referendum
- 1978 Peruvian Constituent Assembly election
- 1978 Venezuelan presidential election
