= List of prime ministers of the Comoros =

Prime Minister of the Comoros
- قائمة رؤساء حكومات جزر القمر (Arabic); Premier Ministre des Comores (French)
- National Seal
- Formation: 13 August 1957; 69 years ago
- First holder: Mohamed Ahmed
- Final holder: Hamada Madi
- Abolished: 15 April 2002; 24 years ago

This article lists the prime ministers of the Comoros since 1957, to the abolition of the post of Prime Minister in 2002.

== List of officeholders ==
(Dates in italics indicate de facto continuation of office)

Tenure	Portrait	Incumbent	Affiliation	Notes
French Suzerainty
French overseas territory
13 August 1957 to 1 January 1962		Mohamed Ahmed, Vice President of the Government Council	PV	
1 January 1962 to 16 March 1970		Saïd Mohamed Cheikh, President of the Government Council	PV	Died in office
2 April 1970 to 16 June 1972		Saïd Ibrahim Ben Ali, President of the Government Council	PB	
16 June 1972 to 26 December 1972		Said Mohamed Jaffar, President of the Government Council	RDPC	
26 December 1972 to 6 July 1975		Ahmed Abdallah, President of the Government Council	UDC	
State of Comoros	Independence from France			
(Etat Comorien)
7 January 1976 to 24 May 1978		Abdallah Mohamed, Prime Minister	UDC	
Federal and Islamic Republic of Comoros
(République Fédérale Islamique des Comores)
(Jumhuriyat al-Qumur al-Itthadiyah al-Islamiyah)
24 May 1978 to 22 December 1978		Abdallah Mohamed, Prime Minister	UDC	(contd.)
22 December 1978 to 8 February 1982		Salim Ben Ali, Prime Minister	UCP	
8 February 1982 to 31 December 1984		Ali Mroudjaé, Prime Minister	UCP	
31 December 1984 to 7 January 1992	Post abolished			
7 January 1992 to 15 July 1992		Mohamed Taki Abdoulkarim, Prime Minister	RND	
15 July 1992 to 1 January 1993	Vacant			
1 January 1993 to 26 May 1993		Ibrahim Halidi, Prime Minister	UDD	
26 May 1993 to 19 June 1993		Said Ali Mohamed, Prime Minister	RND	
20 June 1993 to 2 January 1994		Ahmed Ben Cheikh Attoumane, Prime Minister	RDR	
2 January 1994 to 14 October 1994		Mohamed Abdou Madi, Prime Minister	RDR	
14 October 1994 to 29 April 1995		Halifa Houmadi, Prime Minister	RDR	
29 April 1995 to 27 March 1996		Caabi El-Yachroutu Mohamed, Prime Minister	RDR	
27 March 1996 to 27 December 1996		Tadjidine Ben Said Massounde, Prime Minister	n-p	
27 December 1996 to 9 September 1997		Ahmed Abdou, Prime Minister	RND	
7 December 1997 to 30 May 1998		Nourdine Bourhane, Prime Minister	n-p	
30 May 1998 to 22 November 1998	Vacant			
22 November 1998 to 30 April 1999		Abbas Djoussouf, Prime Minister	FNR	Deposed in a coup d'état
30 April 1999 to 7 December 1999	Vacant			
2 December 1999 to 29 November 2000		Bianrifi Tarmidi, Prime Minister	n-p	
29 November 2000 to 23 December 2001		Hamada Madi, Prime Minister	PRC	
Union of Comoros (Union des Comores)
الاتحاد القمر (Udzima wa Komori)
23 December 2001 to 15 April 2002		Hamada Madi, Prime Minister	PRC	(contd.)
15 April 2002 to present	Post abolished			

== Affiliations ==
- PV – Green Party
- PB – White Party
- RDPC – Democratic Assembly of the Comoran People (renamed White Party)
- UDC – Comoros Democratic Union (renamed Green Party)
- UCP – Comorian Union for Progress
- RND – National Rally for Development
- UDD – Union of Democrats for Democracy
- RDR – Rally for Democracy and Renewal
- FNR – Forum of National Recovery
- PRC – Republican Party of the Comoros
- n-p – Nonpartisan

== See also ==
- History of the Comoros
- Politics of the Comoros
- List of sultans in the Comoros
- List of colonial governors of the Comoros
- List of heads of state of the Comoros
- Vice-President of the Comoros
