= Movement for Democracy and Progress (Comoros) =

The Movement for Democracy and Progress (French: Mouvement pour la Démocratie et le Progrès, MDP), also known as the People's Democratic Movement (Mouvement Démocratique Populaire) was a political party in the Comoros.

== History ==
Based in Moroni, the party campaigned for the constitution approved in a 1992 referendum, and contested the subsequent parliamentary elections later in the year. Although the party received the highest vote share at 10.4%, it won only three seats in the Assembly of the Union, whilst the Union of Democrats for Development won seven seats.

In the early parliamentary elections the following year the party won only two seats. In 1994 the MDP joined with other opposition to form the Forum for National Recovery (FRN), an alliance opposed to President Said Mohamed Djohar.

The MDP nominated Abbas Djoussouf as its candidate for the 1996 presidential elections. Djoussouf finished second in the first round of voting, progressing to the runoff, where he was defeated by UDD candidate Mohamed Taki Abdoulkarim by a margin of 64%–36%. The MDP subsequently boycotted the parliamentary elections later in the year. However, Djoussouf was appointed prime minister in November 1998. Following a coup in 1999, the MDP left the FRN, as some member parties had supported the coup.

Djoussouf was the MDP candidate again for the 2002 presidential elections, but finished fourth out of the nine candidates in the first round. Prior to the 2004 parliamentary elections the MDP joined the Camp of the Autonomous Islands alliance. The alliance won 12 of the 18 elected and all 15 of the indirectly-elected seats.
