= Islands' Fraternity and Unity Party =

Political party in the Comoros

The Islands' Fraternity and Unity Party (Comorian: Chama cha Upvamodja na Mugangna wa Massiwa, CHUMA) is a political party in the Comoros.

== History ==
The party was formed in Paris in the 1980s by the National Committee for Public Salvation led by Saïd Ali Kemal, the Comorian National United Front and the Union of Comorians.

CHUMA nominated Kemal as its candidate for the 1990 presidential elections. Kemal finished third of out eight candidates with 13.7% of the vote. In the 1992 parliamentary elections the party received 6.2% of the vote, winning three of the 42 seats. However, in the early parliamentary elections the following year CHUMA was reduced to a single seat.

Kemal briefly served as acting president in 1995, and was the party's candidate again for the 1996 presidential elections, finishing fourth out of 15 candidates with 8.7% of the vote. The party boycotted the parliamentary elections later in the year.

The party campaigned for a "no" vote in the 2001 constitutional referendum, but the new constitution was approved by 77% of voters. Kemal ran for the presidency again in the 2002 elections. Although he finished in third place in the primary election on Grande Comore and was entitled to contest the national elections, he opted to boycott the vote. Prior to the 2004 parliamentary elections the party joined the Camp of the Autonomous Islands alliance, which won 27 of the 33 seats.

The party did not put forward a candidate for the 2006 presidential elections, but instead backed Ibrahim Halidi of the Movement for the Comoros, with Kemal being one of his running mates. Halidi finished second in the elections. In the 2010 presidential elections the party supported the victorious Ikililou Dhoinine. CHUMA received only 277 votes in the 2015 parliamentary elections, failing to win a seat.
