= National Rally for Development =

The National Rally for Development (French: Rassemblement National pour le Développement, RND) was a political party in the Comoros.

== History ==
The RND was established on 6 October 1996 as a merger of the National Union for Democracy in the Comoros, Maecha Bora, Realising Freedom's Capability, the Comorian Union for Progress and the Rally for Democracy and Renewal. The founding of the RND had been suggested by President Mohamed Taki Abdoulkarim in August 1996 following his victory in the presidential elections earlier in the year.

The party won 36 of the 43 seats in the Assembly of the Union in the December 1996 parliamentary elections, although the elections were boycotted by most opposition parties.

Despite its landslide victory, the party began to suffer internal splits. Following the 1999 coup one faction supported the new regime headed by Azali Assoumani, whilst another called for the reinstatement of temporary head of state Tadjidine Ben Said Massounde.

In the 2002 presidential elections Mtara Maécha stood as the RND–Renewal candidate, finishing fifth out of nine candidates with 8% of the vote, whilst Azali emerged victorious.

Prior to the 2004 parliamentary elections the RND joined the Camp of the Autonomous Islands alliance, which was opposed to Azali. The alliance won 12 of the 18 elected seats and all 15 of the indirectly-elected seats
