= 1990 Comorian presidential election =

Election of Said Mohamed Djohar

- 4 March 1990 (first round); 11 March 1990 (second round)
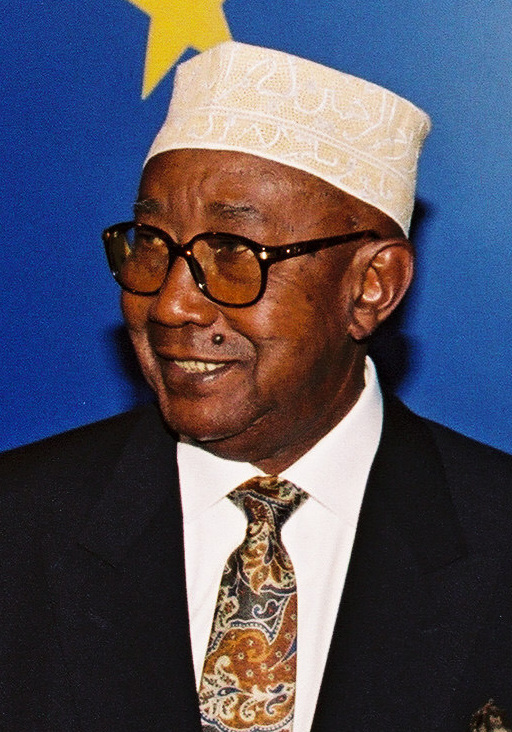

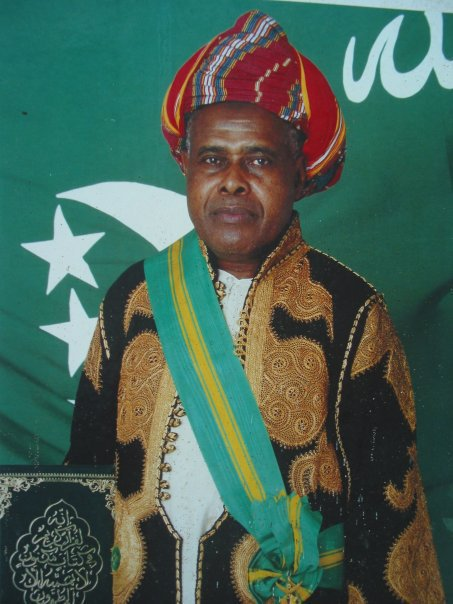
Nominee	Said Mohamed Djohar	Mohamed Taki Abdoulkarim
Party	UCP	UNDC
Popular vote	103,244	84,178
Percentage	55.09%	44.91%
President before election
Said Mohamed Djohar
RDR
Elected President
Said Mohamed Djohar
UCP

Presidential elections were held in the Comoros on 4 March 1990, with a second round on 11 March. The elections had originally been scheduled for January, but were postponed, resulting in demonstrations. Elections were held on 18 February, but were abandoned due to fraud allegations.

Although Mohamed Taki Abdoulkarim of the opposition National Union for Democracy in the Comoros received the most votes in the first round, incumbent President Said Mohamed Djohar of the Comorian Union for Progress won with 55% of the vote in the second round. They were the first multi-party elections in the Comoros since independence.

Voter turnout was 63.7% in the first round and 60.2% in the second.

== Results ==
Candidate	Party	First round		Second round	
Candidate	Party	Votes	%	Votes	%
Mohamed Taki Abdoulkarim	National Union for Democracy in the Comoros	47,329	25.49	84,178	44.91
Said Mohamed Djohar	Comorian Union for Progress	44,845	24.15	103,244	55.09
Saïd Ali Kemal	Islands' Fraternity and Unity Party	26,656	14.36		
Abbas Djoussouf	Movement for Democracy and Progress	26,379	14.21		
Moustoifa Said Cheikh	Democratic Front of the Comoros	17,739	9.55		
Ali Mroudjaé	Comorian Party for Democracy and Progress	8,867	4.78		
Mohamed Hassanali	Comorian Popular Front	8,867	4.78		
Mohamed Ali Mbalia	Socialist Party of the Comoros	4,989	2.69		
Total		185,671	100.00	187,422	100.00
Valid votes		185,671	98.54	187,422	98.60
Invalid/blank votes		2,753	1.46	2,652	1.40
Total votes		188,424	100.00	190,074	100.00
Registered voters/turnout		310,925	60.60	315,391	60.27
Source: Nohlen et al.
