= 1996 Comorian presidential election =

Election of Mohamed Taki Abdoulkarim

- 6 March 1996 (first round); 16 March 1996 (second round)
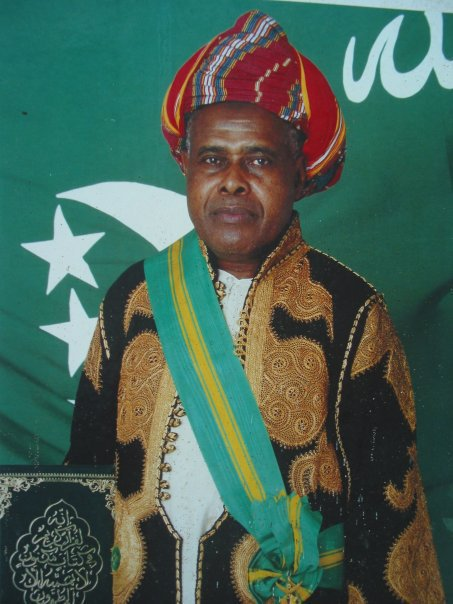

Nominee	Mohamed Taki Abdoulkarim	Abbas Djoussouf
Party	UNDC	MDP
Percentage	64.3%	35.7%
President before election
Said Mohamed Djohar
RDR
Elected President
Mohamed Taki Abdoulkarim
UNDC

Presidential elections were held in the Comoros on 6 March 1996, with a second round on 16 March. The result was a victory for Mohamed Taki Abdoulkarim, who had come second in the 1990 elections (despite winning the most votes in the first round), and who had briefly served as acting President in October 1995 in the aftermath of another coup attempt led by Bob Denard.

== Results ==
Candidate	Party	First round		Second round	
Candidate	Party	Votes	%	Votes	%
Mohamed Taki Abdoulkarim	National Union for Democracy in the Comoros		21.3		64.3
Abbas Djoussouf	Movement for Democracy and Progress		15.7		35.7
Omar Tamou	Comorian Union for Progress		13.3		
Saïd Ali Kemal	Islands' Fraternity and Unity Party		8.7		
Halifa Houmadi			2.3		
Mtara Maécha	Comorian Union for Progress		38.7		
Mouzawar Abdallah	Realising Freedom's Capability		38.7		
Mahamed Adamo	Rally for Democracy and Renewal		38.7		
Said Hassane Said Hachim	Rally for Change and Democracy		38.7		
Six other candidates			38.7		
Total					
Source: Nohlen
