= Democratic Front of the Comoros =

Political party in the Comoros

The Democratic Front of the Comoros (French: Front Démocratique des Comores, FDC) was a political party in the Comoros.

== History ==
The FDC began its existence as an exile group, and was initially led by Mustapha Saïd Cheikh, who had been imprisoned for involvement in a coup attempt in 1985. The party was invited to join Said Mohamed Djohar's government in 1990, and campaigned for the proposed new constitution in the 1992 referendum.

The party finished third in the popular vote in the parliamentary elections later in the year, but won only two seats. Both seats were lost in the early elections in 1993.

Cheikh was the FDC candidate for the 2002 presidential elections, but finished last in a nine-candidate field. The party subsequently joined the Camp of the Autonomous Islands alliance prior to the 2004 parliamentary elections. The alliance won 12 of the 18 elected seats and all 15 of the indirectly elected seats.
