= 1970 Comoros by-election =

Election to the French National Assembly

A by-election to the French National Assembly was held in the Comoros on 12 July 1970, following the resignation of Saïd Ibrahim Ben Ali after he became Prime Minister of the Comoros. The result was a victory for Mohamed Dahalani of the List for the Fifth Republic.

== Results ==
Candidate	Party	Votes	%
Mohamed Dahalani	List for the Fifth Republic	43,902	53.24
Ali Mroudjaé	Democratic Rally of the Comorian People	38,560	46.76
Total		82,462	100.00
Source: Sternberger et al.
