= National Union for Democracy in the Comoros =

Political party in the Comoros

The National Union for Democracy in the Comoros (French: Union Nationale pour la Démocratie aux Comores, UNDC) was a political party in the Comoros.

== History ==
The UNDC nominated Mohamed Taki Abdoulkarim as its candidate for the 1990 presidential elections. Although Taki received the most votes in the first round, he was defeated by incumbent President Said Mohamed Djohar in the second round by a margin of 55–45%.

The party boycotted the 1992 parliamentary elections when the government refused to update the voter roll. However, it contested the early elections in 1993, winning four seats.

Taki was the party's candidate for the 1996 presidential elections, this time defeating Abbas Djoussouf in the runoff with 64% of the vote.

Following a suggestion from Taki, on 6 October 1996 the party merged with several members of the Forum for National Recovery to form the National Rally for Development. The founding of the RND had been suggested by President Mohamed Taki Abdoulkarim in August 1996 following his victory in the presidential elections earlier in the year.
