= Realising Freedom's Capability =

Political party in the Comoros

Realising Freedom's Capability, also known as Uwezo (Leadership), was a political party in the Comoros.

== History ==
The party was established in Paris by former Foreign Minister Mouzawar Abdallah in 1984 as the Union for a Democratic Republic in the Comoros (Union pour une République Démocratique aux Comores, URDC). In 1990 it was reorganised as UWEZO. The party was part of the "no" camp for the 1992 constitutional referendum. It won a single seat in the 1992 parliamentary elections, and retained it in early elections the following year.

The party nominated Mouzawar as its candidate for the 1996 presidential elections. Abdallah failed to make the second round. Later in 1996 it was one of several parties that merged to form the National Rally for Development.
