= 1973 French legislative election in the Comoros =

Elections to the French National Assembly were held in the Comoros on 4 March 1973 as part of the wider French parliamentary elections. The result was a victory for the List for the French Republic, which won both seats. The seats were taken by Mohamed Dahalani and Mohamed Ahmed.

== Results ==
Party	Votes	%	Seats	+/–
List for the Fifth Republic	107,424	100.00	2	0
Total	107,424	100.00	2	0
Valid votes	107,424	99.68		
Invalid/blank votes	341	0.32		
Total votes	107,765	100.00		
Registered voters/turnout	133,284	80.85		
Source: Sternberger et al.
