= FNJ =

FNJ may refer to:

- Federation of Nepalese Journalists
- First Navy Jack
- National Front for Justice (French: Front National pour la Justice), a political party in Comoros
- National Front Youth (French: Front National de la Jeunesse), the youth wing of the French National Front
- Pyongyang International Airport (IATA: FNJ), in North Korea
