= November 1946 French legislative election in the Comoros =

Elections to the French National Assembly were held in the Comoros on 10 November 1946. The territory elected a single seat, with Saïd Mohamed Cheikh re-elected unopposed.

== Results ==
Candidate	Votes	%
Saïd Mohamed Cheikh	5,526	100.00
Total	5,526	100.00
Valid votes	5,526	99.32
Invalid/blank votes	38	0.68
Total votes	5,564	100.00
Registered voters/turnout	8,270	67.28
Source: Sternberger et al.
