= Maecha Bora =

Maecha Bora was a political party in the Comoros.

== History ==
The party had ministers in the government formed by President Said Mohamed Djohar on 6 January 1992. In the March 1992 parliamentary elections it finished fourth in the popular vote, winning three seats in the Assembly of the Union. However, the party failed to win a seat in the early elections the following year.

In 1996 Maecha Bora was one of several parties that merged to form the National Rally for Development.
