= Mouzawar Abdallah =

Comoros politician (1941-2020)

Minister of Foreign Affairs
- In office 1976–1978

Personal details
- Born: 1941 Moroni, French Comoros
- Died: 30 April 2020 (aged 78–79) Moroni, Comoros
- Party: Democratic Rally of the Comorian People; Parti Blanc

Mouzawar Abdallah (1941 – 30 April 2020) was a Comorian politician.

== Biography ==
Abdallah earned a degree in psychology from the University of Lyon in 1966, and worked as a primary school principal starting in 1967.

Abdallah was a leader in the Democratic Rally of the Comorian People. He was an opponent of Ahmed Abdallah, the first President of the Comoros. He was also a member of Parti Blanc.

He served as Minister of Foreign Affairs from 1976 to 1978 under the Presidency of Ali Soilih. Abdallah was defeated in the 1993 Comorian legislative election and did not make it past the first round in the 1996 Comorian presidential election. He was President of the Comorian Constitutional Court from 2007 to 2008.

Abdallah died in 2020 from COVID-19.
