= List of current Comorian islands presidents =

This is a list of the three current Comorian islands presidents.

== Presidents of the islands ==
Island	Name	Since
Ngazidja (Grande Comore)	Mohamed Abdoulwahab	30 Jun 2007
Ndzuwani (Anjouan)	Moussa Toybou	Jul 2008
Mwali (Mohéli)	Mohamed Ali Said	1 Jul 2007
