= 1972 Comorian cantonal election =

| ← 1970 | 3 December 1972 | 1978 → |
- All 39 seats in the Chamber of Deputies; 20 seats needed for a majority
| Party | Leader | Vote % | Seats |
|---|---|---|---|
| RDPC–UDC | | 76.24 | 34 |
| Mahoré People's Movement | | 9.10 | 5 |
This lists parties that won seats. See the complete results below.

Parliamentary elections were held in the Comoros on 3 December 1972. The result was a victory for the Democratic Rally of the Comorian People–Comorian Democratic Union alliance, which received over 75% of the vote and won 34 of the 39 seats in the Chamber of Deputies. Turnout was 81%.

== Results ==
| Party | Votes | % | Seats |
|---|---|---|---|
| RDPC–UDC | 79,946 | 76.24 | 34 |
| Umma Party | 13,021 | 12.42 | 0 |
| Mahoré People's Movement | 9,543 | 9.10 | 5 |
| Socialist Party of Comoros | 2,352 | 2.24 | 0 |
| Total | 104,862 | 100.00 | 39 |
| Valid votes | 104,862 | 99.75 | |
| Invalid/blank votes | 267 | 0.25 | |
| Total votes | 105,129 | 100.00 | |
| Registered voters/turnout | 129,069 | 81.45 | |
Source: Nohlen et al.
