= Dhoihir Dhoulkamal =

Comorian politician

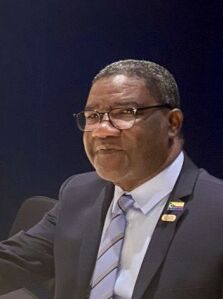

Minister of Foreign Affairs
- In office 28 September 2020 – 9 July 2024
- President: Azali Assoumani
- Preceded by: Mohamed El-Amine Souef
- Succeeded by: Mbae Mohamed

Personal details
- Born: August 6, 1969 (age 56) Anjouan, Comoros
- Occupation: Politician

Dhoihir Dhoulkamal (born August 6, 1969) is a Comorian politician from Anjouan. He has served as the minister of foreign affairs from 28 September 2020 until 9 July 2024 in Comoros. In March 2025, the justice system of La Réunion issued an international search warrant for him. He is suspected of misappropriation of French social assistance for about 251 thousands Euros.
