= 1956 French legislative election in the Comoros =

Elections to the French National Assembly were held in the Comoros on 17 June 1951. The territory elected a single seat, won by Saïd Mohamed Cheikh.

== Results ==
Candidate	Votes	%
Saïd Mohamed Cheikh	21,748	50.95
Saïd Ibrahim	20,940	49.05
Total	42,688	100.00
Valid votes	42,688	99.15
Invalid/blank votes	367	0.85
Total votes	43,055	100.00
Registered voters/turnout	53,558	80.39
Source: Sternberger et al.
