= 1951 French legislative election in the Comoros =

Elections to the French National Assembly were held in the Comoros on 17 June 1951. The territory elected a single seat, won by Saïd Mohamed Cheikh.

== Results ==
Candidate	Votes	%
Saïd Mohamed Cheikh	17,265	78.09
Mohamed Ahmed	4,665	21.10
Mohamed Larif Saïd Mansaïb	180	0.81
Total	22,110	100.00
Valid votes	22,110	98.62
Invalid/blank votes	310	1.38
Total votes	22,420	100.00
Registered voters/turnout	40,491	55.37
Source: Sternberger et al.
