= Ahmed Ben Said Jaffar =

Comorian politician (born 1966)

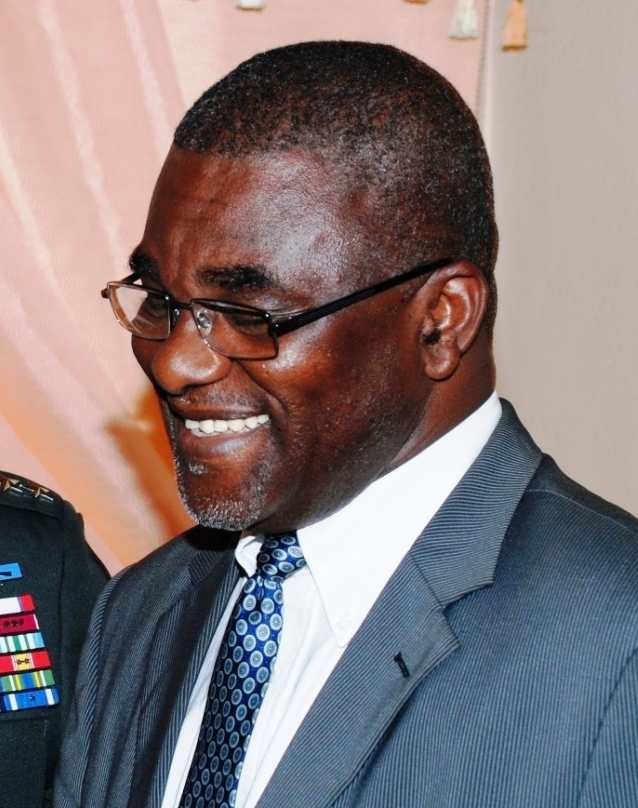
Ahmed Jaffar

Ahmed Ben Said Jaffar (born 1966) is a Comorian politician. He was the foreign minister of the country 28 May 2006 to 2010, when he was replaced by Fahmi Said Ibrahim El Maceli.
