= June 1946 French legislative election in the Comoros =

Elections to the French National Assembly were held in the Comoros on 2 June 1946. The territory elected a single seat, won unopposed by Saïd Mohamed Cheikh.

== Results ==
Candidate	Votes	%
Saïd Mohamed Cheikh	3,685	100.00
Total	3,685	100.00
Valid votes	3,685	99.38
Invalid/blank votes	23	0.62
Total votes	3,708	100.00
Registered voters/turnout	4,818	76.96
Source: Sternberger et al.
