= Rally for Change and Democracy =

Political party in the Comoros

The Rally for Change and Democracy (French: Rassemblement pour le Changement et la Démocratie, RACHADE) was a political party in the Comoros led by Said Hassane Said Hachim.

== History ==
Formed in 1991, RACHADE received 8.1% of the vote in the 1992 parliamentary elections, finishing in third place. The party won a single seat in the early elections the following year.

Following a 1995 coup RACHADE joined the government formed by interim President Caabi El-Yachroutu Mohamed, with Soilih Hassan becoming Minister of Justice and Islamic Affairs and Chaharane Said Ali becoming Minister of Public Services. Hachim was the party's candidate for the 1996 presidential elections, finishing ninth in a field of 15 candidates.
