= Union of Democrats for Development =

Political party in the Comoros

The Union of Democrats for Development (French: Union des Démocrates pour le Développment, UDD) was a political party in the Comoros led by Ibrahim Halidi. Based on Anjouan, it was supportive of the government of President Said Mohamed Djohar.

== History ==
The party was established in December 1991 by Ibrahim Halidi, Saïd Mohamed Djohar and Mohamed Dhakoine Abdou. The party's emblem was a black umbrella.

In the 1992 parliamentary elections the UDD finished second in the popular vote, but emerged as the largest party in the Assembly of the Union, winning seven of the 42 seats. Following the elections Halidi was appointed prime minister.

Prior to the early parliamentary elections in 1993 the UDD formed an alliance with the newly established Rally for Democracy and Renewal (RDR) created by Djohar. The RDR won 28 of the 42 seats in the Assembly.
