= Democratic Rally of the Comorian People =

Political party in the Comoros

The Democratic Rally of the Comorian People (French: Rassemblement Démocratique des Peuples Comoriens, RDPC) was a political party in the Comoros. It is also the founding and ruling party of the State of the Comoros from 1975 to 1978.

== History ==
The party was established in 1968, and was based mainly in Grande Comore. It became known as the "White Party", as it used white ballots during elections.

In the 1970 by-election to the French National Assembly, the RDPC candidate Ali Mroudjaé was defeated by Mohamed Dahalani of the List for the Fifth Republic by a margin of 53–47%. In the cantonal elections in 1972, the RDPC formed an alliance with the Comorian Democratic Union, winning 34 of the 39 seats.
