= Minister of Foreign Affairs (Comoros) =

This is a list of foreign ministers of the Comoros.

- 1975............ Ahmed Abdallah
- 1975–1976: Said Mohamed Jaffar
- 1976............ Ali Soilih
- 1976–1978: Abdallah Mouzaoir
- 1978–1982: Ali Mroudjaé
- 1982–1990: Said Kafe
- 1990–1991: Mtara Maécha
- 1991–1993: Said Hassane Said Hachim
- 1993............ Athoumane Said Ahmed
- 1993–1994: Mouslim Ben Moussa
- 1994–1995: Said Mohamed Sagaf
- 1995............ Mohamed Abdoulwahab
- 1995–1996: Abdallah Mouzaoir
- 1996–1997: Said Omar Said Ahmed
- 1997............ Mouhtar Ahmed Charif
- 1997–1998: Ibrahim Ali Mzimba
- 1998............ Salim Himidi
- 1998–1999: Nidhoim Attoumane
- 1999–2002: Mohamed El-Amine Souef
- 2002............ Halidi Charif
- 2002–2005: Mohamed El-Amine Souef
- 2005–2006: Aboudou Soefou
- 2006–2010: Ahmed Ben Said Jaffar
- 2010–2011: Fahmi Said Ibrahim
- 2011–2013: Mohamed Bakri Ben Abdoulfatah Charif
- 2013–2015: El-Anrif Said Hassane
- 2015–2016: Abdoulkarim Mohamed
- 2016–2017: Mohamed Bacar Dossar
- 2017–2020: Mohamed El-Amine Souef
- 2020–2024: Dhoihir Dhoulkamal
- 2024–present: Mohamed Mbaé Chanfiou

== Sources ==
- Rulers.org – Foreign ministers A–D
