= 1989 Comorian constitutional referendum =

- 5 November 1989
- Referendum on allowing Ahmed Abdallah to run for a third term and creating the position of PM

Results
Choice	Votes	%
Yes	240,281	92.49%
No	19,500	7.51%
Valid votes	259,781	100.00%
Invalid or blank votes	0	0.00%
Total votes	259,781	100.00%
Registered voters/turnout	265,222	97.95%

A constitutional referendum was held in the Comoros on 5 November 1989. The proposed amendments to the constitution would allow incumbent President Ahmed Abdallah to run for a third term while establishing the office of Prime Minister.

The official result was a 92.5 percent majority in favor of the amendments proposed by Abdallah. This created "the conditions for a life presidency," warned one opposition leader. Voting was marked by manipulation by the government. Opposition groups reported that polling places lacked private voting booths, government officials blocked the entry of opposition poll watchers, and the army and police removed ballot boxes before voting ended. Reaction to these abuses was unusually angry. In Njazidja voters smashed ballot boxes rather than have them carted away by the army; the governor's office in Nzwani was set on fire, and a bomb was found outside the home of the minister of finance in Moroni. More than 100 people were arrested following the referendum, and in subsequent weeks the international media described a deteriorating situation in the islands; Abdallah claimed that France "authorizes terrorism in the Comoros," and leaders of the banned opposition questioned the legitimacy of the referendum in public statements.

On 26 November Abdallah was killed during a coup led by Said Mohamed Djohar.

== Results ==
Choice	Votes	%
For	240,281	92.5
Against	19,500	7.5
Invalid/blank votes		–
Total	259,781	100
Registered voters/turnout	265,222	97.95
Source: African Elections Database
