= Vêlayoudom Marimoutou =

French economist

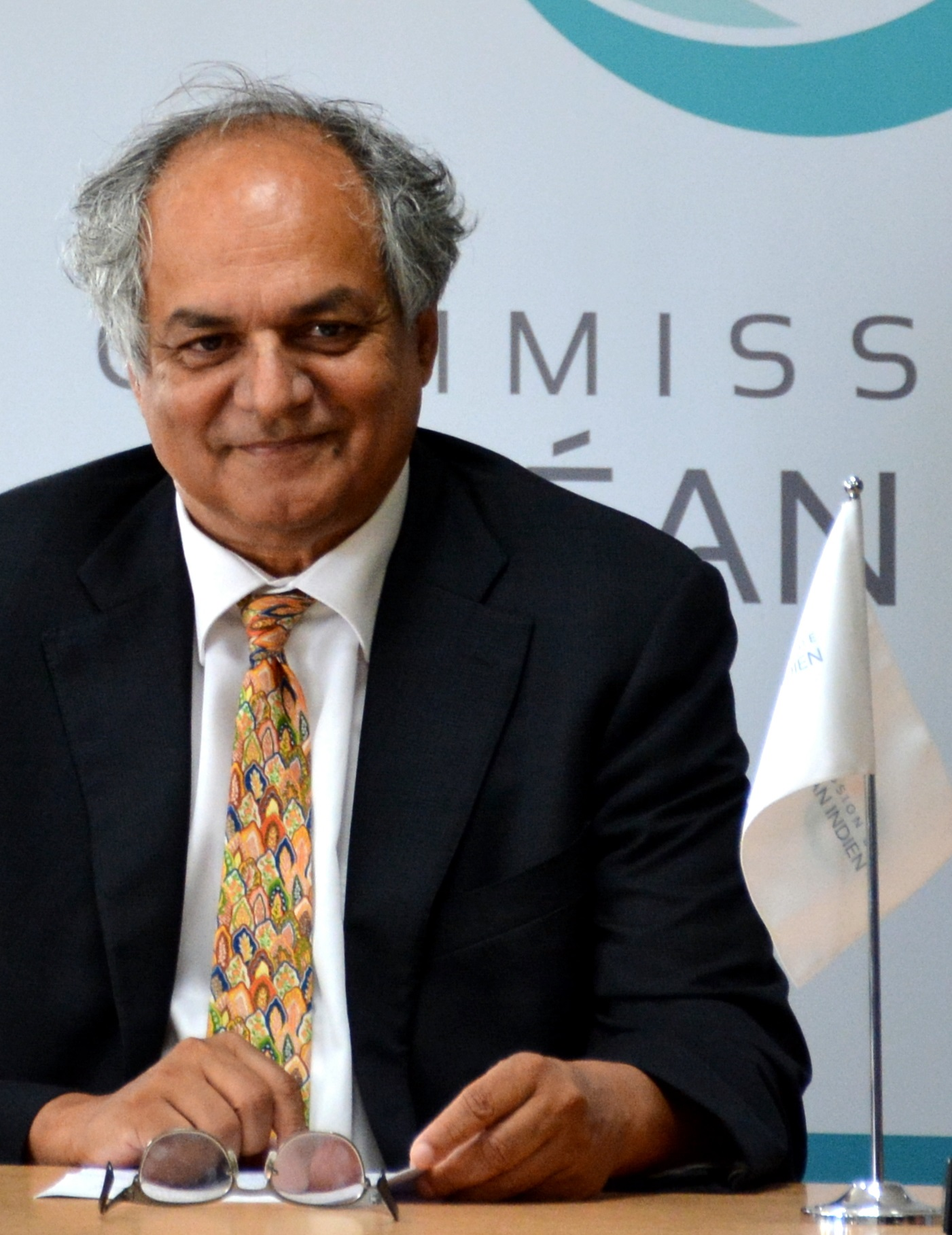
- Vêlayoudom Marimoutou in 2020

Secretary General of the Indian Ocean Commission
- In office 16 July 2020 – 16 July 2024
- Preceded by: Hamadi Madi Bolero
- Succeeded by: Edgard Razafindravahy

Rector of the Academy of Réunion
- In office 2016–2020
- Succeeded by: Chantal Manès-Bonnisseau

Personal details
- Born: 12 December 1957 (age 68)

Vêlayoudom Marimoutou (born 12 December 1957) is a French economist who served as Secretary General of the Indian Ocean Commission between 2020 and 2024.

== Honours ==
- Knight (2011)
- Commander in the Order of Academic Palms (2016)
- Knight of the Legion of Honour (2018).
