= Indian Ocean Commission =

Intergovernmental organisation

- Commission de l'Océan Indien
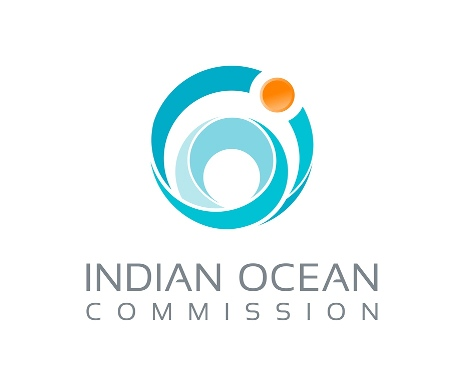

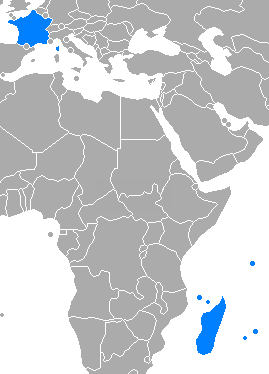
- Map of members (including mainland France)
- Abbreviation: IOC
- Formation: 1982
- Founded at: Port Louis, Mauritius
- Type: Intergovernmental organisation
- Headquarters: Ebene, Mauritius
- Members: 5 member states: Comoros; Madagascar; Mauritius; Réunion (Note: Indian Ocean overseas region of France.); Seychelles; 8 observers: China; India; Japan; South Korea; European Union; La Francophonie; Order of Malta; United Nations
- Official language: French
- Secretary General: Edgard Razafindravahy
- Website: commissionoceanindien.org

The Indian Ocean Commission (French: Commission de l'Océan Indien, COI) is an intergovernmental organisation that links five African Indian Ocean nations — i.e. Comoros, Madagascar, Mauritius, Réunion (France), and Seychelles. There are also eight observers as of August 2025: China, the European Union, La Francophonie, the Order of Malta, India, Japan, the United Nations and South Korea.

The IOC was created in 1982 in Port-Louis, Mauritius, and institutionalised in 1984 by the Victoria Agreement (Seychelles). The organisation coordinates cooperative efforts amongst its member and observer nations which primarily focus on environmental management and preservation. Some of the more specific areas of focus in its past projects include maritime concerns and fisheries, the needs of growing island states, adapting to climate change outcomes, food security and public health.

== History ==
The IOC was created in 1982 in Port Louis, by the Ministers of Foreign Affairs of Mauritius, Madagascar and Seychelles.

In 1984, the General Cooperation Agreement signed in Victoria (Seychelles) institutionalised the organization.

In 1986 — Comoros and Réunion (France), joined the organisation.

In 1989, the IOC was provided with a General Secretariat. The headquarters of the IOC is located in Mauritius.

=== Development ===
Since the early 1990s, the IOC has been implementing cooperation projects in environmental management and preservation with the support of the European Union and French cooperation. Over the course of these projects, the IOC has acquired recognised expertise in the management of marine and coastal environments, fisheries and the preservation of biodiversity.

At the beginning of the 2000s, the IOC constantly advocated the specific needs of developing islands, particularly in conferences organised by the United Nations.

In September 2005, the IOC requested observer status at the UN General Assembly.

In 2016, China became the first observer member of the organisation. It is later followed in 2017 by La Francophonie, the Order of Malta, and the European Union.

In 2018, the IOC assumes the chairmanship of the Contact Group on Piracy off the Coast of Somalia (CGPCS) for a period of two years. In 2020, Kenya takes over the chairmanship. However, the IOC continues to serve as the secretariat of the CGPCS.

In 2019, at a ministerial retreat in Moroni (Comoros), the Moroni Declaration on the Future of the IOC is adopted. This text deals with the modernisation of the IOC.

During the 34th Council of Ministers of 6 March 2020 in Seychelles, the founding text of the IOC — namely the Victoria Agreement, is revised.

In 2020 — India, Japan, and the United Nations became observer members.

The IOC's project portfolio has expanded considerably i.e. political stability, public health, gender, mobility, entrepreneurship, infrastructure, regional connectivity (digital, air, maritime), trade negotiations, maritime security, food security and agricultural development, fisheries and fisheries surveillance, climate change mitigation, sustainable coastal zone management, waste management, use of earth observation technologies for environmental monitoring, renewable energy, culture, etc.

The IOC has a dozen technical and financial partners, among which the European Union and the French Development Agency.

In May 2023, Mauritius assumed the presidency of the Council of Ministers.

In April 2025, French President Emmanuel Macron called for the integration of Mayotte as a member of the IOC, advocating for a "pragmatic approach" with the Comoros.

On 17 April 2025, South Korea became the eighth observer member of the organisation.

== Members ==
=== Member states ===
States	Year
Comoros	1986
Réunion (France)	1986
Madagascar	1982
Mauritius	1982
Seychelles	1982

=== Observers ===
Members	Joined year
China	2016
Order of Malta	2017
La Francophonie	2017
European Union	2017
India	2020
Japan	2020
United Nations	2020
South Korea	2025

== Administration ==
=== Bodies ===
The Council of Ministers (composed of the foreign ministers of the member countries) provides the strategic and political direction of the IOC. It is the supreme decision-making body of the organisation. The chairmanship of the IOC Council of Ministers is annual and rotating (in alphabetical order of member countries).

The Committee of Permanent Liaison Officers (composed of senior officials from member states) is responsible for monitoring the implementation of these decisions.

The General Secretariat, based in Ebene, Mauritius, is responsible for implementing the decisions of the decision-making bodies. It develops and manages cooperation projects. It is responsible for mobilizing resources from the donor community.

The revised Victoria Agreement (2020) makes the Summit of Heads of State and Government a statutory body of the organisation. The IOC Summit will now be held every five years to set the strategic and political direction of the organisation.

=== Secretaries-general ===
Secretary-general	Image	Member state	Start of mandate	End of mandate
Henri Rasolondraibe		Madagascar	5 June 1989	5 July 1993
Jérémie Bonnelame		Seychelles	5 July 1993	5 July 1997
Caabi El-Yachroutu Mohamed		Comoros	5 July 1997	12 July 2001
Wilfrid Bertile		Réunion (France)	12 July 2001	5 July 2004
Monique Andréas Esoavelomandroso		Madagascar	5 July 2004	15 July 2008
Callixte d'Offay		Seychelles	15 July 2008	12 July 2012
Jean Claude de l'Estrac		Mauritius	12 July 2012	13 July 2016
Hamadi Madi Boléro		Comoros	13 July 2016	16 July 2020
Vêlayoudom Marimoutou		Réunion (France)	16 July 2020	15 July 2024
Edgard Razafindravahy		Madagascar	16 July 2024	—

== Objectives and areas of intervention ==
As an intergovernmental organisation of cooperation, the Indian Ocean Commission promotes peace and stability, maritime security, food security, environmental conservation, fisheries, climate change adaptation, the interests of island developing states, public health and cultural expression.

Its action is thus in line with the international frameworks to which its member states are signatories, such as the Global Agenda for Sustainable Development to 2030 and the Global Climate Agreement, among others.

In 2018 the IOC launched its Information Fusion Centre for the Indian Ocean region (IFC-IOR) in Madagascar, and the Seychelles Regional Centre for Operational Coordination (RCOC) to conduct joint operations as the executive arm of the Maritime Security Architecture (MSA) of the Western Indian Ocean. In September 2022, IFC-IOR and RCOC conducted their first joint operations with EUNAVFOR.

In 2020, the IOC is implementing 14 cooperation projects. Over the period 2020–2025, it will manage a total project budget of approximately 130 million euros.

== See also ==
- Indian Ocean Rim Association
