= Nourdine Midiladji =

Comorian politician

Nourdine Midiladji is a politician in the Comoros. He finished 5th in the 2006 Comorian presidential election with 9.65% in the first round of voting. He did not qualify for the run-off. He served as Minister of Solidarity under the former president Azali Assoumani from January 2003 until May 2006.
