= Mohamed El-Amine Souef =

Comorian diplomat

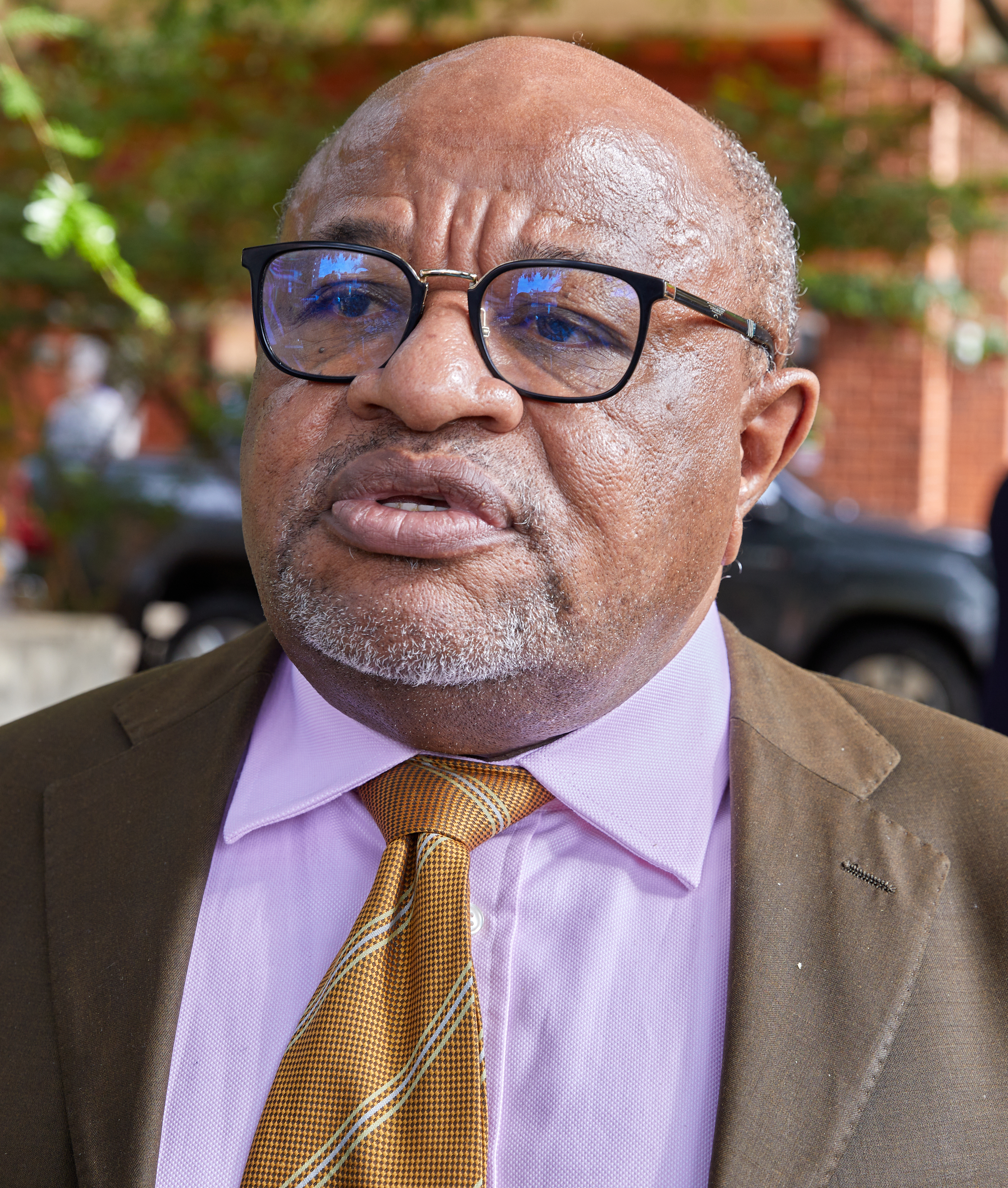
- Mohamed El-Amine Souef in 2022

African Union Special Envoy for Somalia
- Incumbent
- Assumed office 1 September 2022
- Preceded by: Francisco Madeira

Personal details
- Born: July 28, 1962 (age 63)
- Occupation: Diplomat

Mohamed El-Amine Souef (born July 28, 1962) is a Comorian diplomat who has been serving as United Nations Secretary-General António Guterres's Special Representative for Central Africa and Head of the United Nations Regional Office for Central Africa (UNOCA) since 2026.

Over the course of his career, Souef served as his country's foreign minister, ambassador to Egypt, and Permanent Representative to the Arab League (1995–1998).

== Early life and education ==
Souef holds a post-graduate diploma of Advanced Studies in Modern Literature from Sidi Mohamed Ben Abdellah University in Fez, Morocco, and a bachelor’s degree in Language and Literature from the Islamic University of Madinah in Saudi Arabia. He also attended diplomatic training at the Institute for Diplomatic Studies of Egypt in 1991 and the Foreign Service Academy of Islamabad, Pakistan from 1991 to 1992.

== Career ==
=== Career in national government ===
Souef was appointed deputy Foreign Minister in charge of the Arab World by president Mohamed Taki Abdulkarim in 1998. He first became foreign minister in 1999, following the military coup of Azali Assoumani. He resigned briefly in January 2002, along with Azali Assoumani, to make way for a transitional government, but he was reappointed a few months later when Assoumani won elections and regained power. He lost his post again in July 2005 during a cabinet reshuffle. After the reshuffle, Souef was named Ambassador and Permanent Representative of the Comoros to the United Nations in New York (April 2006). Previously, in government, He served as Parliamentarian, Minister of Foreign Affairs and Cooperation, State Minister in charge of Cooperation, Ambassador to Egypt and Permanent Representative to the Arab League States and, Adviser to the President of the Comoros.

=== Career with the United Nations ===
Souef served as head of the United Nations Multidimensional Integrated Stabilization Mission in Mali (MINUSMA), based in Gao/Mali from 2015 to 2017 and again in 2020 and 2022. He held the same title in the United Nations–African Union Mission in Darfur (UNAMID) Khartoum liaison office (KLO) and UNAMID Office in south and North Darfur from 2011 to 2015.

=== Career with the African Union ===
In 2022, Souef was appointed as the Special Envoy of the African Union (AU) for Somalia and head the AU's Transition Mission in Somalia (ATMIS), replacing Mozambican diplomat Francisco Madeira. In 2025, he worked at the African Union Commission as Chief of Staff.

Souef is a scholar and an author of five books on politics and geopolitics .

- Les Comores en mouvement (2008)
- Les grands défis de la politique étrangère des Comores (2009)
- Le Transport aérien aux Comores entre Souveraineté et Sécurité, Ed de lalune (2009)
- Discours et Images des Comores, Ed de lalune
- Réflexions sur géopolitique de l’Océan indien, Ed de laLune

== See also ==
- Mahmoud Ali Youssouf
