= Governor of Grande Comore =

The Governor of Grande Comore is the head of the autonomous government of Grande Comore (Ngazidja), the largest island of the Comoros. The position was established in 2002 following the adoption of the Comorian Constitution of 2001. The president has executive powers as well as three vice presidents. The president and the vice presidents hold five-year terms. Each vice president represents an island of the Comoros.

== History ==
Abdou Soulé Elbak, elected in two rounds (12 and 19 May 2002) as an opponent of then-President of the Union Azali Assoumani, served as the island's first president. He took office on 29 May 2002. Elbak attempted to win a second term in office in June 2007, but was defeated in the first round. Mohamed Abdoulwahab, a lawyer and politician, emerged as the winner and took office on 30 June 2007.

In 2009 a referendum passed that reduced the government's size, and replaced the islands' presidents with governors, and extended a presidential term from four to five years. A later referendum replaced the governors with vice presidents in 2018.

== Presidents of Grande Comore (2002-2009) ==
- Abdou Soulé Elbak (29 May 2002 - 26 May 2007)
- Soulé Ahamada Mroivili (26 May 2007 - 30 May 2007) (substitute)
- Soudjay Hamadi (30 May 2007 - 30 June 2007) (interim)
- Mohamed Abdoulwahab (30 June 2007 – 2009)

== Governors of Grande Comore (since 2009) ==
- Mohamed Abdoulwahab (2009–2011)
- Mouigni Baraka Saïd Soilihi (2011–2016)
- Hassani Hamadi (2016–2019)
- Mhoudine Sitti Farouata (2019–2024)
- Ibrahim Mze Mohamed (Since 2024)
