= 2002 Comorian presidential election =

Election of Azali Assoumani

- 17 March 2002 (primary); 14 April 2002 (national)
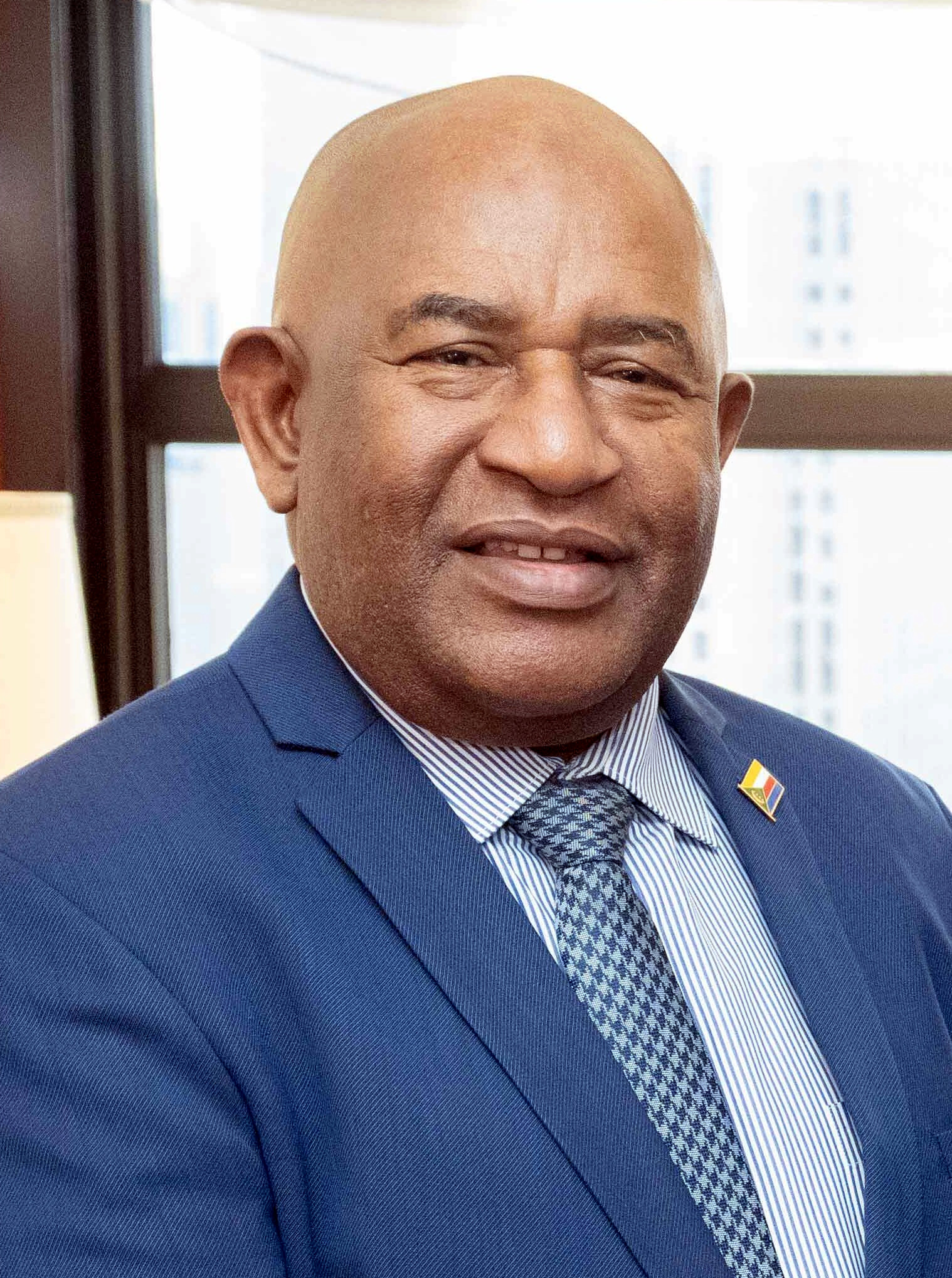
| Nominee | Azali Assoumani |
| Party | Independent |
| Popular vote | 81,551 |
| Percentage | 100% |
President before election
Azali Assoumani
Elected President
Azali Assoumani

Presidential elections were held in the Comoros in 2002. In accordance with the new constitution approved in a referendum the previous year, the island of Grande Comore was to provide the candidates for this election as part of a rotation agreement between the three islands. A first round was held on Grande Comore on 17 March, after which the top three candidates, Azali Assoumani, Mahamoud Mradabi and Saïd Ali Kemal went through to a second, national round of voting on 14 April. However, both Mradabi and Kemal boycotted the second round, leaving Assoumani as the only candidate.

== Results ==
| Candidate | Party | Grande Comore primary | | National vote | |
| Candidate | Party | Votes | % | Votes | % |
|---|---|---|---|---|---|
| Azali Assoumani | Independent | 44,298 | 39.81 | 81,551 | 100.00 |
| Mahamoud Mradabi | Shawiri | 17,462 | 15.69 | | |
| Saïd Ali Kemal | Islands' Fraternity and Unity Party | 11,881 | 10.68 | | |
| Abbas Djoussouf | Movement for Democracy and Progress | 8,761 | 7.87 | | |
| Mtara Maécha | National Rally for Development–Renewal | 8,748 | 7.86 | | |
| Youssouf Saïd | Djawabu | 6,752 | 6.07 | | |
| Abdallah Halifa | Hope 2000 | 4,998 | 4.49 | | |
| Ali Mroudjaé | Comorian Party for Democracy and Progress | 4,624 | 4.16 | | |
| Mustapha Saïd Cheikh | Democratic Front of the Comoros | 3,759 | 3.38 | | |
| Total | | 111,283 | 100.00 | 81,551 | 100.00 |
| Valid votes | | 111,283 | 96.70 | 81,551 | 93.47 |
| Invalid/blank votes | | 3,795 | 3.30 | 5,700 | 6.53 |
| Total votes | | 115,078 | 100.00 | 87,251 | 100.00 |
| Registered voters/turnout | | 150,867 | 76.28 | 223,396 | 39.06 |
Source: African Elections Database
