= Dialogue Proposition Action =

Dialogue Proposition Action (DPA-Mwangaza) was a political party in the Comoros led by Mohamed Saïd Abdallah Mchangama.

== History ==
The party received 5.4% of the vote in the 1992 parliamentary elections, winning seats in the Assembly of the Union.

In October 1993 it merged into the Rally for Democracy and Renewal, which went on to win the parliamentary elections in December.
