= Comorian Party for Democracy and Progress =

Political party in the Comoros

The Comorian Party for Democracy and Progress (French: Parti Comrorien pour la Démocratie et le Progrès, PCDP) was a political party in the Comoros.

== History ==
Led by Ali Mroudjaé, the PCDP went into opposition in November 1991. The party won three seats in the 1992 parliamentary elections. However, it was reduced to a single seat in the early elections the following year.

Mroudjaé was the party's candidate for the 2002 presidential elections, finishing eighth out of nine candidates with 4% of the vote. Prior to the 2004 parliamentary elections the RND joined the Camp of the Autonomous Islands alliance, which was opposed to Azali. The alliance won 12 of the 18 elected seats and all 15 of the indirectly-elected seats.

The party nominated Loutfi Soulaimane as its candidate for the 2006 presidential elections. He received only 2% of the vote, finishing eleventh in a field of 13 candidates.
