= Said Hassane Said Hachim =

Comorian politician (1932–2020)

Said Hassane Said Hachim (11 November 1932 – 30 November 2020) was a Comorian politician. He was Foreign Minister from 1991 until 1993. He replaced Mtara Maecha. In 1996, he contested the presidential elections, eventually losing to Mohamed Taki Abdoulkarim. He died on 30 November 2020 at the age of 88 years and 19 days
