= Mohamed Mbaé Chanfiou =

Comoros politician

Minister of Foreign Affairs
- Incumbent
- Assumed office 9 July 2024
- Preceded by: Dhoihir Dhoulkamal

Personal details
- Party: Independent

Mohamed Mbaé Chanfiou is a Comoros politician who has been Minister of Foreign Affairs since 2024. He was elected in the 2025 Comorian parliamentary election.
