= 1945 French legislative election in the Comoros =

Elections to the French National Assembly were held in the Comoros on 21 October 1945. The territory elected a single seat, won by Saïd Mohamed Cheikh.

== Results ==
Candidate	Votes	%
Saïd Mohamed Cheikh	3,086	92.34
Other candidates	256	7.66
Total	3,342	100.00
Valid votes	3,342	98.18
Invalid/blank votes	62	1.82
Total votes	3,404	100.00
Registered voters/turnout	4,447	76.55
Source: Sternberger et al.
