= Monique Andréas Esoavelomandroso =

Malagasy politician (1945–2025)

Ombudsman for the Republic of Madagascar

Secretary of State for Decentralisation and Development of Autonomous Provinces
- In office 2002–2004
- President: Marc Ravalomanana

General Secretary of the Indian Ocean Commission
- In office 2004–2008

Personal details
- Born: August 18, 1945 Fort-Dauphin, Madagascar
- Died: March 17, 2025 (aged 79) Madagascar
- Spouse: Manassé Esoavelomandroso
- Occupation: Politician; financial auditor

Monique Andréas Esoavelomandroso (18 August 1945 – 17 March 2025) was a Malagasy politician.

== Life and career ==
Esoavelomandroso was born in Fort-Dauphin (now Tôlanaro) in the far south-east of Madagascar and was raised in the west coast city of Tuléar (now Toliara), receiving a religious education in the Lutheran Church. She qualified as a financial auditor after studying in Paris and at the University of Pittsburgh, and has written studies on the demographics of Madagascar. She was married to Manassé Esoavelomandroso, the leader of the Leader Fanilo party.

She served continuously as a minister in the Malagasy governments between 1971 and 2004. Her posts included the ministries of rural animation, finance and economics, population (including managing women's and children's affairs between 1977 and 1993) and budget and decentralisation. President Marc Ravalomanana appointed her as his secretary of state for decentralisation and development of autonomous provinces in 2002. In 2004, she was appointed the general secretary of the Indian Ocean Commission, in which role she served until 2008.

Esoavelomandroso was subsequently appointed for a six-year term as Ombudsman for the Republic of Madagascar, with responsibility for representing the interests of Malagasy citizens by investigating and addressing complaints of maladministration or violations of rights. Her appointment was not without controversy, as her marriage to a leading opposition politician prompted concerns about her ability to perform as a neutral mediator.

She also served as the President of the "Avoty ny Ankizy" (Save the Children) organisation and the Association of Women Treasury Inspectors.

Esoavelomandroso was distinguished with the Grand Croix, 2nd class of the Malagasy Legion of Honor on 12 April 2021.

Esoavelomandroso died on 17 March 2025, at the age of 79.
