= Party for National Salvation =

- Ideology: Islamism; Islamic democracy

The Party for National Salvation (French: Parti pour le Salut National, PSN) was an Islamic political party in the Comoros.

== History ==
The PSN was supportive of President Said Mohamed Djohar. It received 2.3% of the vote in the 1992 parliamentary elections, gaining representation in the Assembly of the Union.

In 2006 the party began to cooperate with the Rally for Development and Democracy (RDD) as the PSN/RDD, eventually merging into a single party, the Party for National Salvation, Rally, Democracy and Development (PSNRDD).
