= Twamaya =

Comoros political party

Twamaya was a political party in the Comoros.

== History ==
Based in Anjouan, the party received 0.8% of the vote in the 1992 parliamentary elections. After the results in some constituencies were annulled, the party won a seat in the Assembly of the Union in the subsequent by-elections held in December.
