= Abdou Soulé Elbak =

Comorian politician

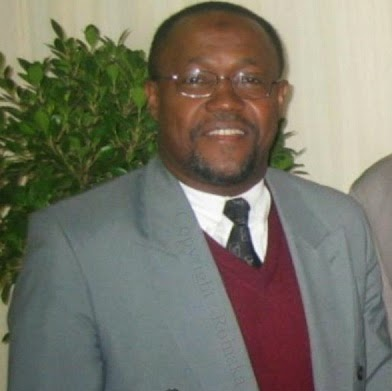

President of Grande Comore
- In office 2002–2007
- Preceded by: Position established
- Succeeded by: Soulé Ahamada Mroivili

Personal details
- Born: 1954

Mzé Abdou Soulé Elbak (/ˈɑːbduː ˈsuːleɪ ɛlˈbæk/ AHB-doo SOO-lay el-BAK; born 1954) was president of the autonomous island of Grande Comore in the Comoros from 2002 to 2007.
