= Fahmi Said Ibrahim =

Comorian politician and lawyer

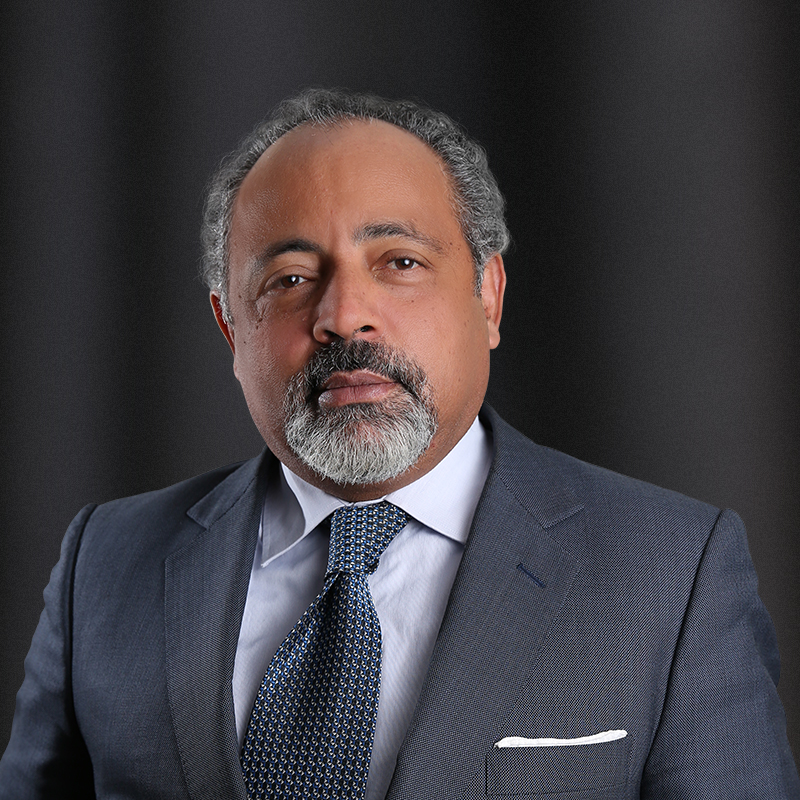
Fahmi Said Ibrahim

Prince Fahmi Said Ibrahim El Maceli is a Comorian and French lawyer and politician. He is the son of Said Ibrahim of Grand Comore, former president of Comoros Island. Prince Fahmi Said Ibrahim was the foreign minister of the Comoros from 2010 to 2011.
