= Comorian Popular Front =

Political party in the Comoros

The Comorian Popular Front (French: Front Popular Comorien, FPC) was a political party in the Comoros.

== History ==
The FPC nominated Mohamed Hassanali as its candidate for the 1990 presidential elections. He finished seventh out of eight candidates with 4.6% of the vote. The party received 2.4% of the vote in the 1992 elections, winning two seats. Both seats were retained in the early elections the following year.
