= 1996 Comorian constitutional referendum =

A constitutional referendum was held in the Comoros on 20 October 1996. The proposed amendments would set the presidential term at 6 years, create a unicameral parliament, and limit the authority of the individual islands' parliaments. The proposals were approved by 85% of voters, with a turnout of around 64%.

== Results ==
Choice	Votes	%
For		85
Against		15
Invalid/blank votes		–
Total		100
Registered voters/turnout		64
Source: African Elections Database
