= 1978 Comorian parliamentary election =

Parliamentary elections were held in the Comoros on 8 and 15 December 1978, following the adoption of a new constitution in a referendum in October. All candidates ran as independents. Following the elections, Salim Ben Ali was appointed Prime Minister on 22 December, and a government was formed on 28 December.

== Electoral system ==
The election was held using the two-round system in 38 single-member constituencies; 18 on Grande Comore, 15 on Anjouan and 5 on Mohéli, each of which elected a single member.

== Results ==
Of the 38 members elected, 35 were civil servants, two were farmers and one was a tradesman.

Party	First round		Second round		Seats
Party	Votes	%	Votes	%	Seats
Independents	143,548	100.00	55,806	100.00	38
Total	143,548	100.00	55,806	100.00	38
Valid votes	143,548	99.16	55,806	99.35	
Invalid/blank votes	1,219	0.84	366	0.65	
Total votes	144,767	100.00	56,172	100.00	
Registered voters/turnout	191,468	75.61	71,849	78.18	
Source: IPU
