= Hamada Madi =

Former Prime Minister of the Comoros [2000-2002] and interim president

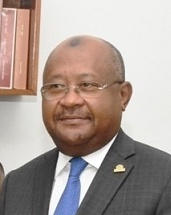
- Madi in 2018

Secretary General of the Indian Ocean Commission
- In office 13 July 2016 – 16 July 2020
- Succeeded by: Vêlayoudom Marimoutou

President of the Comoros
- In office 21 January 2002 – 26 May 2002
- Preceded by: Azali Assoumani
- Succeeded by: Azali Assoumani

Prime Minister of the Comoros
- In office 29 November 2000 – 15 April 2002
- Preceded by: Bianrifi Tarmidi
- Succeeded by: Position abolished

Personal details
- Born: 1965 (age 60–61) Mohéli, Comoros

Hamada Madi, widely known as "Boléro", is a Comorian politician, former Prime Minister and interim President. He was Secretary General of the Indian Ocean Commission between 2016 and 2020.

== Biography ==
Born on the island of Mohéli in 1965, he gained a degree in constitutional law in Ukraine and worked as a political adviser in Comoros, becoming secretary general of the Comoros Republican Party.

Before being appointed Prime Minister on 29 November 2000, he served as Secretary General for Defense in the Presidency and played a leading role in peace negotiations with Anjouan, leading to the Fomboni Accords. In January 2002, it was agreed, despite some opposition, that he would replace Colonel Azali Assoumani as interim head of state and oversee the Transitional Government of National Unity in the run-up to the legislative and presidential elections. Due to his Mohélian origins, he was ineligible to run for the union presidency in 2002, when the first four-year term was reserved for a Grande Comorian. After the return of Azali to the presidency in May 2002, Hamada Madi was kept on as special advisor without portfolio with Union cabinet status.

After waiting several months Bolero got the permission from the Presidency in April 2007 to leave the country.

In 2016 Modi became Secretary General of the Indian Ocean Commission. He was succeeded on 16 July 2020 by Vêlayoudom Marimoutou.

Political offices
Preceded by Bianrifi Tarmidi	Prime Minister of the Comoros; 2000–2002	Succeeded by Post abolished
Preceded by Azali Assoumani	President of the Comoros; 2002	Succeeded by Azali Assoumani
