= National Front for Justice =

Political party in the Comoros

- Ideology: Islamism; Islamic democracy
- Religion: Islam

The National Front for Justice (French: Front National pour la Justice, FNJ) is an Islamic political party in the Comoros.

== History ==
The FNJ was established by Ahmed Abdallah Mohamed Sambi, after he returned home from studying abroad. It was one of the few opposition parties to run in the 1996 parliamentary elections, winning three of the 43 seats in the Assembly of the Union, with Sambi included amongst its MPs.

The party joined the government following the 1999 coup, but left in October 2001 after the government approved the removal of the word "Islamic" from the country's official name in the new constitution being drawn up.

In 2006 Sambi contested the presidential elections as an independent, winning with 58% of the vote.
