= Movement for Renewal and Democratic Action =

Political party in the Comoros

The Movement for Renewal and Democratic Action (French: Mouvement pour la Renovation et l'Action Democratique, MOURAD) was a political party in the Comoros.

== History ==
The party was established in 1990. It received 3.1% of the vote in the 1992 parliamentary elections, winning one seat in the Assembly of the Union.
