= 1978 Anchorage mayoral election =

- October 3, 1978 (first round); October 24, 1978 (runoff)
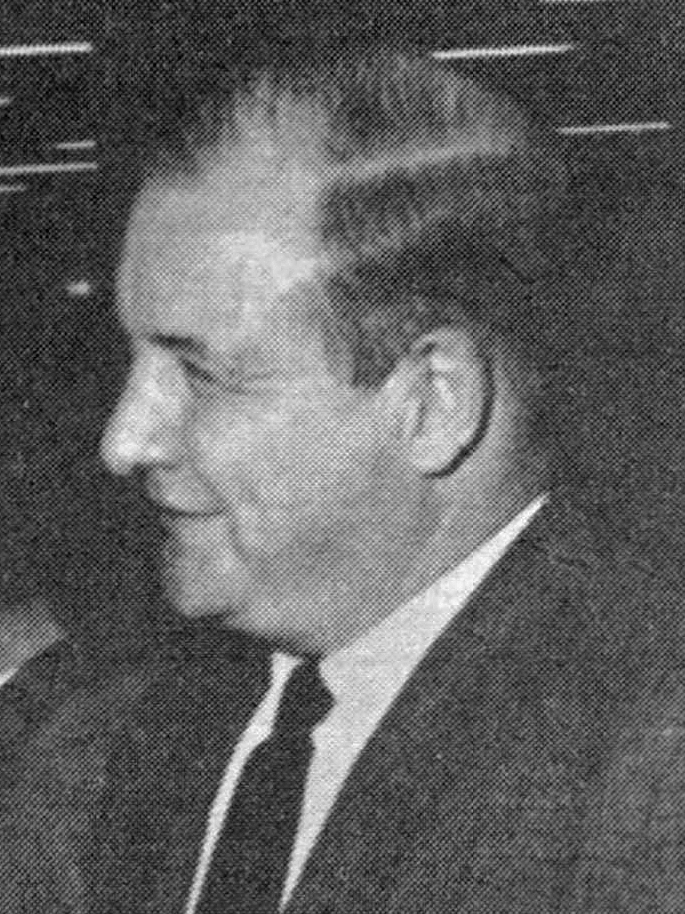

Candidate	George M. Sullivan	Dave Rose
First-round vote	11,156	10,083
First-round percentage	34.79%	31.44%
Second-round vote	16,458	13,306
Second-round percentage	55.30%	44.70%
Candidate	Dick Fischer	Harry Donahue
First-round vote	5,920	2,741
First-round percentage	18.46%	8.55%
Mayor before election
George M. Sullivan
Republican
Elected mayor
George M. Sullivan
Republican

The 1978 Anchorage mayoral election was held between October 3 and 24, 1978, in order to elect the mayor of Anchorage, Alaska. Incumbent Mayor George M. Sullivan was re-elected after a run-off against Dave Rose.

== General election ==
Since no candidate had received 40% of the vote in the first round (which at least one candidate was required to obtain to avoid a runoff), a runoff was held between the top-two finishers.

== Results ==
=== First round ===
Results
Party	Candidate	Votes	%
Nonpartisan	George M. Sullivan (incumbent)	11,156	34.79
Nonpartisan	Dave Rose	10,083	31.44
Nonpartisan	Dick Fischer	5,920	18.46
Nonpartisan	Harry Donahue	2,741	8.55
Nonpartisan	Bill Barnes	1,113	3.47
Nonpartisan	Jimmy Roush	697	2.17
Nonpartisan	George Bognar	357	1.11
Total votes		32,067	100.00

=== Runoff ===
Results
Party	Candidate	Votes	%
Nonpartisan	George M. Sullivan (incumbent)	16,458	55.30
Nonpartisan	Dave Rose	13,306	44.70
Total votes		29,764	100.00
