= Hassani Hamadi =

Comorian politician

Hassani Hamadi Mgomdri is a politician in Comoros.

Hamadi was born on 1 January 1961 in Grande Comore. He is an economist and diplomat by training. He was appointed advisor to the Prime Minister in charge of the economy and finance from 1994 to 1997. He was appointed Minister of Finance under Ahmed Abdallah Mohamed Sambi as of Sambi's inauguration on 28 May 2006. He held that position until 2007. He was appointed Minister of the Economy and Trade from 2007 to 2009.

Hamadi served as elected Governor of Grande Comore from May 2016 to 2019.
