= 1978 Werriwa by-election =

A by-election was held for the Australian House of Representatives seat of Werriwa on 23 September 1978. It was triggered by the resignation of Labor Party leader and former Prime Minister Gough Whitlam.

The by-election was won by Labor candidate John Kerin, who had previously served as the member for Macarthur during the Whitlam government, from 1972 to 1975.

== Results ==
1978 Werriwa by-election
| Party | Candidate | Votes | % | ±% |
|---|---|---|---|---|
| Labor | John Kerin | 40,272 | 67.2 | +11.7 |
| Liberal | William Sadler | 14,566 | 24.3 | −9.6 |
| Democrats | Keith Olson | 3,774 | 6.3 | −2.7 |
| Socialist Workers | John Garcia | 1,081 | 1.8 | +1.8 |
| New Australian | Hans Penninger | 214 | 0.4 | +0.4 |
| Total formal votes | | 59,897 | 98.2 | |
| Informal votes | | 1,093 | 1.8 | |
| Turnout | | 60,990 | 81.7 | |
Two-party-preferred result
| Labor | John Kerin | | 72.3 | +12.1 |
| Liberal | William Sadler | | 27.7 | −12.1 |
| Labor hold | | Swing | +12.1 | |
