= 1978 Greenlandic alcohol referendum =

Greenlandic referendum on alcohol consumption

A two-part referendum on alcohol was held in Greenland on 20 June 1978. Voters were asked whether they approved of the banning or rationing of alcohol. The ban on alcohol was rejected by 55% of voters, whilst the rationing proposal was approved by 58% of voters.

== Results ==
| Question | For | | Against | | Invalid/ blank | Total votes | Registered voters | Turnout | Outcome |
| Question | Votes | % | Votes | % | Invalid/ blank | Total votes | Registered voters | Turnout | Outcome |
|---|---|---|---|---|---|---|---|---|---|
| Are you for a total ban on alcoholic drinks? (Note: Danish: Er du tilhænger af et totalt alkoholforbud?) | 5,620 | 44.90 | 6,898 | 55.10 | | 12,518 | | | Rejected |
| If there is not a total ban, would you consider rationing? (Note: Danish: Hvis der ikke indføres et totalt forbud, er du så tilhænger af rationering?) | 6,236 | 58.76 | 4,376 | 41.24 | | 10,612 | | | Approved |
Source: Direct Democracy, Direct Democracy

== Aftermath ==
Following the referendum, rationing was introduced in August 1979. Adults over the age of 18 were limited to 72 "points" per month. A 33cl (12 fl. oz.) bottle of beer was equivalent to one point. In addition, a ban on home brewing and importing malt and hops was implemented.

The points system led to points trading, with points being sold for up to 25 Danish krone whilst the price of a bottle of beer was just 5 krone. However, consumption dropped from 18.7 litres (approx. 4½ gallons) per person to 13.8 litres (approx. 3½ gallons) by 1980. Following the scrapping of the rationing system in 1982, consumption rose to 22 litres (around 5 gallons) per person.
