= Combo Ayouba =

Military leader of the Comoros in 1995

Coordinator of the Transitional Military Committee
- In office 29 September 1995 – 2 October 1995
- Preceded by: Said Mohamed Djohar
- Succeeded by: Mohamed Taki Abdoulkarim

Personal details
- Born: 1952 Anjouan, Comoros
- Died: June 13, 2010 (aged 57–58) Moroni, Comoros
- Party: Military

Combo Ayouba, also referred to as Ayouba Combo, (1952 – June 13, 2010) was a Comorian colonel and senior member of the Military of Comoros. He was one of the highest-ranking military officers in the Comoros at the time of his assassination in 2010.

== Biography ==
Ayouba was born on the island of Anjouan, which was a French colony at the time. He initially worked as a police officer. However, he was trained as a presidential guard by the French mercenary, Bob Denard, during the 1980s.

On September 28, 1995, Bob Denard led his fourth military coup against the Comoran government. The coup, which Denard called Operation Kaskari, ousted President Said Mohamed Djohar, who was imprisoned in the military barracks. Colonel Ayouba became the Coordinator of the Transitional Military Committee, or head of state of the Comoros from September 29 until October 2, 1995, when the French military ousted Denard, Ayouba and their allies during Operation Azalee.

Ayouba was shot and killed at his home in Moroni on June 13, 2010. He was one of the highest-ranking officers in the Comoros at the time, and one of the few remaining officers who had been trained by Bob Denard.

Ayouba's killing was condemned by the French Foreign Ministry, which issued a statement saying it "hopes that those responsible for this killing will be identified and be brought to justice." The Comoran government deployed security forces to important government buildings throughout the capital, Moroni, following Ayouba's death. Schools and stores were closed throughout the country following the assassination. A demonstration by youths from Anjouan demanding the prosecution of Ayouba's killing was dispersed outside the Treasury building and courthouse.

Ayouba and other key Comoran public figures, including General Salimou Amiri, President Ahmed Abdallah Mohamed Sambi's chief of staff, reportedly received letters containing death threats in the months prior to Ayouba's killing.
