= 1978 Egyptian protection of national unity and social peace referendum =

1978 Egyptian referendum

A referendum on "the protection of national unity and social peace" was held in Egypt on 21 May 1978. It was approved by 98.3% of voters.

== Results ==
Choice	Votes	%
For	9,202,553	98.30
Against	159,578	1.70
Invalid/blank votes	23,393	–
Total	9,385,524	100
Registered voters/turnout	10,973,223	85.83
Source: Direct Democracy
