= 1978 Shetland referendum =

- 16 March 1978
- In view of the proposals for devolution for Scotland, do you agree that the Shetland Islands Council should continue to press for Shetland's position to be considered through the establishment of a Commission as proposed by Mr J. Grimond?

Results
Choice	Votes	%
Yes	9,126	89.88%
No	1,028	10.12%
Valid votes	10,154	99.29%
Invalid or blank votes	73	0.71%
Total votes	10,227	100.00%
Registered voters/turnout	14,242	71.81%

In March 1978 a referendum was held in Shetland regarding the position of the isles within a potential Scottish Assembly. The isles' MP Jo Grimond had submitted an amendment to the Scotland Bill seeking to establish a commission in the event of a successful vote for a Scottish Assembly. This amendment faced opposition from the Secretary of State for Scotland, Bruce Millan. With Jo Grimond's support, the Shetland Islands Council held the referendum to gauge the electorate's support for its position in the hope that it would give the council a mandate to push for separate consideration for Shetland in the Bill.

The question asked was:

In view of the proposals for devolution for Scotland, do you agree that the Shetland Islands Council should continue to press for Shetland's position to be considered through the establishment of a commission as proposed by Mr Grimond?

== Results ==
Choice	Votes	%
Yes	9,126	89.88
No	1,028	10.12
Total	10,154	100.00
Valid votes	10,154	99.29
Invalid/blank votes	73	0.71
Total votes	10,227	100.00
Registered voters/turnout	14,242	71.81
Source: Shetland in Statistics, 1980

== Aftermath ==
The referendum provided a resounding victory for the Council and Grimond's position, and the Scotland Act 1978 would contain provisions for setting up a commission for Orkney and Shetland.

Plans for a Scottish Assembly ultimately failed as a result of the 1979 Scottish devolution referendum, ensuring a continuation of the status quo for Shetland. However, the constitutional debate fostered in part by the referendum led to the creation of the pro-autonomy Shetland Movement.
