= 2006 Comorian presidential election =

Election of Ahmed Abdallah Mohamed Sambi

- 16 April 2006 (first round); 14 May 2006 (second round)
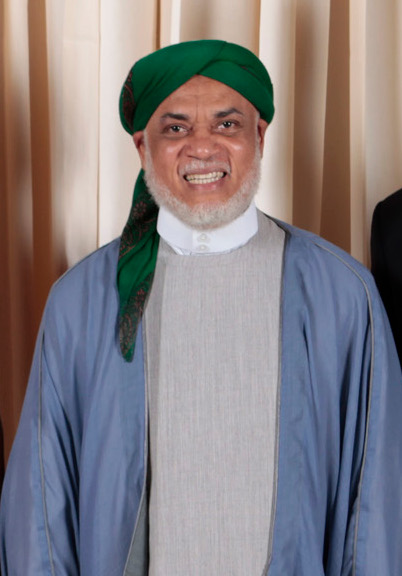

Nominee	Ahmed Abdallah Mohamed Sambi	Ibrahim Halidi	Mohamed Djaanfari
Party	Independent	MPC	Independent
Popular vote	99,112	48,378	23,322
Percentage	58.02%	28.32%	13.65%
President before election
Azali Assoumani
Elected President
Ahmed Abdallah Mohamed Sambi

Presidential elections were held in the Comoros on 16 April and 14 May 2006. As it was the turn of the island of Anjouan to hold the union presidency, a primary election was held in Anjouan on 16 April, prior to a national election on 14 May. The result was a victory for Ahmed Abdallah Mohamed Sambi, who received 58% of the vote in the national election.

== Background ==
The first presidential elections held under the new constitution were conducted on 10 March and 14 April 2002. In the 10 March primary held on the island of Grande Comore, Azali Assoumani finished first out of a field of nine candidates with 39.81% of the vote. Mahamoud Mradabi and Saïd Ali Kemal also qualified to participate in the second round, obtaining 15.69% and 10.68%, respectively. However, Mradabi and Kemal alleged that irregularities had occurred during the primary and decided to boycott the 14 April poll. As a result, Azali Assoumani won approximately 80% of the vote.

A total of fourteen candidates were cleared to participate in the 2006 primaries by the country's constitutional court. However, one of the approved candidates, Antoy Abdou, withdrew prior to election day.

== Electoral system ==
After a period of political instability that began in the late 1990s and saw the (unrecognized) secession of Anjouan and Mohéli, a new constitution was approved in a December 2001 referendum. It created a union of semi-autonomous islands, each with its own constitution, president, and assembly. The position of union president, who is the head of state and government, rotates between the three islands every four years.

A primary election is held on the island that will hold the union presidency. The three candidates who receive the most votes then stand in a nationwide election with a simple plurality needed to win.

== Results ==
Candidate	Party	Anjouan primary		National vote	
Candidate	Party	Votes	%	Votes	%
Ahmed Abdallah Mohamed Sambi	Independent	14,568	26.93	99,112	58.02
Mohamed Djaanfari	Independent	8,052	14.88	23,322	13.65
Ibrahim Halidi	Movement for the Comoros	6,376	11.79	48,378	28.32
Caabi El-Yachroutu Mohamed	Independent	5,877	10.86		
Nourdine Midiladji	Independent	5,221	9.65		
Nassuf Ahmed Abdallah	Independent	3,276	6.06		
Halidy Charif	Independent	2,868	5.30		
Said Ali Youssouf	Independent	2,353	4.35		
Chadhouli Abdou	Rally for a Development Initiative with an Enlightened Youth	1,918	3.55		
Moussa Houmadi	Democratic Front	960	1.77		
Loutfi Soulaimane	Comorian Party for Democracy and Progress	952	1.76		
Abdourahmane Mohamed Ben Ali	Independent	939	1.74		
Mohamed Ahmed Chamanga	Independent	738	1.36		
Total		54,098	100.00	170,812	100.00
Valid votes		54,098	94.96	170,812	96.18
Invalid/blank votes		2,873	5.04	6,789	3.82
Total votes		56,971	100.00	177,601	100.00
Registered voters/turnout		117,249	48.59	310,177	57.26
Source: African Elections Database, IFES
