= 1978 United States House of Representatives election in Vermont =

- November 7, 1978
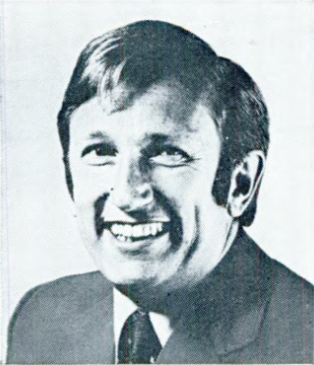

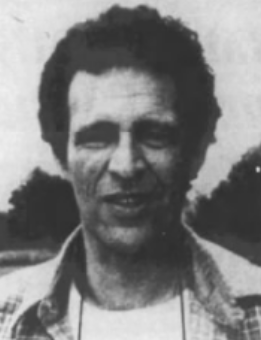
Nominee	Jim Jeffords	Sarah Dietz	Peter Diamondstone
Party	Republican	Democratic	Liberty Union
Popular vote	90,688	23,228	6,505
Percentage	75.31%	19.29%	5.40%
- Jeffords: 40–50% 50–60% 60–70% 70–80% 80–90% >90%
Representative
At-large before election
Jim Jeffords
Republican
Elected Representative
At-large
Jim Jeffords
Republican

The 1978 United States House of Representatives election in Vermont was held on November 7, 1978. Republican incumbent, Jim Jeffords defeated Democratic candidate Sarah Dietz and Liberty Union Party nominee Peter Diamondstone with 75.3% of the vote.

Primary elections were held on September 12 with a competitive Democratic Party Primary.

== Democratic primary ==
Democratic primary results
Party	Candidate	Votes	%
Democratic	Sarah Marie Dietz	6,056	51.8
Democratic	Elwyn N. Kernstock	5,645	48.2
Total votes		11,701	100.00

== General election ==
Vermont's at-large congressional district election, 1980
Party	Candidate	Votes	%
Republican	Jim Jeffords (incumbent)	90,688	75.31
Democratic	Sarah Marie Dietz	23,228	19.29
Liberty Union	Peter Diamondstone	6,505	5.40
Total votes		120,421	100.00
Republican hold			
