= Haribou Chebani =

Former chief of the Supreme Court of the Comoros

Haribou Chebani was chief of the Supreme Court of the Comoros in the 1980s. Although Said Mohamed Djohar had already become head of the Supreme Court in 1988, initial reports after the 1989 assassination of President Ahmed Abdallah suggested, apparently based on outdated information, that Chebani would succeed as head of state. Later reports correctly indicated that it was Djohar, yet the contradictory information led to a false synthesis in a Library of Congress country study that the coup leaders ousted Chebani.
