= 1978 American Samoan referendum =

American Samoan ballot measure

A referendum on sessions of Fono was held in American Samoa on November 7, 1978. Voters were asked to approve a proposed amendment which would elongate sessions of Fono from 30 days to 45 days. The measure was approved and entered into law.
