= Ahmed Ben Cheikh Attoumane =

Prime Minister of the Comoros

Ahmed Ben Cheikh Attoumane (born 1938) is a former politician in the Comoros. A former presidential adviser, he served as Prime Minister of Comoros from 20 June 1993 until 2 January 1994, leaving his post amid a domestic crisis that saw public unrest. He replaced Saïd Ali Mohamed as Prime Minister.

Political offices
Preceded by Said Ali Mohamed	Prime Minister of the Comoros; 1993–1994	Succeeded by Mohamed Abdou Madi
