= 1978 Tongan general election =

General elections were held in Tonga on 14 April 1978. Seven nobles were elected by their peers, whilst a further seven People's Representatives were publicly elected. All candidates ran as independents.
