= Nguzo =

Nguzo was a political party in the Comoros.

== History ==
The party received 2.7% of the vote in the 1992 parliamentary elections, winning one seat in the Assembly of the Union. Nguzo spokesman Mohamed Djimbanaou, later Ambassador to France, was elected to the Assembly for the party.
