= 1978 Comorian presidential election =

Election of Ahmed Abdallah

- 22 October 1978
| Nominee | Ahmed Abdallah |
| Party | Independent |
| Popular vote | 195,186 |
| Percentage | 100% |
President before election
Said Mohamed Jaffar
Elected President
Ahmed Abdallah
UCP

Presidential elections were held in the Comoros on 22 October 1978 following the approval of a new constitution in a referendum earlier in the month. The only candidate was Ahmed Abdallah, who had been President at the time of independence, before being ousted in a coup on 2 August 1975, then reinstated following another on 13 May 1978, since which he had held the post of "Co-Chairman of the Politico-Military Directorate of the Federal and Islamic Republic of Comoros" alongside Mohamed Ahmed. He was elected unopposed.

== Results ==
| Candidate | Party | Votes | % |
|---|---|---|---|
| Ahmed Abdallah | Independent | 195,186 | 100.00 |
| Total | | 195,186 | 100.00 |
| Valid votes | | 195,186 | 99.95 |
| Invalid/blank votes | | 104 | 0.05 |
| Total votes | | 195,290 | 100.00 |
| Registered voters/turnout | | 197,600 | 98.83 |
Source: African Elections Database
