= Salim Ben Ali =

Comoran politician (1918–2002)

Salim Ben Ali Al-Qasimi (1918–2002) served as prime minister of the Comoros under President Ahmed Abdallah from 22 December 1978 until 8 February 1982.

His stepson is Abbas Djoussouf, who was the prime minister of the Comoros from 22 November 1998 to 30 April 1999.

Political offices
| Preceded by Abdallah Mohamed | Prime Minister of the Comoros; 1978-1982 | Succeeded by Ali Mroudjaé |
