= Bianrifi Tarmidi =

Bianrifi Tarmidi (born 1958) is the former Prime Minister of the Comoros from 2 December 1999 until 29 November 2000. He was appointed to his position under Colonel and President Azali Assoumani after he seized power in an April 1999 coup. He was appointed to ease international pressure on the regime, although Assoumani retained all power.

Bianrifi Tarmidi is currently minister of justice and interior in the autonomous government of Mohéli.

Political offices
Preceded by Abbas Djoussouf	Prime Minister of the Comoros; 1999–2000	Succeeded by Hamada Madi
