= Ahmed Abdou =

Prime Minister of Comoros from 1996 to 1997

- Born: 1936; Mutsamudu, Comoros
- Died: 28 November 2024 (aged 88); Mutsamudu, Comoros
- Occupation: Politician

Ahmed Abdou (1936 – 28 November 2024) was a Comorian politician. He served as Prime Minister of Comoros from 27 December 1996 to 9 September 1997.

== Early life ==
Abdou was born in Mutsamudu on the island of Anjouan.

== Career ==
Abdou served as Minister of Finance briefly during 1972, and again from 1973 until the country received independence in 1975. He became prominent again over 20 years later when in December 1996, he was appointed Prime Minister of Comoros.

In May 1997 there was a movement to dismiss him, but he survived a parliamentary confidence vote 38–2. The government ran into serious trouble in August 1997 when two of the Comoros's islands, including Abdou's home island of Anjouan, seceded from the union and Abdou was dismissed in September 1997 after 9 months in office.

He died in Mutsamudu on 28 November 2024, at the age of 88.

Political offices
Preceded by Tadjidine Ben Said Massounde	Prime Minister of the Comoros; 1996–1997	Succeeded by Nourdine Bourhane
