= Halifa Houmadi =

Comorian politician

Halifa Houmadi is a Comoran politician who served as prime minister of Comoros.

== Career ==
In 14 October 1994, he was appointed as prime minister by Said Mohamed Djohar. He was fifteenth prime minister appointed by Said Mohamed Djohar. On 29 April 1995 he resigned as prime minister.
