= 1992 Comorian parliamentary election =

Parliamentary elections were held in the Comoros on 22 November 1992, with a second round on 29 November 1992. Due to electoral irregularities in the initial elections, there were also by-elections in six of the 42 constituencies on 13 and 20 December. They were the first multi-party parliamentary elections in the Comoros since independence in 1975.

The election was contested by 320 candidates representing 22 parties, although the Comorian Union for Progress and the National Union for Democracy in the Comoros both boycotted it in protest at the government's refusal to update voting lists and the detention of major politicians. The Union of Democrats for Development emerged as the largest party, although it won only seven seats. Voter turnout was 69.3%.

== Results ==
The results in six seats were annulled. In the subsequent by-elections in December for five of the six seats, the Movement for Democracy and Progress won two seats, with the Comorian Party for Democracy and Progress, the Democratic Front of the Comoros and Twamaya winning one each.

Party	Votes	%	Seats
Movement for Democracy and Progress	15,194	10.43	3
Union of Democrats for Development	14,961	10.27	7
Rally for Change and Democracy	11,810	8.10	1
Democratic Front of the Comoros	11,615	7.97	2
Maecha Bora	9,730	6.68	3
Comorian Party for Democracy and Progress	9,317	6.39	3
Islands' Fraternity and Unity Party	9,030	6.20	3
Dialogue Proposition Action	7,812	5.36	1
Realising Freedom's Capability	7,674	5.27	1
National Front for Justice	4,982	3.42	1
Movement for Renewal and Democratic Action	4,492	3.08	1
Nguzo	4,009	2.75	1
Comorian Popular Front	3,550	2.44	2
Party for National Salvation	3,394	2.33	1
SNDC	3,000	2.06	0
PDPC/Marouf	2,646	1.82	0
Twamaani	1,497	1.03	0
RDDC	1,345	0.92	0
Twamaya	1,239	0.85	0
FDP	386	0.26	0
Socialist Party of Comoros	368	0.25	0
PCN	110	0.08	0
Other parties	3,688	2.53	0
Independents	13,892	9.53	7
Annulled			6
Total	145,741	100.00	43
Valid votes	145,819	98.17	
Invalid/blank votes	2,717	1.83	
Total votes	148,536	100.00	
Registered voters/turnout	214,374	69.29	
Source: Nohlen et al.. (Note: The reported number of valid votes was 78 higher than the total votes received by candidates.)
