= Mohamed Abdoulwahab =

President of Grande Comore (born 1959)

- Born: 31 December 1959 (age 66)
- Occupation: President of Comoros
- Years active: 30 June 2007 – Present

Mohamed Abdoulwahab (also spelled Abdouloihabi) (born 31 December 1959) is a Comorian politician. He was president of the autonomous island of Grande Comore in the Comoros from 30 June 2007 to 2011.

A lawyer and veteran politician, he held several posts in previous national governments, including interior minister (October 1994 – April 1995), foreign minister (April–September 1995), and justice minister (May–August 1996).
