= Comorian Democratic Union =

Political party

Comorian Democratic Union Union Démocratique des Comores
- Leader: Said Mohamed Cheikh (1968–1970); Ahmed Abdallah (1968–1982)
- Founded: 1968
- Ideology: Conservatism

The Comorian Democratic Union (French: Union Démocratique des Comores, UDC) was a political party in the Comoros.

== History ==
The party was established in 1968, and was based mainly in Grande Comore. It became known as the "Green Party", as it used green ballots during elections. Its first president was Said Mohamed Cheikh, who died in 1970. He was succeeded by Ahmed Abdallah, who would become the first president of Comoros in 1975.

In the 1972 cantonal elections the UDC formed an alliance with the Democratic Rally of the Comorian People, winning 34 of the 39 seats.
