= Camp of the Autonomous Islands =

The Camp of the Autonomous Islands (French: Camp des Îles Autonomes, CdIA) was a political alliance in the Comoros. It advocated for greater autonomy for the three islands and for more power to be given to the islands' governors.

== History ==
The alliance was formed prior to the 2004 parliamentary elections, and included the Movement for Democracy and Progress, the Democratic Front of the Comoros, the Islands' Fraternity and Unity Party, the National Rally for Development and the Comorian Party for Democracy and Progress. The parties supported greater autonomy for the islands.

The alliance won 12 of the 18 elected seats in the 2004 parliamentary elections, and all 15 of the indirectly-elected seats.
