= Mohamed Abdou Madi =

Comorian politician

Mohamed Abdou Madi is a Comorian politician who served as prime minister of the Comoros from 2 January 1994 to 14 October 1994. He was appointed by Said Mohamed Djohar.

== Career ==
In 1994 he became Prime Minister and later became Justice minister in 1998. On 14 October 1994, Said Mohamed Djohar dismissed him as Prime minister of Comoros and appointed Halifa Houmadi.
