= Movement for the Comoros =

Political party in the comoros

The Movement for the Comoros (French: Mouvement pour les Comores, MPC) was a political party in the Comoros.

== History ==
The party was established in 1997 by Saïd Hilali. It nominated its secretary-general Ibrahim Halidi as its candidate for the 2006 presidential elections. In the nationwide second round of voting, Halidi came second with 28% of the vote.
