= Abdallah Mohamed =

Comorian politician (died 2000)

Abdallah Mohamed (died 3 February 2000) was a Comorian politician. He served as the prime minister of Comoros from January 7, 1976, until December 22, 1978. He was a nephew of Mohamed Ahmed. For most of that time he was serving under President Ali Soilih. After Soilih was overthrown and killed in a Coup d'état, Mohamed remained in his post for a few months under the new regime of Ahmed Abdallah. He was eventually dismissed, however. He died in Mutsamudu, on the island of Anjouan in 2000.

Political offices
Preceded by office created	Prime Minister of the Comoros; 1976-1978	Succeeded by Salim Ben Ali
