= Ibrahim Halidi =

Comorian politician (1954–2020)

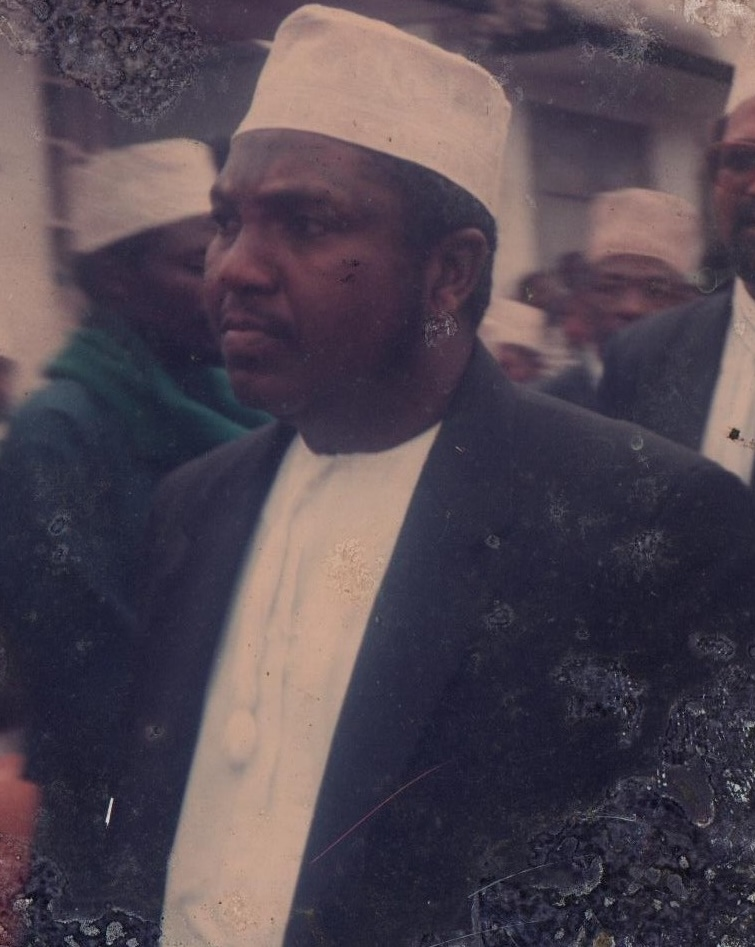
Ibrahim Halidi

Ibrahim Halidi (Arabic: إبراهيم هاليدي; 1954 – 23 February 2020), or officially Halidi Abderemane Ibrahim, was a Comorian politician, philosophy teacher and writer.

== Biography ==
Officially born in Adda Daoueni, he was actually born in Bandracouni, the village of his mother Naïme Mouchidra Moussa. He was born Djamil Halidi but was renamed Ibrahim Halidi in 1960 when he lived in Ouani to receive treatment and attend school.

Ibrahim Halidi supervised the National Revolutionary Youth Committee and was the second most important person for Ali Soilih's regime. When Ali Soilih and his government resigned, Ibrahim Halidi became president for about a month. The revolutionary regime sentenced Ibrahim Halidi to death in 1977 at a trial in the Hotel Alamal.

After the May 1978 coup against Ali Soilih, Ibrahim Halidi was imprisoned in Hombo and Patsy in Anjouan. He obtained his baccalaureate in 1978 and went to Togo to study philosophy and education at the University of Lomé. He returned to the Comoros in 1983 and taught philosophy at a secondary school in Fomboni (Moheli), then in Mutsamudu and Domoni (Anjouan).

After the 1990 presidential election, Ibrahim Halidi became Minister of the Interior, then Minister of Information, Culture, Youth and Sport. He founded the Union of Democrats for Development (UDD) party with Saïd El Anis Mohamed Djohar and Mohamed Dhakoine Abdou. After the general elections of 22 and 29 November 1992, Ibrahim Halidi became a member of parliament, before being appointed Prime Minister of the Comoros from January to May 1993.

Ibrahim Halidi stood in the presidential elections of March 1996. After this election, he became Minister of Public Health, Population and Social Affairs, then Minister of Transport, Tourism and Telecommunications.

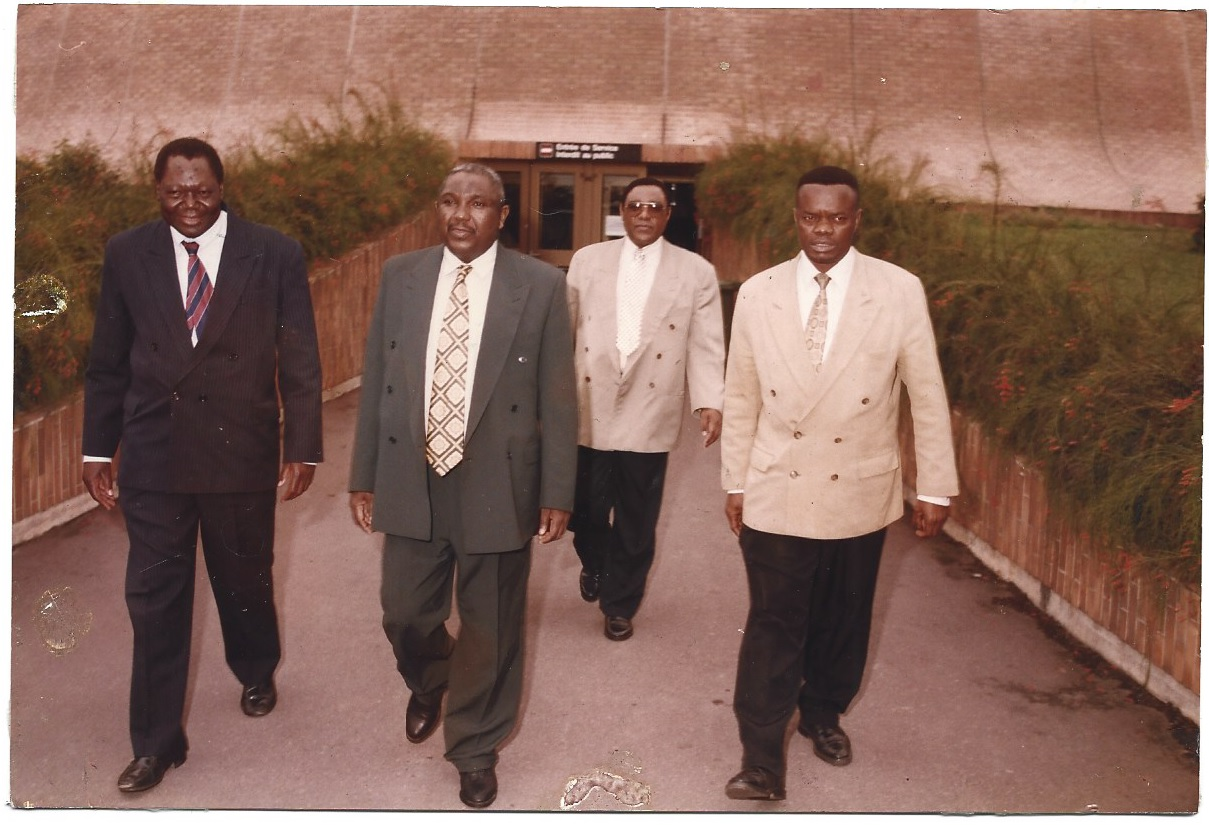
Halidi en Afrique du sud

After the dissolution of the Union of Democrats for Development (UDD), Ibrahim Halidi became secretary general and then president of another party, the Movement for the Comoros (MPC). In December 2002, he ran for president of the autonomous island of Anjouan and came second. In the presidential elections of April and May 2006, he also stood for election and came second.

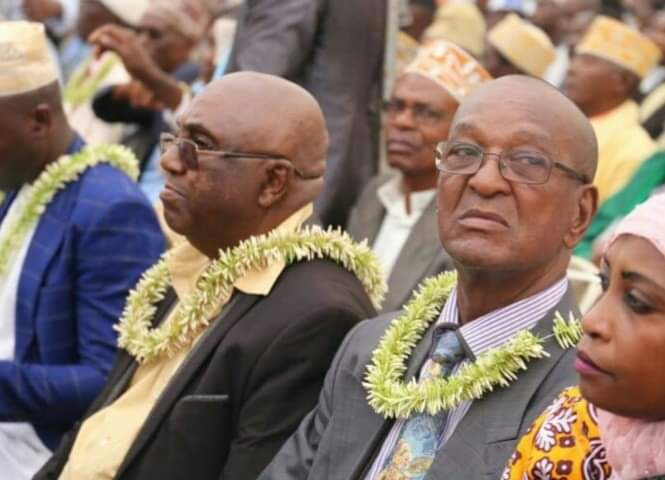
Anis Djohar et Ibrahim Halidi

He was diagnosed with brain cancer in 2017 in Tananarive. He underwent treatment in Madagascar, Mauritius and Tanzania. He died in Mamoudzou hospital in Mayotte on 23 February 2020.

He is the author of the book Comores. Unité dans la pluralité, published in 2021 by L'Harmattan.

Political offices
Preceded by Post re-established	Prime Minister of the Comoros; 1993	Succeeded by Said Ali Mohamed
