= Tadjidine Ben Said Massounde =

Interim 22nd and President of Comoros from 1998 to 1999

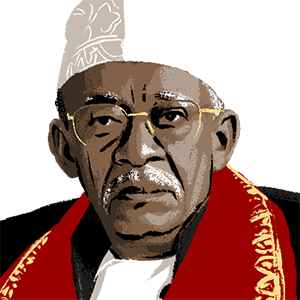
An illustration of Massounde produced by Voice of America

Tadjidine Ben Said Massounde (Arabic: تاج الدين بن سعيد مسوندي; 1928–2004) was a Comorian politician.

He was born in 1928 in Domoni on Anjouan. Ahmed Abdallah Abderemane was his brother-in-law. Since 1978, Tadjidine worked as director of finance in the public treasury. He became paymaster-general in 1988 and held the post until March 1990. President Saïd Mohamed Djohar appointed him as the Minister of Finance and Budget.

President Mohamed Taki Abdoulkarim appointed Tadjidine as the Prime Minister from 27 March 1996 to 27 December 1996. After the death of President Taki on 6 November 1998, he became interim President. His government was overthrown in a 30 April 1999 military coup led by Colonel Azali Assoumani.

He died on 29 February 2004.

Political offices
Preceded by Caabi El-Yachroutu Mohamed	Prime Minister of the Comoros; 1996	Succeeded by Ahmed Abdou
Preceded by Mohamed Taki Abdoulkarim	President of the Comoros; 1998–1999	Succeeded by Azali Assoumani
