= Mohamed Dahalani =

Comorian politician

- Born: January 1, 1917
- Died: July 24, 1981; Bagneux
- Citizenship: Comoros
- Occupation: Politician

Mohamed Dahalani (born January 1, 1917, in Moroni, Comoros, and died July 24, 1981, in Bagneux, France) was a politician from Comoros who served in the French National Assembly from 1970 to 1978.
