= 2004 Comorian parliamentary election =

Parliamentary elections were held in the Comoros on 18 April 2004, with a second round on 25 April. The result was a victory for the Camp of the Autonomous Islands, which won 12 of the 18 elected seats.

== Background ==
Following the previous elections in 1996, a political crisis had led to Anjouan and Mohéli seeking to secede from the Union. A 1999 coup led to Azali Assoumani taking power. A new constitution was introduced in 2001, decentralising power by granting autonomy to the three islands. Azali subsequently won presidential elections in 2002, which were boycotted by the opposition.

== Electoral system ==
At the time of the elections, only 18 of the 33 members of the Assembly of the Union were directly elected in single-member constituencies. The remaining 15 were chosen by the legislatures of the three islands, Anjouan, Mohéli and Grande Comore, with each island electing five members.

The direct elections were held in 18 single-member constituencies using the two-round system.

== Campaign ==
In 2004 there was only one national political party, the Convention for the Renewal of the Comoros led by Assoumani, which favoured more centralised government. Prior to the elections a loose coalition, the Camp of the Autonomous Islands, was formed by opposition groups organised by the presidents of the three islands.

== Results ==
| Party | First round | | | Second round | | | Total seats | +/– |
| Party | Votes | % | Seats | Votes | % | Seats | Total seats | +/– |
|---|---|---|---|---|---|---|---|---|
| Camp of the Autonomous Islands | | | 8 | | | 4 | 12 | New |
| Convention for the Renewal of the Comoros | | | 2 | | | 4 | 6 | New |
| Indirectly-elected members | | | | | | | 15 | – |
| Total | | | 10 | | | 8 | 33 | –10 |
Source: IPU

All fifteen of the indirectly-elected seats were won by the Camp of the Autonomous Islands.
