= Rally for Democracy and Renewal =

Political party in the Comoros

The Rally for Democracy and Renewal (French: Rassemblement pour la Démocratie et le Renouveau, RDR) is a political party in the Comoros.

== History ==
The RDR was founded in October 1993 by President Said Mohamed Djohar, and was a merger of several pro-Djohar parties, including Dialogue Proposition Action and the Union of Democrats for Development. The new party won 28 of the 42 seats in the Assembly of the Union in the December 1993 elections. Following the elections, the RDR secretary general Mohamed Abdou Madi was appointed prime minister.

In December 1996 the party merged into the new National Rally for Development. It was later resurrected, and contested the 2015 parliamentary elections, failing to win a seat.
