= 1999 Comorian coup d'état =

1999 military coup in Comoros

| Date | 29 April - 30 April 1999 |
| Location | Comoros |
| Result | Coup d'état successful: Tadjidine Ben Said Massounde was removed from power; Azali Assoumani was installed as the President of the Council of State of the Comoros |

Belligerents
| Comoros government | Comorian Armed Forces |

Commanders and leaders
| Tadjidine Ben Said Massounde | Col. Azali Assoumani |

The 1999 Comorian coup d'état was a two-day long bloodless military takeover in the Comoros led by Colonel Azali Assoumani from April 29 to April 30, resulting in the overthrow of interim president Tadjidine Ben Said Massonde. The coup was ostensibly carried out to restore order and prevent further attacks on Anjouanese residents in Grande Comore amid the country's secession crisis involving the islands of Anjouan and Mohéli.

== Background ==
In March 1996, Mohamed Taki Abdoulkarim won the presidency in free and fair elections. During his short-lived reign, the country adopted a new constitution that limited the local autonomy of the islands and strengthened the use of Islamic law, fueling unrest and helping spark the secession crisis.

In August 1997, the islands of Anjouan and Mohéli unilaterally declared their independence from the Comoros, citing neglect and discrimination by the central government. A month later, on September 3, government forces numbering about 300 landed on Anjouan to prevent its secession but were repulsed.

In November 1998, President Mohamed Taki Abdoulkarim died suddenly and was replaced by interim President Tadjidine Ben Said Massonde. His delays in holding new elections caused widespread discontent.

By April 1999, the Organization of African Unity (OAU) brokered a reunification accord that would grant greater autonomy to Anjouan and Mohéli and introduce a rotating presidency. While President Massonde signed the agreement, hardline separatists on Anjouan rejected the deal, demanding full independence instead. Mohéli separatists were more willing to negotiate.

The Anjouanese separatists' refusal to accept the peace deal led to the victimization of Anjouanese residents on Grande Comore, causing violent demonstrations on the island demanding they leave. As a result, nearly 1,000 people reportedly left Grande Comore for Anjouan.

== Coup attempt ==
On April 29, 1999, amidst the turmoil engulfing Grande Comore, the Comorian military, led by Colonel Azali Assoumani, staged a bloodless two-day long coup and ousted President Massonde to stop the escalating violence. After seizing power, Colonel Assoumani suspended the constitution and dissolved the country's political institutions, including parliament. Political activity and public gatherings were also banned. The ousted acting president and other government officials were ordered to remain in their homes.

== Aftermath ==
On May 6, 1999, President Assoumani consolidated power by decreeing a new constitution that granted himself both executive and legislative powers. Shortly after, a predominantly civilian cabinet was formed, but the regime's directorate, where real power was held, consisted primarily of military personnel.

By 2000, amid growing international criticism of Azali's regime, he promised to relinquish power by April 14 of that year, under the condition that Anjouan rejoined the republic.

Later that year, President Assoumani appointed Bianrifi Tarmidi as the civilian prime minister but still retained control as head of state and commander-in-chief.
