= 1978 Comorian constitutional referendum =

A constitutional referendum was held in the Comoros on 1 October 1978 following the overthrow of Ali Soilih on 13 May. The new constitution created a presidential and federal republic, granting each island its own legislature and control over taxes levied on individuals and businesses resident on the island, whilst reserving strong executive powers for the president. It also restored Islam as the state religion, while acknowledging the rights of those who did not observe the Muslim faith.

The new constitution was approved by 99.31% of voters.

== Results ==
Choice	Votes	%
For		99.31
Against		0.69
Total		
Registered voters/turnout	187,124	–
Source: African Elections Database
