= 1992 Comorian constitutional referendum =

- 7 June 1992

Results
Choice	Votes	%
Yes	100,792	75.66%
No	32,433	24.34%
Valid votes	133,225	98.14%
Invalid or blank votes	2,525	1.86%
Total votes	135,750	100.00%

A constitutional referendum was held in the Comoros on 7 June 1992. The proposed amendments to the constitution were approved by 76% of voters, with voter turnout at around 64%.

== Results ==
Choice	Votes	%
For	100,792	75.66
Against	32,433	24.34
Total	133,225	100.00
Valid votes	133,225	98.14
Invalid/blank votes	2,525	1.86
Total votes	135,750	100.00
Source: African Elections Database
