= 1996 Comorian parliamentary election =

Parliamentary elections were held in the Comoros on 1 December 1996, with a second round in six seats on 8 December. The result was a victory for the National Rally for Development, which won 36 of the 43 seats, some of them uncontested. In addition to independent candidates, the only other party to run was the National Front for Justice following a boycott by several parties in protest at the lack of an independent electoral commission and revision of the electoral registers. Voter turnout was very low, at around 20%.

== Results ==
Party	Seats	+/–
National Rally for Development	36	New
National Front for Justice	3	New
Independents	4	+4
Total	43	+1
Source: IPU
