= 1993 Comorian parliamentary election =

Parliamentary elections in the Comoros

Early parliamentary elections were held in the Comoros on 12 December 1993, with a second round in all but four seats on 20 December. The elections were held after President Said Mohamed Djohar dissolved the Federal Assembly elected in November 1992.

The result was a victory for the Djohar's Rally for Democracy and Renewal party, which won 28 of the 42 seats.

== Results ==
Party	Seats	+/–
Rally for Democracy and Renewal	28	New
National Union for Democracy in the Comoros	4	New
Comorian Popular Front	2	0
Movement for Democracy and Progress	2	–3
Comorian Union for Progress	2	New
Comorian Party for Democracy and Progress	1	–2
Rally for Change and Democracy	1	0
Realising Freedom's Capability	1	0
Islands' Fraternity and Unity Party	1	–2
Total	42	0
Source: IPU
