= Mtara Maécha =

Comorian politician

Mtara Maecha (born 28 February 1940) is a Comorian politician. He was foreign minister of Comoros from 1990 to 1991. He was replaced by Said Hassane Said Hachim.
