= Abbas Djoussouf =

Comorian politician (1942–2010)

Abbas Djoussouf (22 March 1942 – 13 June 2010) was a politician in The Comoros. He was prime minister from 22 November 1998 until 30 April 1999. He was the main opposition leader when named prime minister by Tadjidine Ben Said Massounde in a move to help soothe secessionist movements across The Comoros. He lost office when Colonel Azali Assoumani assumed power in a military coup on 30 April.

His stepdad is Salim Ben Ali, who was the prime minister of the Comoros from 22 December 1978 until 8 February 1982.

Political offices
| Preceded by Nourdine Bourhane | Prime Minister of the Comoros; 1998–1999 | Succeeded by Bianrifi Tarmidi |
