= Ali Mroudjaé =

Comoran politician (1939–2019)

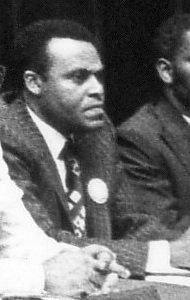
Mroudjaé in 1979

Ali Mroudjae (2 August 1939 – 2 May 2019) was a prime minister and foreign minister of the Comoros. He became foreign minister after the coup by Bob Denard brought Ahmed Abdallah to power in 1978. Mroudjaé continued in that position until 8 February 1982, when he became prime minister. He left the office of Prime Minister on 31 December 1984. He was part of the Comorian Union for Progress.

== Biography ==
Mroudjaé attended the École normale supérieure des lettres et sciences humaines de Lyon. After a coup by Bob Denard (1929–2007), Ahmed Abdallah presented to the government the Minister of Foreign Affairs, Mroudjaé in 1978. In this post, he worked until 8 February 1982 as a member of the prime minister of the Comorian Union for Progress. He held this position until 31 December 1984. In 2002, he ran again in the elections but only reached 4.2%.

Mroudjaé died after a long illness on 2 May 2019 in Moroni. He was 79.

Political offices
Preceded by Abdallah Mohamed	Prime Minister of the Comoros; 1982–1984	Succeeded by office abolished
