= Mohamed Taki Abdoulkarim =

President of Comoros from 1996 to 1998

- محمد تقي عبد الكريم
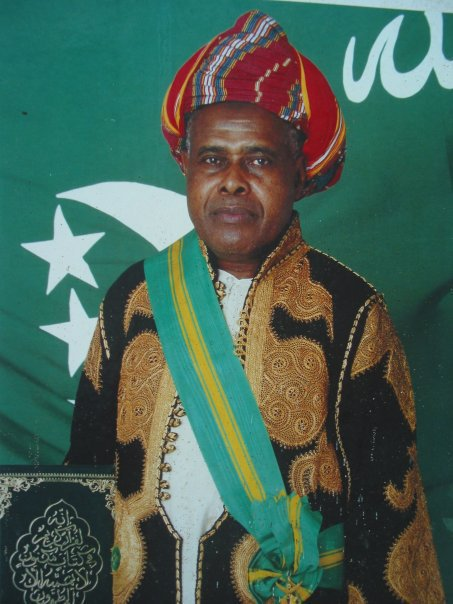

6th President of the Comoros
- In office 25 March 1996 – 6 November 1998
- Prime Minister: Tadjidine Ben Said Massounde; Ahmed Abdou; Nourdine Bourhane; Vacant
- Preceded by: Said Mohamed Djohar
- Succeeded by: Tadjidine Ben Said Massounde (Acting)

Personal details
- Born: 20 February 1936 Mbeni, Grande Comore
- Died: 6 November 1998 (aged 62) Moroni, Comoros

Mohamed Taki Abdoulkarim (Arabic: محمد تقي عبد الكريم; 20 February 1936 – 6 November 1998) served as the sixth President of the Comoros from 25 March 1996 until his death on 6 November 1998.

== Life ==
He was born in Mbeni, Grande Comore and issued family privileges, he was the beneficiary of Djumbé Fumu, clan of ba wazir descendant of Sultan Boina Hadji. He studied in Madagascar as a child then went to France to continue his education and obtain an engineering degree in public works. Returning to Grande Comore, Said Mohamed Cheikh made him responsible for the public works in Anjouan where he made the acquaintance of Ahmed Abdallah.

== Career positions ==
- 1970 : Minister of Development under the second government of Said Ibrahim Ben Ali
- 1971 : Minister of Education
- 1972 : Minister of Rural Development under the government of Saïd Mohamed Jaffar
- 1973 : Minister of Special Planning under Ahmed Abdallah
- 1975 : Minister of the Interior

He took refuge in Mbeni under the regime of Ali Soilih, resisting with civil disobedience and jailed. He was freed from captivity by mercenaries. In 1978 he was the Secretary of the Directory Counsel presided by Ahmed Abdallah. From 1978 to 1984 he was the President of the Federal Assembly He broke ties with Abdallah and took refuge in France from December 1984 until January 1990.

== Later political career ==
In 1990, Taki returned to the country and became a candidate for president in the 1990 elections after the death of Abdallah. However, Said Mohamed Djohar won the elections. Taki then took refuge in France again from March 1990 to November 1991. He served as Prime Minister from 7 January 1992 to 15 July 1992 and was acting President from 2 October 1995 to 5 October 1995. He was elected President of the Comoros from 25 March 1996 until his death on 6 November 1998.

Political offices
Preceded by Post abolished	Prime Minister of the Comoros; 1992	Succeeded by Vacant
Preceded by Combo Ayouba	Acting President of the Comoros; 1995	Succeeded by Caabi El-Yachroutu Mohamed
Preceded by Said Mohamed Djohar	President of the Comoros; 1996–1998	Succeeded by Tadjidine Ben Said Massounde
