= Saïd Mohamed Cheikh =

Comoran-French diplomat and politician

Saïd Mohamed Ben Chech Abdallah Cheikh (1 July 1904 – 16 March 1970) was the head of the Government of Comoros from 1962 until his death in 1970. Cheikh served in the French National Assembly from 1946 until 1962 and was also the president of the Parti Vert.

== Biography ==
Cheikh was born on 7 April 1904 in Mitsamiouli on Grande Comore. He was a descendent of Sultan Ahmed, and an ancestor one of the royal families of Grande Comore. His father held religious offices. He completed his education at the medical school of Antananarivo in Madagascar qualifying in 1926 in medicine. When he returned to the Comoros Islands, he was the first doctor on the islands. He worked as a doctor during the Second World War in Antananarivo, Madagascar, from 1936 to 1945.

He became a frontrunner in the politics of the Grand Comore when he was part of the delegation in 1940 that helped resolve the crisis in the colonial plantations of Nyumakele. The indigenous population there were revolting due to living conditions which the colonial administration interpreted as a revolt, however Cheikh advocating for a peaceful solution.

In 1954, he was the French diplomatic representative at the United Nations General Assembly. Dr. Said Mohamed Cheikh was considered to be, in the period leading up to independence, the most important political leader in the islands.

Cheikh was elected as the first president of the Governing Council of the Comoros Chamber of Deputies in 1961, a post he held until he died of a heart attack on 16 March 1970 in Antananarivo in Madagascar. Cheikh was buried in Moroni in the Comoros.

== Honours ==
Postage stamps bearing his likeness were issued in 1973. In 1978, the government issued high value gold coins worth 10,000 and 20,000 francs which bore the likeness of Cheikh. Since 2006, he also appears on the 5000 Comoran franc banknote.
