= Said Mohamed Djohar =

President of the Comoros from 1989 to 1995

- سعيد محمد جوهر
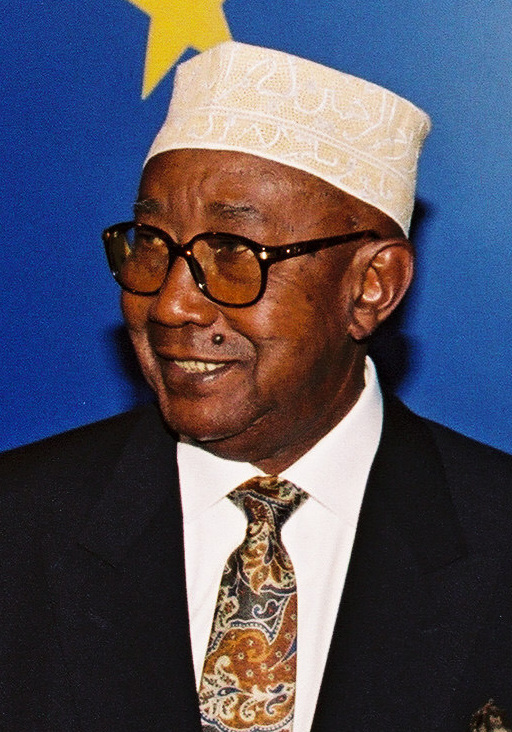
- Djohar in 1991

5th President of the Comoros
- In office 27 November 1989 – 29 September 1995
- Prime Minister: Mohamed Taki Abdoulkarim; Ibrahim Halidi; Said Ali Mohamed; Ahmed Ben Cheikh Attoumane; Mohamed Abdou Madi; Halifa Houmadi; Caabi El-Yachroutu Mohamed
- Preceded by: Haribou Chebani
- Succeeded by: Combo Ayouba
- In office 26 January 1996 – 25 March 1996
- Prime Minister: Caabi El-Yachroutu Mohamed
- Preceded by: Caabi El-Yachroutu Mohamed
- Succeeded by: Mohamed Taki Abdoulkarim

Personal details
- Born: 22 August 1918 Majunga, Madagascar
- Died: 22 February 2006 (aged 87) Moroni, Comoros
- Party: Comorian Democratic Union (1989 – 1995); Rally for Democracy and Renewal (1996)

Said Mohammed Djohar (Arabic: سعيد محمد جوهر 22 August 1918 – 22 February 2006) was a Comorian politician who served as the fifth President of the Comoros from 1989 to 1995.

== Climb to power ==
Born on 22 August in 1918 in Majunga, Madagascar, Djohar was the half brother of socialist Comorian president Ali Soilih, who had been brought to power in a coup d'état organised by Bob Denard. Djohar was minister of public service, labour, youth and sports in 1960s. He was president of the Chamber of Deputies from June to October 1972. After Denard reinstated the previous president, Ahmed Abdallah, Djohar's political aspirations suffered a serious setback. He became a supreme court judge during this time. The conflict between Denard and Abdallah created an opportunity for Djohar, and on November 27, 1989, the day after Abdallah was killed, Djohar became leader of the provisional government. He was elected in the disputed 1990 elections.

== Fall ==
In late September 1995 the government of the Comoros was again overthrown by Bob Denard (Operation Kaskari) and his band of mercenaries, with Djohar being held prisoner in military barracks for several days. The French government flew him to Réunion for 'medical treatment', and denied him a return to the Comoros until January 1996. When he was able to return, he was restored to the presidency by the French Operation Azalee. He left office in March 1996, after Mohamed Taki Abdoulkarim won the presidential election.

Djohar died at his home outside the capital Moroni on 22 February 2006. He was 87 years of age.

Political offices
Preceded by Haribon Chebani	President of the Comoros; 1989–1995	Succeeded by Combo Ayouba
Preceded by Caabi El-Yachroutu Mohamed	President of the Comoros; 1996	Succeeded by Mohamed Taki Abdoulkarim
