= List of rulers of the Comoros =

Overview of Comorian rulers

The following article lists the rulers and heads of state of the Comoros islands.

== Heads of state of the Comoros (1975–present) ==
(Dates in italics indicate de facto continuation of office)

N	Portrait	President (Birth–Death)	Tenure	Political Party
State of the Comoros,Independence from France
1		Mohamed Ahmed	13 August 1957 to 1 January 1962	Inde
2		Saïd Mohamed Cheikh	1 January 1962 to 16 March 1970	Inde
3		Saïd Ibrahim Ben Ali	2 April 1970 to 2 April 1972	Inde
4		Abdallah Mohamed	2 April 1972 to 7 July 1975	Inde
5		Ahmed Abdallah	7 July 1975 to 3 August 1975	UDC
6		Said Mohamed Jaffar	3 August 1975 to 1 January 1976	UNF
7		Mohamed Hassan Ali	1 January 1976 to 30 January 1976	Inde
8		Ali Soilih,	30 January 1976 to 13 May 1977'	UDC
9		Said Atthoumani	13 May 1978 to 23 May 1978	UDC
Federal and Islamic Republic of the Comoros
10		Ahmed Abdallah	23 May 1978 to 22 July 1978	UDC
11		Mohamed Ahmed	23 May 1978 to 22 July 1978	UDC
12		Ahmed Abdallah	22 July 1978 to 3 October 1978	UDC
13		Mohamed Ahmed	3 October 1978 to 3 October 1978	UDC
14		Ahmed Abdallah	3 October 1978 to 26 November 1989	UDC
15		Said Mohamed Djohar	27 November 1989 to 29 September 1995	UCP/RDR
16		Combo Ayouba	29 September 1995 to 2 October 1995	Mil
17		Mohamed Taki Abdoulkarim	2 October 1995 to 4 October 1995	UNDC
18		Said Ali Kemal	4 October 1995 to 5 October 1995	Inde
19		Caabi El-Yachroutu Mohamed	5 October 1995 to 26 January 1996	RDR
20		Said Mohamed Djohar	26 January 1996 to 25 March 1996	RDR
21		Mohamed Taki Abdoulkarim	25 March 1996 to 6 November 1998	RDR
22		Tadjidine Ben Said Massounde,	6 November 1998 to 30 April 1999	RDR
23		Azali Assoumani	30 April 1999 to 21 January 2002	Mil
24		Hamada Madi Bolero	21 January 2002 to 26 May 2002	CRC
25		Azali Assoumani	26 May 2002 to 26 May 2006	CRC
26		Ahmed Abdallah Mohamed Sambi	26 May 2006 to 26 May 2011	BM
27		Ikililou Dhoinine	26 May 2011 to 26 May 2016	BM
28		Azali Assoumani	26 May 2016 to 3 February 2019	CRC
29		Moustadroine Abdou	3 February 2019 to 26 May 2019	CRC
30		Azali Assoumani	26 May 2019 to present	CRC

- Presidents of Comoros

== List of officeholders ==
Portrait	Name	Took office	Left office	Representing	President
State of the Comoros
	Mohamed Hassanaly	January 1976	13 May 1978	Mohéli	Ali Soilih
Union of the Comoros (2002–2019)
	Caabi El-Yachroutu Mohamed	26 May 2002	26 May 2006	Anjouan	Azali Assoumani (Note: Representing Grande Comore.)
	Rachidi ben Massonde	26 May 2002	26 May 2006	Mohéli	Azali Assoumani
	Ikililou Dhoinine	26 May 2006	26 May 2011	Mohéli	Ahmed Abdallah Mohamed Sambi (Note: Representing Anjouan.)
	Idi Nadhoim	26 May 2006	26 May 2011	Grande Comore	Ahmed Abdallah Mohamed Sambi
	Fouad Mohadji	26 May 2011	26 May 2016	Mohéli	Ikililou Dhoinine (Note: Representing Mohéli.)
	Mohamed Ali Soilihi	26 May 2011	26 May 2016	Grande Comore	Ikililou Dhoinine
	Nourdine Bourhane	26 May 2011	26 May 2016	Anjouan	Ikililou Dhoinine
	Abdallah Said Sarouma	26 May 2016	26 May 2019	Mohéli	Azali Assoumani
	Djaffar Ahmed Said	26 May 2016	26 May 2019	Grande Comore	Azali Assoumani
	Moustadroine Abdou	26 May 2016	26 May 2019	Anjouan	Azali Assoumani

== Heads of government ==
Tenure	Portrait	Incumbent	Affiliation	Notes
French Suzerainty
French overseas territory
13 August 1957 to 1 January 1962		Mohamed Ahmed, Vice President of the Government Council	PV	
1 January 1962 to 16 March 1970		Saïd Mohamed Cheikh, President of the Government Council	PV	Died in office
2 April 1970 to 16 June 1972		Saïd Ibrahim Ben Ali, President of the Government Council	PB	
16 June 1972 to 26 December 1972		Said Mohamed Jaffar, President of the Government Council	RDPC	
26 December 1972 to 6 July 1975		Ahmed Abdallah, President of the Government Council	UDC	
State of Comoros	Independence from France			
(Etat Comorien)
7 January 1976 to 24 May 1978		Abdallah Mohamed, Prime Minister	UDC	
Federal and Islamic Republic of Comoros
(République Fédérale Islamique des Comores)
(Jumhuriyat al-Qumur al-Itthadiyah al-Islamiyah)
24 May 1978 to 22 December 1978		Abdallah Mohamed, Prime Minister	UDC	(contd.)
22 December 1978 to 8 February 1982		Salim Ben Ali, Prime Minister	UCP	
8 February 1982 to 31 December 1984		Ali Mroudjaé, Prime Minister	UCP	
31 December 1984 to 7 January 1992	Post abolished			
7 January 1992 to 15 July 1992		Mohamed Taki Abdoulkarim, Prime Minister	RND	
15 July 1992 to 1 January 1993	Vacant			
1 January 1993 to 26 May 1993		Ibrahim Halidi, Prime Minister	UDD	
26 May 1993 to 19 June 1993		Said Ali Mohamed, Prime Minister	RND	
20 June 1993 to 2 January 1994		Ahmed Ben Cheikh Attoumane, Prime Minister	RDR	
2 January 1994 to 14 October 1994		Mohamed Abdou Madi, Prime Minister	RDR	
14 October 1994 to 29 April 1995		Halifa Houmadi, Prime Minister	RDR	
29 April 1995 to 27 March 1996		Caabi El-Yachroutu Mohamed, Prime Minister	RDR	
27 March 1996 to 27 December 1996		Tadjidine Ben Said Massounde, Prime Minister	n-p	
27 December 1996 to 9 September 1997		Ahmed Abdou, Prime Minister	RND	
7 December 1997 to 30 May 1998		Nourdine Bourhane, Prime Minister	n-p	
30 May 1998 to 22 November 1998	Vacant			
22 November 1998 to 30 April 1999		Abbas Djoussouf, Prime Minister	FNR	Deposed in a coup d'état
30 April 1999 to 7 December 1999	Vacant			
2 December 1999 to 29 November 2000		Bianrifi Tarmidi, Prime Minister	n-p	
29 November 2000 to 23 December 2001		Hamada Madi, Prime Minister	PRC	
Union of Comoros (Union des Comores)
الاتحاد القمر (Udzima wa Komori)
23 December 2001 to 15 April 2002		Hamada Madi, Prime Minister	PRC	(contd.)
15 April 2002 to present	Post abolished			

== Colonial governors ==
Tenure	Incumbent	Notes
French Suzerainty
25 March 1841	Annexed by France; ratified 13 June 1843	
Colony of Mayotte
1841 to June 1843	Pierre Passot, French Representative	
Subordinated to the governors of Île de Bourbon/Réunion
June 1843 to 11 March 1844	Pierre Passot, Commandant-Superior	1st Term
11 March 1844 to 17 June 1844	Paul Charles Rang, Commandant-Superior	
17 June 1844 to 22 October 1844	Charles Louis Thiebault, acting Commandant-Superior	
22 October 1844 to January 1846	Auguste Le Brun, acting Commandant-Superior	
January 1846 to August 1849	Pierre Passot, Commandant-Superior	2nd Term
Subordinated to the governors of Réunion
11 August 1849 to 13 June 1851	Stanislas Fortune Livet, Commissioner	
13 June 1851 to 18 October 1853	Philibert Bonfils, Commissioner	
18 October 1853 to 13 December 1854	André Brisset, acting Commissioner	
13 December 1854 to 15 August 1857	Auguste Joseph Verand, Commissioner	
15 August 1857 to 14 August 1860	Charles Auguste Morel, Commissioner	
14 August 1860 to 14 December 1864	Charles Gabrié, Commissioner	
14 December 1864 to 8 July 1868	Joseph Christophe Colomb, Commissioner	1st Term
8 July 1868 to 15 April 1869	Joseph Ferdinand Hayes, acting Commissioner	
15 April 1869 to 21 May 1869	L.J. Leguay, acting Commissioner	
21 May 1869 to 4 March 1871	Joseph Christophe Colomb, Commissioner	2nd Term
4 March 1871 to 19 December 1871	Patrice Louis Ventre de la Touloubre, acting Commissioner	1st Term
19 December 1871 to 1 March 1875	Patrice Louis Ventre de la Touloubre, Commissioner	1st Term
1 March 1875 to 16 September 1875	Claude Fontaine, acting Commissioner	
16 September 1875 to 26 December 1875	François Marie Ferriez, acting Commissioner	
26 December 1875 to 2 January 1878	Patrice Louis Ventre de la Touloubre, Commissioner	2nd Term
2 January 1878 to 9 December 1878	Jean Roblin, acting Commandant	
9 December 1878 to 7 September 1879	Charles Vassal, acting Commandant	
7 September 1879 to 16 December 1879	Charles Bayet, acting Commandant	
16 December 1879 to 31 December 1879	Edouard Sasias, acting Commandant	
31 December 1879 to 3 March 1885	François Marie Ferriez, Commandant	
3 March 1885 to 24 June 1886	Anne Léodor Philotée Metellus Gerville-Réache, Commandant	
Ngazidja (Grande Comore), Ndzuwani (Anjouan), and Mwali (Mohéli) French protectorates
24 June 1886 to August 1887	Anne Léodor Philotée Metellus Gerville-Réache, Commandant	(contd.)
19 August 1887 to 5 September 1887	Paul Louis Maxime Celoron de Blainville, Commandant	
Colony of Mayotte and Dependencies (Colony de Mayotte et Dépendances)
5 September 1887 to 4 May 1888	Paul Celeron de Blainville, Commandant	
4 May 1887 to 1893	Clovis Papinaud, Commandant	1st Term
1893 to 30 March 1896	Etinne Lacascade, Commandant	
30 March 1896 to 5 August 1897	Gentien Pereton, Commandant	
5 August 1897 to 7 March 1899	Louis Micon, Commandant	
7 March 1899 to 18 September 1900	Clovis Papinaud, Commandant	2nd Term
18 September 1900 to 15 October 1902	Pierre Hunert Auguste Pascal, Governor	
15 October 1902 to 28 February 1905	Alfred Albert Martineau, Governor	
28 February 1905 to 3 March 1906	Jean Auguste Gaston Joliet, Governor	
3 March 1906 to 9 April 1908	Fernand Foureau, Governor	
Colony of Mayotte and Dependencies attached to Madagascar
9 April 1908 to 8 September 1908	Fernand Foureau, Governor	(contd.)
8 September 1908 to 1 May 1911	Charles Henri Vergnes, Administrator	
1 May 1911 to 28 September 1911	Frédéric Estèbe, Administrator	
28 September 1911 to 25 July 1912		
25 July 1912	Colony of Mayotte and Dependencies abolished and incorporated into Madagascar	
Province of Comoros	Under Madagascar; ratified 23 February 1914	
25 July 1912 to 21 February 1913	Gabriel Samuel Garnier-Mouton, Administrator	
21 February 1913 to 1914	Honoré Cartron, Administrator	
23 February 1914	de jure subordinated to Madagascar	
24 October 1946 to 27 October 1946	Alain Alaniou, Administrator-superior	
French overseas territory
27 October 1946 to 31 December 1948	Alain Alaniou, Administrator-superior	
31 December 1948 to December 1950	Marie Emmanuel Adolphe Roger Rémy, acting Administrator-superior	
December 1950 to April 1956	Pierre Coudert, Administrator-superior	
April 1956 to 11 February 1958	Georges Victor Maurice Arnaud, acting Administrator-superior	
11 February 1958 to 30 June 1959	Georges Victor Maurice Arnaud, Administrator-superior	
30 June 1959 to 14 December 1960	Gabriel Savignac, acting Administrator-superior	
14 December 1960 to 22 December 1961	Louis Saget, Administrator-superior	
Territory of Comoros	Autonomous	
(Territoire des Comores)
22 December 1961 to 27 February 1962	Louis Saget, Administrator-superior	(contd.)
27 February 1962 to 22 May 1962	Louis Saget, High Commissioner	
22 May 1962 to 15 February 1963	Yves de Daruvar, High Commissioner	
15 February 1963 to 26 July 1966	Henri Joseph Marie Bernard, High Commissioner	
26 July 1966 to November 1969	Antoine Colombani, High Commissioner	
November 1969 to July 1975	Jacques Mouradian, High Commissioner	
6 July 1975	Independence as State of Comoros, and secession of Mayotte	

For continuation after independence, see: List of heads of state of the Comoros

== List of officeholders ==
Dates in italics indicate de facto continuation of office.

Term	Incumbent	Notes
French Suzerainty
Annexed by France (annexation ratified 13 June 1843)
Mayotte Protectorate (subordinated to Île de Bourbon/Réunion)
1841 to 13 June 1843	Pierre Passot, Representative	1st time
Subordinated to the Governors of Île de Bourbon/Réunion
13 June 1843 to 11 March 1844	Pierre Passot, Commandant-Superior	1st time
11 March 1844 to 17 June 1844	Paul Charles Rang, Commandant-Superior	
17 June 1844 to 22 October 1844	Charles Louis Thiebault, acting Commandant-Superior	
22 October 1844 to January 1846	Auguste Le Brun, acting Commandant-Superior	
January 1846 to August 1849	Pierre Passot, Commandant-Superior	2nd time
11 August 1849 to 13 June 1851	Stanislas Fortunat Livet, Commissioner	
13 June 1851 to 18 October 1853	Philibert Bonfils, Commissioner	
18 October 1853 to 13 December 1854	André Brisset, acting Commissioner	
13 December 1854 to 15 August 1857	Auguste Joseph Verand, Commissioner	
15 August 1857 to 14 August 1860	Charles Auguste Morel, Commissioner	
14 August 1860 to 14 December 1864	Charles Gabrié, Commissioner	
14 December 1864 to 8 July 1868	Joseph Vincent Christophe Colomb, Commissioner	1st time
8 July 1868 to 15 April 1869	Joseph Ferdinand Hayes, acting Commissioner	
15 April 1869 to 21 May 1869	L.J. Leguay, acting Commissioner	
21 May 1869 to 4 March 1871	Joseph Vincent Christophe Colomb, Commissioner	2nd time
4 March 1871 to 1 March 1875	Patrice Louis Jules Ventre de la Touloubre, Commissioner	Acting to 19 December 1871, 1st time
1 March 1875 to 16 September 1875	Claude Fontaine, acting Commissioner	
16 September 1875 to 26 December 1875	François Marie Ferriez, acting Commissioner	1st time
26 December 1875 to 2 January 1878	Patrice Louis Jules Ventre de la Touloubre, Commissioner	2nd time
2 January 1878 to 9 December 1878	Jean Roblin, acting Commandant	
9 December 1878 to 7 September 1879	Charles Vassal, acting Commandant	
7 September 1879 to 16 December 1879	Charles Bayet, acting Commandant	
16 December 1879 to 31 December 1879	Edouard Sasias, acting Commandant	
31 December 1879 to 3 March 1885	François Marie Ferriez, Commandant	2nd time
3 March 1885 to August 1887	Anne Léodor Philotée Metellus Gerville-Réache, Commandant	
19 August 1887 to 5 September 1887	Paul Louis Maxime Celoron de Blainville, Commandant	
5 September 1887 to 1888	Paul Louis Maxime Celoron de Blainville, Governor	
4 May 1888 to 1893	Pierre Louis Clovis Papinaud, Governor	1st time
25 April 1893 to 30 March 1896	Étienne Théodore Lacascade, Governor	
Mayotte Protectorate (Subordinated to Madagascar)
Subordinated to the Governors-General of Madagascar
30 March 1896 to 1897	Auguste Pereton, acting Administrator-Superior	
5 August 1897 to 11 March 1899	Louis Alexandre Antoine Mizon, Administrator-Superior	
March 1899 to 8 July 1900	Pierre Louis Clovis Papinaud, Governor	2nd time
18 September 1900 to 1902	Pierre Hubert Auguste Pascal, Governor	
1902	Louis Lemaire, acting Governor	
15 October 1902 to May 1904	Alfred Albert Martineau, Governor	
1 June 1904 to 1905	Jules Martin, acting Governor	
1905 to 1906	Jean Auguste Gaston Joliet, Governor	
3 March 1906 to 1907	Fernand Foureau, Governor	
26 December 1907 to 1908	Paul Patté, acting Governor	
8 September 1908 to 1909	Charles Henri Vergnes, Administrator	
31 March 1909 to 1910	Ernest Bonneval, Administrator	
24 February 1910 to 1911	Michel Astor, Administrator	
1 May 1911 to 28 September 1911	Frédéric Estèbe, Administrator	
28 September 1911 to 25 July 1912	Gabriel Samuel Garnier-Mouton, Administrator	
25 July 1912 to 21 July 1975	Part of the Comoros	
Separate colony
21 July 1975 to 1976	Younoussa Bamana, Prefect	Proclaimed by pro-French demonstrators
23 June 1976 to 24 December 1976	Jean Marie Coussirou, Prefect	
French collectivité territoriale (reaffirmed 22 December 1979)
24 December 1976 to 30 April 1978	Jean Marie Coussirou, Prefect	
30 April 1978 to 15 April 1980	Jean Maurice Marie Rigotard, Prefect	
15 April 1980 to 24 January 1981	Philippe Jacques Nicolas Kessler, Prefect	
24 January 1981 to 25 January 1982	Pierre Sevellec, Prefect	
25 January 1982 to 10 May 1982	Yves Bonnet, Prefect	
10 May 1982 to 25 November 1982	Yves Bonnet, Commissioner of the Republic	
5 January 1983 to 1984	Christian Pellerin, Commissioner of the Republic	
1984 to 1986	François Bonnelle, Commissioner of the Republic	
1986	Guy Dupuis, Commissioner of the Republic	
1986 to 24 February 1988	Akli Khider, Commissioner of the Republic	
24 February 1988 to 23 November 1988	Akli Khider, Prefect	
23 November 1988 to 17 October 1990	Daniel Limodin, Prefect	
17 October 1990 to 24 February 1993	Jean-Paul Coste, Prefect	
9 March 1993 to 17 January 1994	Jean-Jacques Debacq, Prefect	
17 January 1994 to 20 February 1996	Alain Weil, Prefect	
20 February 1996 to 15 July 1998	Philippe Boisadam, Prefect	
31 August 1998 to 8 October 2001	Pierre Bayle, Prefect	
8 October 2001 to 4 July 2002	Philippe de Mester, Prefect	
4 July 2002 to 28 March 2003	Jean-Jacques Brot, Prefect	
French overseas collectivité (with the designation collectivité départementale)
28 March 2003 to 17 January 2005	Jean-Jacques Brot, Prefect	
17 January 2005 to 1 February 2007	Jean-Paul Kihl, Prefect	
1 February 2007 to September 2008	Vincent Bouvier, Prefect	
12 September 2008 to 13 July 2009	Denis Robin, Prefect	
13 July 2009 to 17 August 2009	Christophe Peyrel, acting Prefect	
17 August 2009 to 4 July 2011	Hubert Derache, Prefect	
French overseas department
4 July 2011 to 21 July 2011	Patrick Duprat, acting Prefect	
21 July 2011 to 30 January 2013	Thomas Degos, Prefect	
30 January 2013 to 30 July 2014	Jacques Witkowski, Prefect	
31 July 2014 to 5 May 2016	Seymour Morsy, Prefect	
6 May 2016 to 27 March 2018	Frédéric Veau, Prefect	
28 March 2018 to 9 July 2019	Dominique Sorain, Prefect	
10 July 2019 to 23 June 2021	Jean-François Colombet, Prefect	
23 June 2021 to 14 February 2024	Thierry Suquet, Prefect	
14 February 2024 to present	François-Xavier Bieuville, Prefect	

== See also ==
- List of sultans in the Comoros
- List of Sunni dynasties
- Lists of office-holders
