= 2026 in the Comoros =

- Decades: 2000s; 2010s; 2020s
- See also: Other events of 2026; List of years in Comoros

Events in the year 2026 in the Comoros.

== Incumbents ==
- President: Azali Assoumani
- President of the Assembly: Moustadroine Abdou

== Events ==
- 19 March – Seventeen bodies are recovered from a boat that washed ashore in the Comoros. The bodies are believed to be those of migrants from Madagascar and Mozambique.
- 9 May – The government introduces fuel price increases in response to rising global oil prices linked to the 2026 Iran war, raising diesel prices by 46% and gasoline prices by 35%.
- 16 May – President Assoumani suspends the fuel price hikes implemented on 9 May pending further talks, following nationwide protests and deadly unrest.
- 25 July – Six towns associated with the sultanate era are designated as UNESCO World Heritage Sites.

== Holidays ==
- 1 January – New Year's Day
- 27 January – Leilat al-Meiraj
- 18 March – Cheikh Al Maarouf Day
- 20 March – Eid al-Fitr
- 20 March – March – Eid al-Fitr Holiday
- 1 May – Labour Day
- 27 May – Eid al-Adha
- 26 June – Mouharam
- 6 July – National Day
- 4 September – Mouloud
- 12 November – Maore Day
