= Nourdine Bourhane =

Vice President of the Comoros

Nourdine Bourhane (born in 1950 in Mamoudzou, Mayotte) is a politician from the Comoros and one of the Vice Presidents of the Comoros from May 2011 to May 2016. Previously, Bourhane served as prime minister of Comoros from December 1997 to May 1998.

He has also served as minister of several cabinet departments between 1990 and 1998, including health, posts and telecommunications, youth and sports, economy and planning.

Political offices
Preceded by Ahmed Abdou	Prime Minister of the Comoros; 1997-1998	Succeeded by Vacant
Preceded by Idi Nadhoim; Ikililou Dhoinine	Vice President of the Comoros; 2011-2016; Served alongside: Fouad Mohadji; Mohamed Ali Soilih	Succeeded by Abdallah Said Sarouma; Djaffar Ahmed Said; Moustadroine Abdou
