= 2025 in the Comoros =

- Decades: 2000s; 2010s; 2020s
- See also: Other events of 2025; List of years in Comoros

Events in the year 2025 in the Comoros.

== Incumbents ==
- President: Azali Assoumani
- President of the Assembly: Moustadroine Abdou

== Events ==
- 12 January – 2025 Comorian parliamentary election: The ruling Convention for the Renewal of the Comoros retains a majority in the Assembly of the Union after winning 28 out of 33 seats.
- 18 March – Comoros Becomes the 44th Member of the Africa Finance Corporation.
- 25 March – The government secures a €40-million Energy Deal with the International Islamic Trade Finance Corporation.
- 28 March – Russia announces plans to open an Embassy in Moroni.
- 13 May – At least six people die as two migrant boats capsize along the Anjouan-Mayotte corridor while attempting to reach Mayotte.

== Holidays ==
- 1 January – New Year's Day
- 27 January – Leilat al-Meiraj
- 18 March – Cheikh Al Maarouf Day
- 30 March – Eid al-Fitr
- 31 March – 1 April – Eid al-Fitr Holiday
- 1 May – Labour Day
- 6 June – Eid al-Adha
- 7 June – Eid al-Adha Holiday
- 26 June – Mouharam
- 6 July – National Day
- 4 September – Mouloud
- 12 November – Maore Day
