= 2019 in the Comoros =

- Decades: 1990s; 2000s; 2010s; 2020s
- See also: Other events of 2019; List of years in Comoros

Events in the year 2019 in the Comoros.

== Incumbents ==
- President: Azali Assoumani

== Events ==
- 24 March – 2019 Comorian presidential election: President Azali Assoumani was re-elected in the first round of voting.
- 21 April – Cyclone Kenneth causes several deaths in the Comoros.

== Sports ==
- 2019 Comoros Premier League

== See also ==
- List of years in Comoros
