= List of colonial governors of the Comoros =

This article lists the colonial governors of the Comoros, from the establishment of the French suzerainty over the Comoro Islands in 1841 until the independence of the Comoros in 1975.

== List of officeholders ==
(Dates in italics indicate de facto continuation of office)

Tenure	Incumbent	Notes
French Suzerainty
25 March 1841	Annexed by France; ratified 13 June 1843	
Colony of Mayotte
1841 to June 1843	Pierre Passot, French Representative	
Subordinated to the governors of Île de Bourbon/Réunion
June 1843 to 11 March 1844	Pierre Passot, Commandant-Superior	1st Term
11 March 1844 to 17 June 1844	Paul Charles Rang, Commandant-Superior	
17 June 1844 to 22 October 1844	Charles Louis Thiebault, acting Commandant-Superior	
22 October 1844 to January 1846	Auguste Le Brun, acting Commandant-Superior	
January 1846 to August 1849	Pierre Passot, Commandant-Superior	2nd Term
Subordinated to the governors of Réunion
11 August 1849 to 13 June 1851	Stanislas Fortune Livet, Commissioner	
13 June 1851 to 18 October 1853	Philibert Bonfils, Commissioner	
18 October 1853 to 13 December 1854	André Brisset, acting Commissioner	
13 December 1854 to 15 August 1857	Auguste Joseph Verand, Commissioner	
15 August 1857 to 14 August 1860	Charles Auguste Morel, Commissioner	
14 August 1860 to 14 December 1864	Charles Gabrié, Commissioner	
14 December 1864 to 8 July 1868	Joseph Christophe Colomb, Commissioner	1st Term
8 July 1868 to 15 April 1869	Joseph Ferdinand Hayes, acting Commissioner	
15 April 1869 to 21 May 1869	L.J. Leguay, acting Commissioner	
21 May 1869 to 4 March 1871	Joseph Christophe Colomb, Commissioner	2nd Term
4 March 1871 to 19 December 1871	Patrice Louis Ventre de la Touloubre, acting Commissioner	1st Term
19 December 1871 to 1 March 1875	Patrice Louis Ventre de la Touloubre, Commissioner	1st Term
1 March 1875 to 16 September 1875	Claude Fontaine, acting Commissioner	
16 September 1875 to 26 December 1875	François Marie Ferriez, acting Commissioner	
26 December 1875 to 2 January 1878	Patrice Louis Ventre de la Touloubre, Commissioner	2nd Term
2 January 1878 to 9 December 1878	Jean Roblin, acting Commandant	
9 December 1878 to 7 September 1879	Charles Vassal, acting Commandant	
7 September 1879 to 16 December 1879	Charles Bayet, acting Commandant	
16 December 1879 to 31 December 1879	Edouard Sasias, acting Commandant	
31 December 1879 to 3 March 1885	François Marie Ferriez, Commandant	
3 March 1885 to 24 June 1886	Anne Léodor Philotée Metellus Gerville-Réache, Commandant	
Ngazidja (Grande Comore), Ndzuwani (Anjouan), and Mwali (Mohéli) French protectorates
24 June 1886 to August 1887	Anne Léodor Philotée Metellus Gerville-Réache, Commandant	(contd.)
19 August 1887 to 5 September 1887	Paul Louis Maxime Celoron de Blainville, Commandant	
Colony of Mayotte and Dependencies (Colony de Mayotte et Dépendances)
5 September 1887 to 4 May 1888	Paul Celeron de Blainville, Commandant	
4 May 1887 to 1893	Clovis Papinaud, Commandant	1st Term
1893 to 30 March 1896	Etinne Lacascade, Commandant	
30 March 1896 to 5 August 1897	Gentien Pereton, Commandant	
5 August 1897 to 7 March 1899	Louis Micon, Commandant	
7 March 1899 to 18 September 1900	Clovis Papinaud, Commandant	2nd Term
18 September 1900 to 15 October 1902	Pierre Hunert Auguste Pascal, Governor	
15 October 1902 to 28 February 1905	Alfred Albert Martineau, Governor	
28 February 1905 to 3 March 1906	Jean Auguste Gaston Joliet, Governor	
3 March 1906 to 9 April 1908	Fernand Foureau, Governor	
Colony of Mayotte and Dependencies attached to Madagascar
9 April 1908 to 8 September 1908	Fernand Foureau, Governor	(contd.)
8 September 1908 to 1 May 1911	Charles Henri Vergnes, Administrator	
1 May 1911 to 28 September 1911	Frédéric Estèbe, Administrator	
28 September 1911 to 25 July 1912		
25 July 1912	Colony of Mayotte and Dependencies abolished and incorporated into Madagascar	
Province of Comoros	Under Madagascar; ratified 23 February 1914	
25 July 1912 to 21 February 1913	Gabriel Samuel Garnier-Mouton, Administrator	
21 February 1913 to 1914	Honoré Cartron, Administrator	
23 February 1914	de jure subordinated to Madagascar	
24 October 1946 to 27 October 1946	Alain Alaniou, Administrator-superior	
French overseas territory
27 October 1946 to 31 December 1948	Alain Alaniou, Administrator-superior	
31 December 1948 to December 1950	Marie Emmanuel Adolphe Roger Rémy, acting Administrator-superior	
December 1950 to April 1956	Pierre Coudert, Administrator-superior	
April 1956 to 11 February 1958	Georges Victor Maurice Arnaud, acting Administrator-superior	
11 February 1958 to 30 June 1959	Georges Victor Maurice Arnaud, Administrator-superior	
30 June 1959 to 14 December 1960	Gabriel Savignac, acting Administrator-superior	
14 December 1960 to 22 December 1961	Louis Saget, Administrator-superior	
Territory of Comoros	Autonomous	
(Territoire des Comores)
22 December 1961 to 27 February 1962	Louis Saget, Administrator-superior	(contd.)
27 February 1962 to 22 May 1962	Louis Saget, High Commissioner	
22 May 1962 to 15 February 1963	Yves de Daruvar, High Commissioner	
15 February 1963 to 26 July 1966	Henri Joseph Marie Bernard, High Commissioner	
26 July 1966 to November 1969	Antoine Colombani, High Commissioner	
November 1969 to July 1975	Jacques Mouradian, High Commissioner	
6 July 1975	Independence as State of Comoros, and secession of Mayotte	

For continuation after independence, see: List of heads of state of the Comoros

== See also ==
- History of the Comoros
- Politics of the Comoros
- List of sultans in the Comoros
- List of heads of state of the Comoros
- Vice-President of the Comoros
- List of prime ministers of the Comoros
- List of colonial and departmental heads of Mayotte
