= 2010 Comorian presidential election =

Election of Ikililou Dhoinine

- 7 November 2010 (Mohéli primary); 26 December 2010 (national vote)
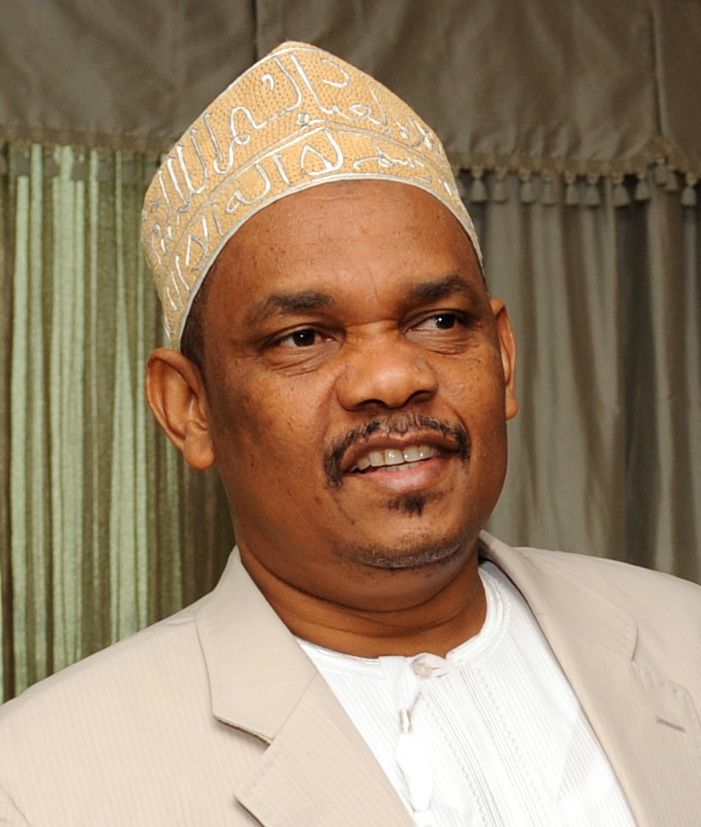

Nominee	Ikililou Dhoinine	Mohamed Said Fazul	Abdou Djabir
Popular vote	106,890	57,587	11,018
Percentage	60.91%	32.81%	6.28%
President before election
Ahmed Abdallah Mohamed Sambi
Elected President
Ikililou Dhoinine

Presidential elections were held in the Comoros on 7 November 2010, with a second round on 26 December, alongside gubernatorial elections for the three main islands. The result was a victory for Ikililou Dhoinine, who received 61% of the vote.

== Background ==
There had been an attempt to delay the elections until 27 November 2011 and extend the presidential term until then. However, the Constitutional Court ruled this unconstitutional in May 2010.

== Electoral system ==
In Comoros, the presidency rotates every four years between the federation's three constituent islands: Anjouan, Mohéli and Grande Comore. This rotation was Mohéli's turn to supply the president. Incumbent president Ahmed Abdallah Sambi was from Anjouan, and was thus not able to stand as a candidate.

The president was elected in two rounds; in the first round, voters in Mohéli voted in a primary election, with the top three candidates advancing to the second round, where a nationwide vote was carried out, with the winner decided by plurality voting.

== Candidates ==
There were ten candidates in the presidential primary election. President Sambi supported his Vice President Ikililou Dhoinine. Another candidate from the Presidential Movement was Mohamed Larifou Oukacha, secretary-general of the presidency, showing a possible split in the Presidential faction. The other eight candidates were from the opposition. Among them were Mohamed Said Fazul, former governor of Mohéli, and Zahariat Saïd Ahmed, the sole female candidate.

== Results ==
Ikililou Dhoinine, Mohamed Said Fazul and Bianrifi Tarmidhi received the most votes in the first round primary. However, Tarmidhi's total number of votes was cut down on 13 November by the constitutional court after it had decided to invalidate the ballots from several polling stations. This meant that, besides Dhoinine and Fazul, Abdou Djabir advanced to the second round.

Candidate	Mohéli primary		National vote	
Candidate	Votes	%	Votes	%
Ikililou Dhoinine	3,785	28.19	106,890	60.91
Mohamed Said Fazul	3,080	22.94	57,587	32.81
Abdou Djabir	1,327	9.88	11,018	6.28
Bianrifi Tarmidi	1,250	9.31		
Saïd Dhoifir Bounou	1,154	8.59		
Hamada Madi Bolero	1,060	7.89		
Mohamed Larifou Oukacha	977	7.28		
Mohamed Hassanaly	523	3.90		
Abdoulhakim Ben Allaoui	208	1.55		
Zahariat Saïd Ahmed	63	0.47		
Total	13,427	100.00	175,495	100.00
Valid votes	13,427	93.39	175,495	86.48
Invalid/blank votes	951	6.61	27,438	13.52
Total votes	14,378	100.00	202,933	100.00
Registered voters/turnout	21,429	67.10	384,358	52.80
Source: African Elections Database
