= Mohéli National Park =

National park in the Comoros

- Hifadhi ya Taifa ya Mwali
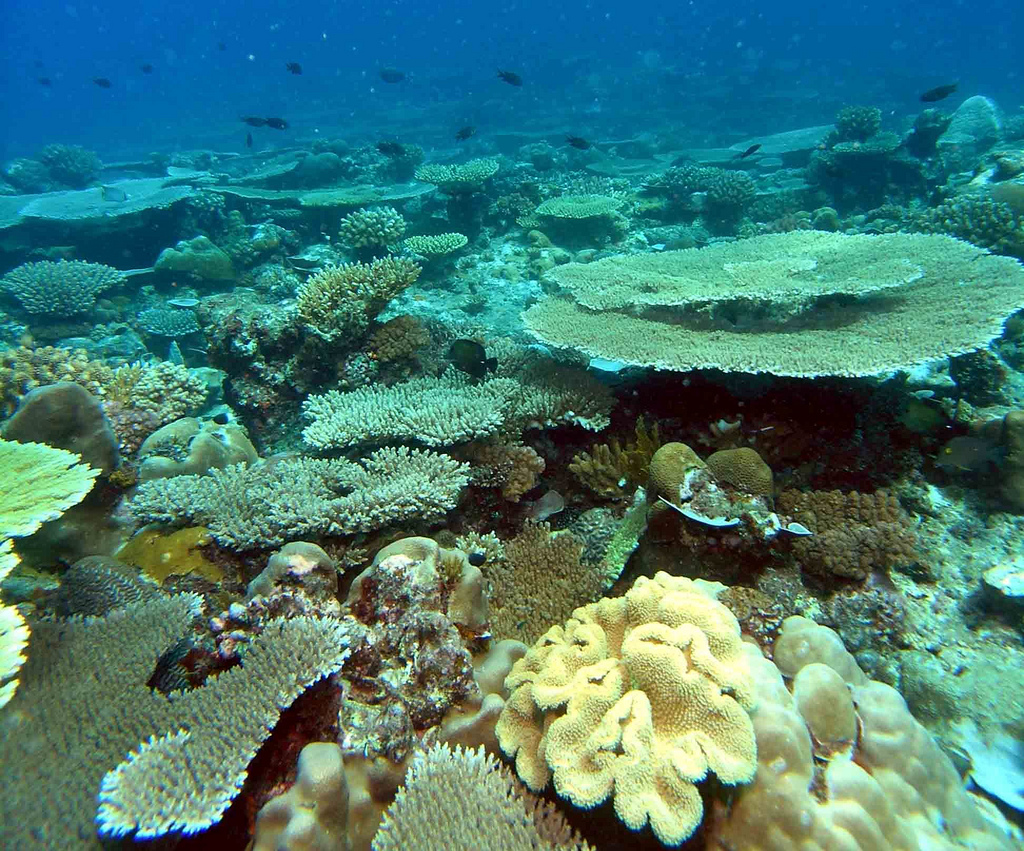
- reef corals in Moheli National Park
- Interactive map of Mohéli National Park
- Location: Mohéli, Comoros
- Coordinates: 12°10′S 43°46′E(kolossus-frwiki)
- Area: 64,362 ha (248.50 sq mi)
- Designation: 2001 marine national park; 2010 national park
- Operator: The Comoros National Parks Agency

Ramsar Wetland
- Official name: Lake Dziani Boundouni
- Designated: 9 February 1995
- Reference no.: 717

Mohéli National Park is a national park in the Comoros. It includes marine, coastal, and terrestrial areas on and around the island of Mohéli. The park has an area of 643.62 km^{2}. Established as Mohéli Marine Park on 19 April 2001, it was first protected area in the Comoros. It was redesignated a national park in 2010. In 2015 the park was expanded to include about three-quarters of Mohéli's terrestrial area. It is the southernmost territory of the southernmost Arabic-speaking country.

== Marine ==
The marine portion of the park extends from the southern and eastern shores of the island. It includes a fringing reef some distance from the shore, which encloses a lagoon 10 to 60 meters deep, along with eight small mountainous islets, along with the open ocean beyond the reef to a depth of 100 meters. There are 91 ha of mangroves along the shore of the island, and seagrass beds in the lagoon.

A notable feature of the park is the population of coelacanths, the park is home to varieties of sharks and humpback whales. Other marine species include the dugong (Dugong dugon), green sea turtle (Chelonia mydas), hawksbill turtle (Eretmochelys imbricata), eight species of dolphins, and two species of bottlenose whales.

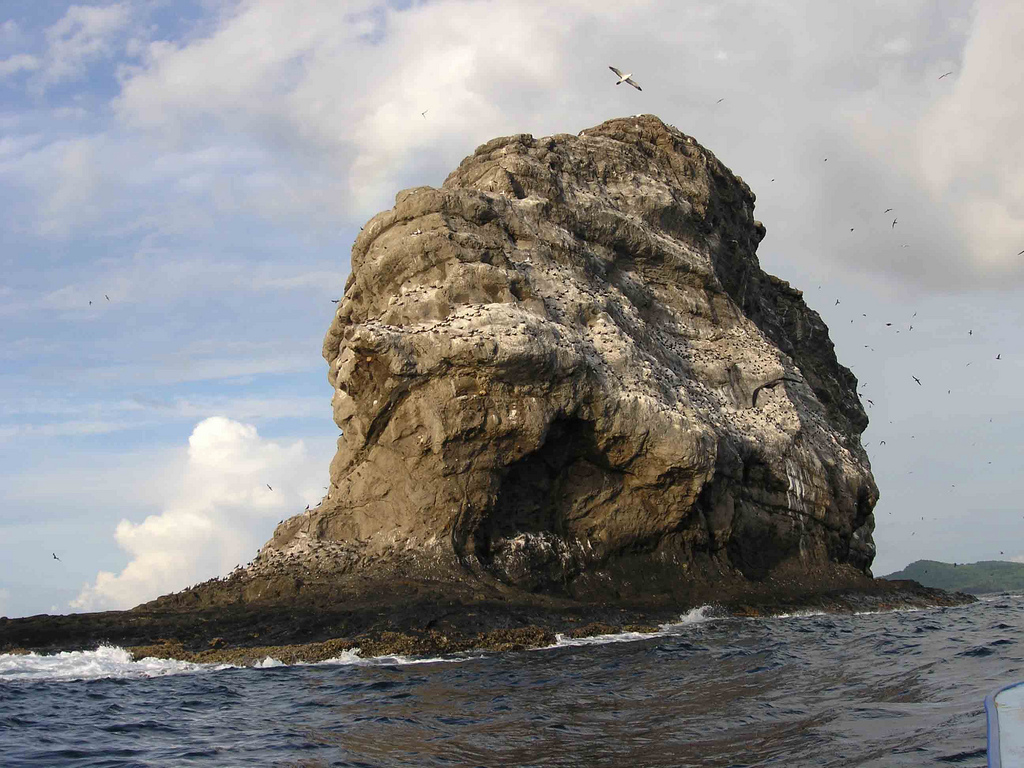
Seabirds on Mchaco Islet in Mohéli National Park

The islets are breeding colonies for seabirds, including the masked booby (Sula dactylatra), brown noddy (Anous stolidus), white-tailed tropicbird (Phaethon lepturus), lesser frigatebird (Fregata ariel), and great frigatebird (Fregata minor).

== Terrestrial ==
The terrestrial portion of the park has rugged terrain, with deep stream valleys separated by ridges. The highest point is Mont Mlédjélé (790 m). Most of the island was once forested, but most of the forest was cleared for agriculture or livestock raising, or degraded by activities like timber harvesting. A large enclave of relatively intact forest remains on the west and south-facing slopes of Mount Mlédjélé. The forest is home to the native trees Pterophylla comorensis and Khaya madagascariensis, which are valued for their timber, and many other species of trees, shrubs, ferns, and orchids, including many Comorian endemic species. Native animals include Livingstone's fruit bat (Pteropus livingstonii), which lives only on Mohéli and Anjouan, the Moheli scops owl (Otus moheliensis) and Moheli brush warbler (Nesillas mariae), which are endemic to Mohéli, and other species of birds, reptiles, and insects endemic to the Comoro Islands.

== Freshwater ==
The park also includes Lake Dziani-Boudouni, a freshwater crater lake in the island's southern lowlands. The lake covers an area of 30 ha, and may be linked to subterranean volcanic vents. It supports a diverse population of birds.
