= Said Ali Kemal =

Comorian politician (1938–2020)

Ambassador of the Comoros to France
- In office 30 November 1978 – 25 September 1980

Minister of the Economy and Commerce
- In office 1 March 1990 – 1 September 1990

Interim President of the Comoros
- In office 2 October 1995 – 5 October 1995
- Preceded by: Combo Ayouba
- Succeeded by: Caabi El-Yachroutu Mohamed

Member of the Assembly of the Union of the Comoros
- In office 4 June 2004 – 13 January 2010

Personal details
- Born: 1938 Moroni, French Madagascar
- Died: 13 September 2020 (aged 81–82) Moroni, Comoros

Said Ali Kemal (1938 – 13 September 2020) was a Comorian politician. He was the son of Prince Saïd Ibrahim Ben Ali and the grandson of Sultan Said Ali bin Said Omar of Grande Comore.

== Biography ==
Kemal did his Quranic studies in the Comoros, then attended university in Madagascar and France, where he graduated from the École nationale de la France d'Outre-Mer and the Institute of Human and Social Sciences. After studying journalism, he began working for the Office de Radiodiffusion Télévision Française in the Comoros in 1969.

Working as a journalist in the Comoros, Réunion, Djibouti, and France, Kemal was one of the first Africans to present news on a French television channel. In Djibouti, his job was to cover the conflict between the Afars and the Issas. He was one of the founding members of the Association des Stagiaires et Étudiants comoriens (ASEC) in France. He served as President of the association, which aimed to promote Comorian culture and obtain scholarships for Comorian students, from 1966 to 1969.

In 1978, Ahmed Abdallah, President of the Comoros, asked Kemal to become the first Ambassador of the Comoros to France based on his Francophilia and personal qualities. Abdallah believed that Kemal was the best candidate to repair Comorian and French relations, which had been in disrepair since the Comoros's independence. Two years later, Kemal resigned out of frustration of the dictatorial tendencies of leadership in his home country.

Following Abdallah's death, Kemal was a candidate for the Presidential elections. He came in third place with 13.74% of the vote behind Mohamed Taki Abdoulkarim and Said Mohamed Djohar. He briefly took part in Djohar's government, but soon resigned out of disagreement with leadership.

Following the coup d'état of President Djohar, the Comorian Army seized power and asked Kemal and Taki to act as executive leaders of the country. He served as Interim President of the Comoros for three days, from 2 October to 5 October 1995 before a French Armed Forces intervention. President Taki then attempted to form a bipartisan constitution, and Kemal as the Minister of Finance, but Kemal once again left government following a disagreement.

Following a separatist crisis in Anjouan in 1997, Kemal called for national unity and respect for territorial integrity, condemning the military landing on the island by President Taki. Taki's sudden death worsened the crisis, which Colonel Azali Assoumani was unable to mitigate.

Kemal was a strong critic of constitutional solutions that would lead to the Balkanization of the Comoros. He proposed the formation of a constituent assembly and changes to the 1978 constitution, allowing the islands to gain more autonomy.

In 2004, Kemal was elected to the Assembly of the Union of the Comoros, representing the Constituency of Bambao with 64% of the vote. In 2009, he opposed President Ahmed Abdallah Mohamed Sambi's retention of the office and demanded the next president come from the island of Mohéli. In 2011, a consensus was reached and Ikililou Dhoinine, from Mohéli, became president. However, Kemal, with his party, Shuma, denounced President Dhoinine's authoritarian and business-like abuses of power, particularly his tendencies of nepotism.

Withdrawn from political life, Said Ali Kemal died on 13 September 2020 in Moroni and was buried next to his father in Iconi the same day.

== Distinctions ==
- Grand Master of the L'Etoile de la Grande Comore
- Grand Officer of the Legion of Honour
