= Kafe =

Kafe may refer to:

- KAFE, a US radio station
- Kafe, a town in Ituri Province, Democratic Republic of the Congo
- Kafe District, Abuja, Nigeria

== People with the name ==
- Said Kafe (1937–2002), Comorian politician
