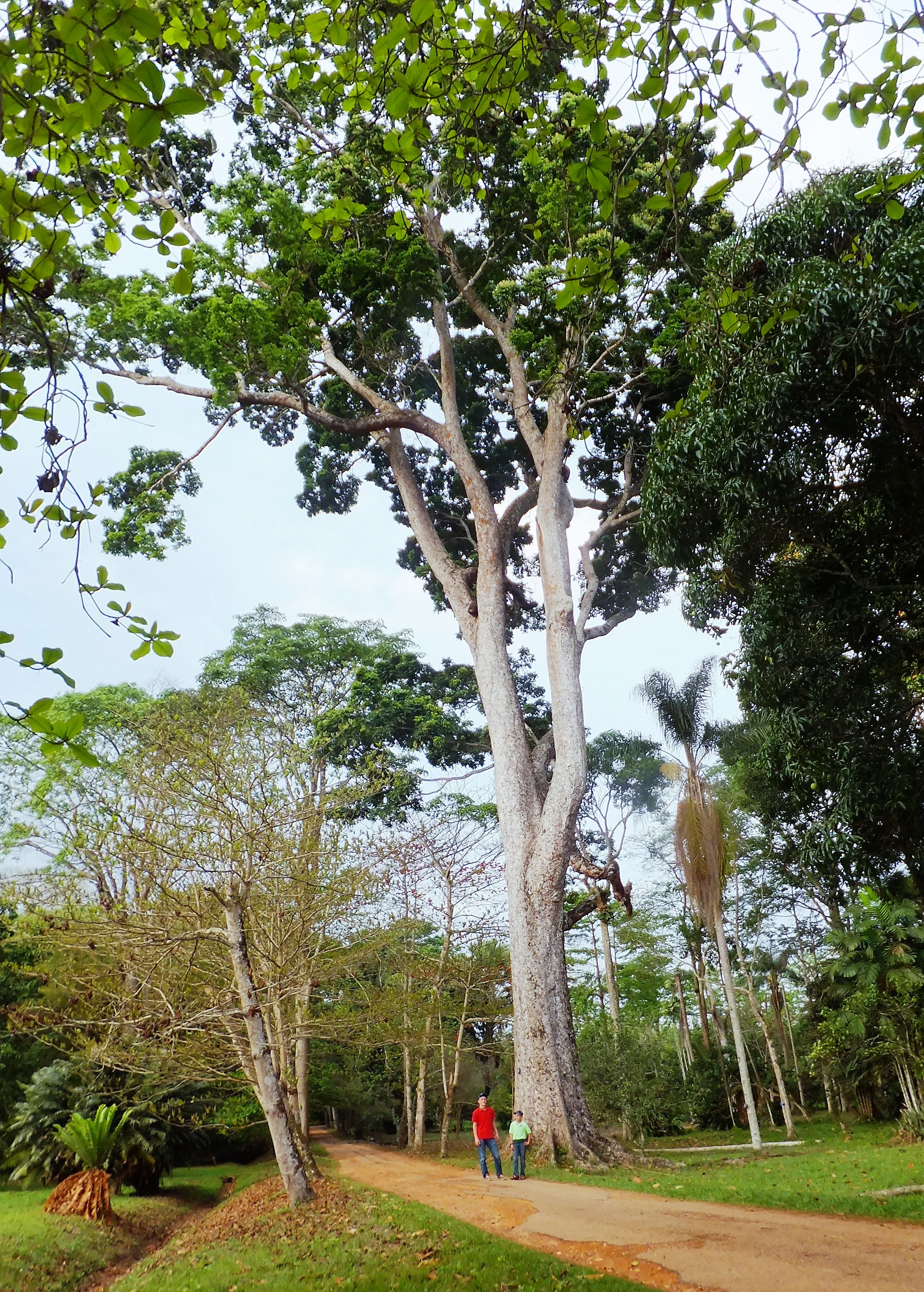

Conservation status
- Vulnerable (IUCN 2.3)

Scientific classification
- Kingdom: Plantae
- Clade: Embryophytes
- Clade: Tracheophytes
- Clade: Spermatophytes
- Clade: Angiosperms
- Clade: Eudicots
- Clade: Rosids
- Order: Sapindales
- Family: Meliaceae
- Genus: Khaya
- Species: K. ivorensis

Binomial name
- Khaya ivorensis A.Chev.

Synonyms
- Khaya caudata Stapf ex Hutch. & Dalziel; Khaya klainei Pierre ex Pellegr.

= Khaya ivorensis =

Species of tree found in Africa

Khaya ivorensis, also called African mahogany or Lagos mahogany, is a tall forest tree with a buttressed trunk in the family Meliaceae. It is found in Angola, Cameroon, Côte d'Ivoire, Gabon, Ghana, Liberia, and Nigeria where it grows primarily in lowland tropical rainforests. It is threatened by habitat loss.

Khaya ivorensis is a species in the African mahogany family. Other common names are Gold Coast mahogany, Ivory Coast mahogany, Nigerian mahogany. It grows to be about 40–50 m high. It has thick and reddish brown bark. It grows many white flowers at the end of its branches. Its woody fruit is slightly thinner than those of Khaya grandifoliola.

== Distribution and habitat ==
Khaya ivorensis typically grows in drier climates. It can be found in lowland rainforest that have a short dry season. It grows in groups or singly. It does not have many demands to survive because it can tolerate some shade and short periods of flood during rainy seasons. It is mostly found in West Africa and southern Nigeria.

== Uses ==
Its wood is durable and is used to make many things such as furniture and paneling. The tree's bark is bitter and can be used as a natural remedy for coughs and whooping cough. Some find that when mixed with black peppercorns it can be used to treat diarrhea and dysentery. A bark concoction is used as a drink or bath for back pains and as a lotion for rheumatism. Planting the tree improves and enriches the soil, so many people use the tree for that as well.
