= ITFC =

ITFC may refer to:

- Inspired Talents F.C., a football club in Londonderry, Northern Ireland
- International Islamic Trade Finance Corporation, a finance company in Saudi Arabia
- Ipswich Town F.C., a football club in England, United Kingdom
