= Ikililou Dhoinine =

Comorian politician

- إكليل ظنين
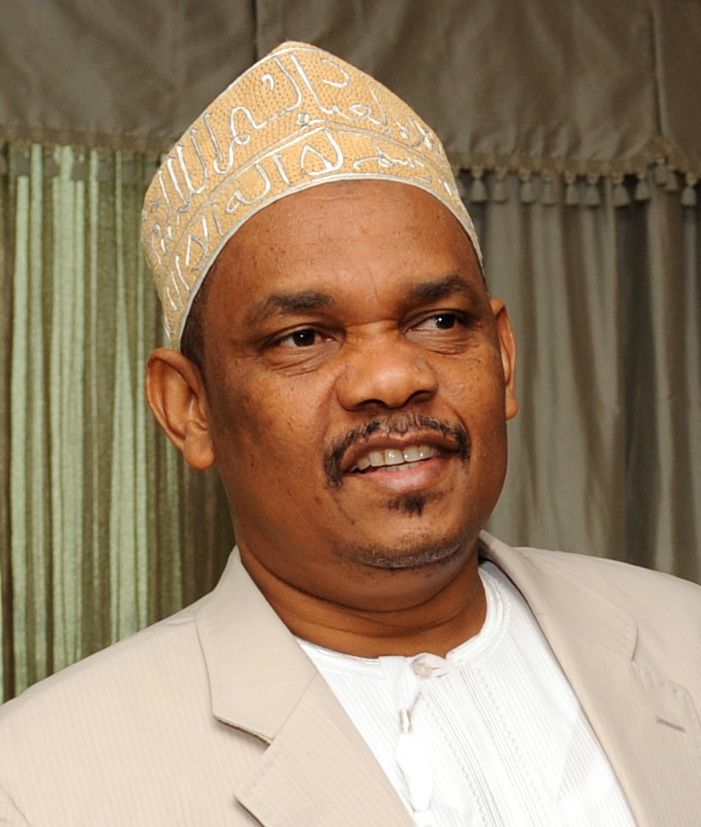
- Dhoinine in 2012

9th President of the Comoros
- In office 26 May 2011 – 26 May 2016
- Vice President: Fouad Mohadji; Mohamed Ali Soilih; Nourdine Bourhane
- Preceded by: Ahmed Abdallah Mohamed; Sambi
- Succeeded by: Azali Assoumani

Vice President of the Comoros
- In office 2006–2011 Serving with Idi Nadhoim
- President: Ahmed Abdallah Mohamed Sambi
- Preceded by: Caabi El-Yachroutu Mohamed; Rachidi ben Massonde
- Succeeded by: Fouad Mohadji; Mohamed Ali Soilih; Nourdine Bourhane

Personal details
- Born: 14 August 1962 (age 63) Djoièzi, Mohéli, Comoros
- Party: Baobab Movement
- Spouse: Hadidja Abubacarr

Ikililou Dhoinine (Arabic: إكليل ظنين, born 14 August 1962) is a Comorian politician who served as the ninth President of the Comoros from 2011 to 2016; he was Vice-President of the Comoros from 2006 to 2011.

== Political career ==
Dhoinine won the 2010 Comorian presidential election, in which he received the most votes in the first round (28.19%). He faced Mohamed Said Fazul and Abdou Djabir in a run-off election and received 61.12% to win the Presidency. A member of the ruling party, Dhoinine was supported in the election by incumbent President Ahmed Abdallah Mohamed Sambi. Previously, he had worked in the Ministry of Finance as the Vice-President in charge of Budget and Women's Entrepreneurship. From 26 March to 31 March 2008, he was the provisional President of Anjouan, an island in the Comoros.

Dhoinine, a pharmacist by training, is the first President of Comoros from the island of Mohéli.

Dhoinine served for five years as Vice President to outgoing president Ahmed Abdallah Mohamed Sambi. He was also temporarily President of Anjouan in March 2008. He was briefly Minister of Finance from June 2009 to June 2010.

At his inauguration Dhoinine pledged to "stop at nothing in the fight against corruption". He initiated the National Commission for the Prevention and Fight Against Corruption and the Regulatory Authority for Public Procurement to increase transparency.

In 2013, Dhoinine was subject of a failed coup d'état due to discontent over the dismissal of several government officials.

Dhoinine's wife is Hadidja Abubacarr I'Dhoinine.

Political offices
| Preceded by Caabi El-Yachroutu Mohamed; Rachidi ben Massonde | Vice President of the Comoros; 2006–2011; Served alongside: Idi Nadhoim | Succeeded by Fouad Mohadji; Mohamed Ali Soilih; Nourdine Bourhane |
| Preceded by Ahmed Abdallah Mohamed Sambi | President of the Comoros; 2011–2016 | Succeeded by Azali Assoumani |
