= Vice-President of the Comoros =

The vice-president of the Comoros was a political position in the Comoros. Vice-presidents are appointed by the president. From 2002 to 2011, the presidency and the positions of the two vice-presidents were rotated between the three Comoro Islands – Grande Comore, Anjouan and Mohéli. From 2011 to 2019, there were three vice-presidents, one from each of the islands in the Union of the Comoros. The positions of vice-presidents were abolished as part of the implementation of constitutional referendum held in 2018 in May 2019, instead designating a "main minister" and the governors of the islands as successors to become acting president.

== List of officeholders ==
Portrait	Name	Took office	Left office	Representing	President	Ref
State of the Comoros (1976–1978)
	Mohamed Hassanaly	January 1976	13 May 1978 (Note: Deposed in a coup d'état.)	Mohéli	Ali Soilih	
Union of the Comoros (2002–2019)
	Caabi El-Yachroutu Mohamed	26 May 2002	26 May 2006	Anjouan	Azali Assoumani (Note: Representing Grande Comore.)	
	Rachid ben Massoundi	26 May 2002	26 May 2006	Mohéli	Azali Assoumani	
	Ikililou Dhoinine	26 May 2006	26 May 2011	Mohéli	Ahmed Abdallah Mohamed Sambi (Note: Representing Anjouan.)	
	Idi Nadhoim	26 May 2006	26 May 2011	Grande Comore	Ahmed Abdallah Mohamed Sambi	
	Fouad Mohadji	26 May 2011	26 May 2016	Mohéli	Ikililou Dhoinine (Note: Representing Mohéli.)	
	Mohamed Ali Soilihi	26 May 2011	26 May 2016	Grande Comore	Ikililou Dhoinine	
	Nourdine Bourhane	26 May 2011	26 May 2016	Anjouan	Ikililou Dhoinine	
	Abdallah Said Sarouma	26 May 2016	26 May 2019	Mohéli	Azali Assoumani	
	Djaffar Ahmed Said (Note: In exile since 2018.)	26 May 2016	26 May 2019	Grande Comore	Azali Assoumani	
	Moustadroine Abdou	26 May 2016	26 May 2019	Anjouan	Azali Assoumani	
