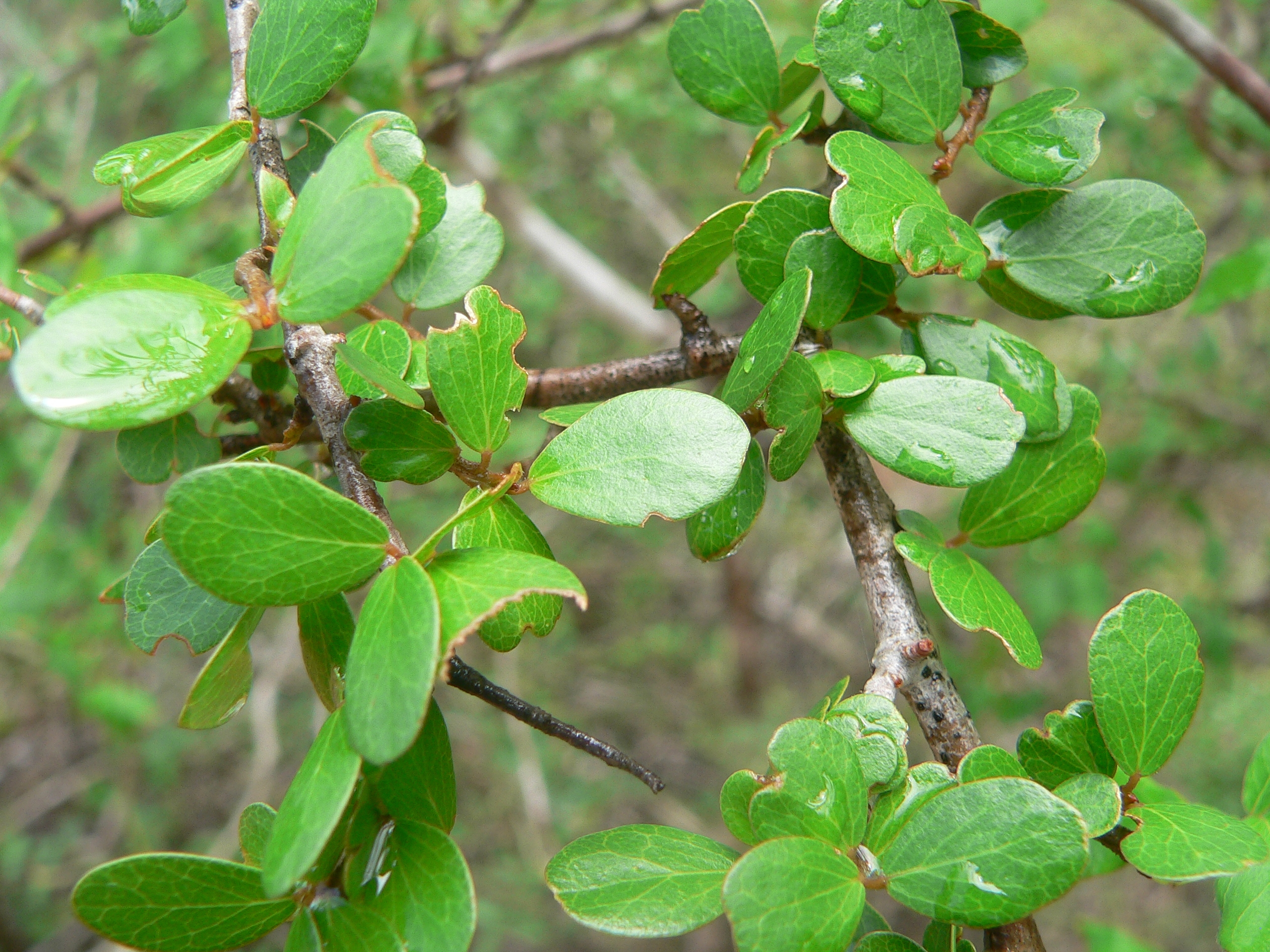

Conservation status
- Vulnerable (IUCN 3.1)

Scientific classification
- Kingdom: Plantae
- Clade: Tracheophytes
- Clade: Angiosperms
- Clade: Eudicots
- Clade: Rosids
- Order: Sapindales
- Family: Meliaceae
- Genus: Khaya
- Species: K. madagascariensis

Binomial name
- Khaya madagascariensis Jum. & H.Perrier

= Khaya madagascariensis =

Species of flowering plant

Khaya madagascariensis is a species of plant in the family Meliaceae. It is found in Comoros and Madagascar.

== Description ==
Khaya madagascariensis is an evergreen tree which grows 13 to 24 meters tall.

== Range and habitat ==
Khaya madagascariensis is native to Madagascar and Comoros. Its historic range includes the Northern and Central Highlands of Madagascar in the former provinces of Antsiranana, Fianarantsoa, Mahajanga, Toamasina and Toliara, and on the islands of Grande Comore and Mohéli and near Koni-Djodjo on Anjouan in the Comoros. It is known from 12 locations, and its estimated extent of occurrence (EOO) is 262,803 km^{2}, and the estimated area of occupancy (AOO) is 56 km^{2}.

Its natural habitat is dry and humid forest, from 5 to 1,000 meters elevation.

== Conservation and threats ==
There are currently 14 wild subpopulations, with an estimated population of 1,400 mature individuals among them. The species was over-exploited for its timber, and many wild subpopulations have been greatly reduced in size and several, particularly those in northwestern Madagascar, have disappeared entirely. Some remaining subpopulations are protected by local communities, and within Analamerana Special Reserve. Some subpopulations are still threatened by human-caused fires and conversion of habitat to cropland. The species is assessed as vulnerable.

The species is widely planted in Madagascar as an ornamental tree and in reforestation projects, and seeds are sold across the country.

== Uses ==
The reddish-brown wood is valued highly, and is used to make fine furniture, joinery, implements, and carvings. The trunks were traditionally used to make canoes.

The bark of the tree has traditional medicinal uses. It is ingested to treat fevers, and is applied externally to treat wounds and hemorrhages.
