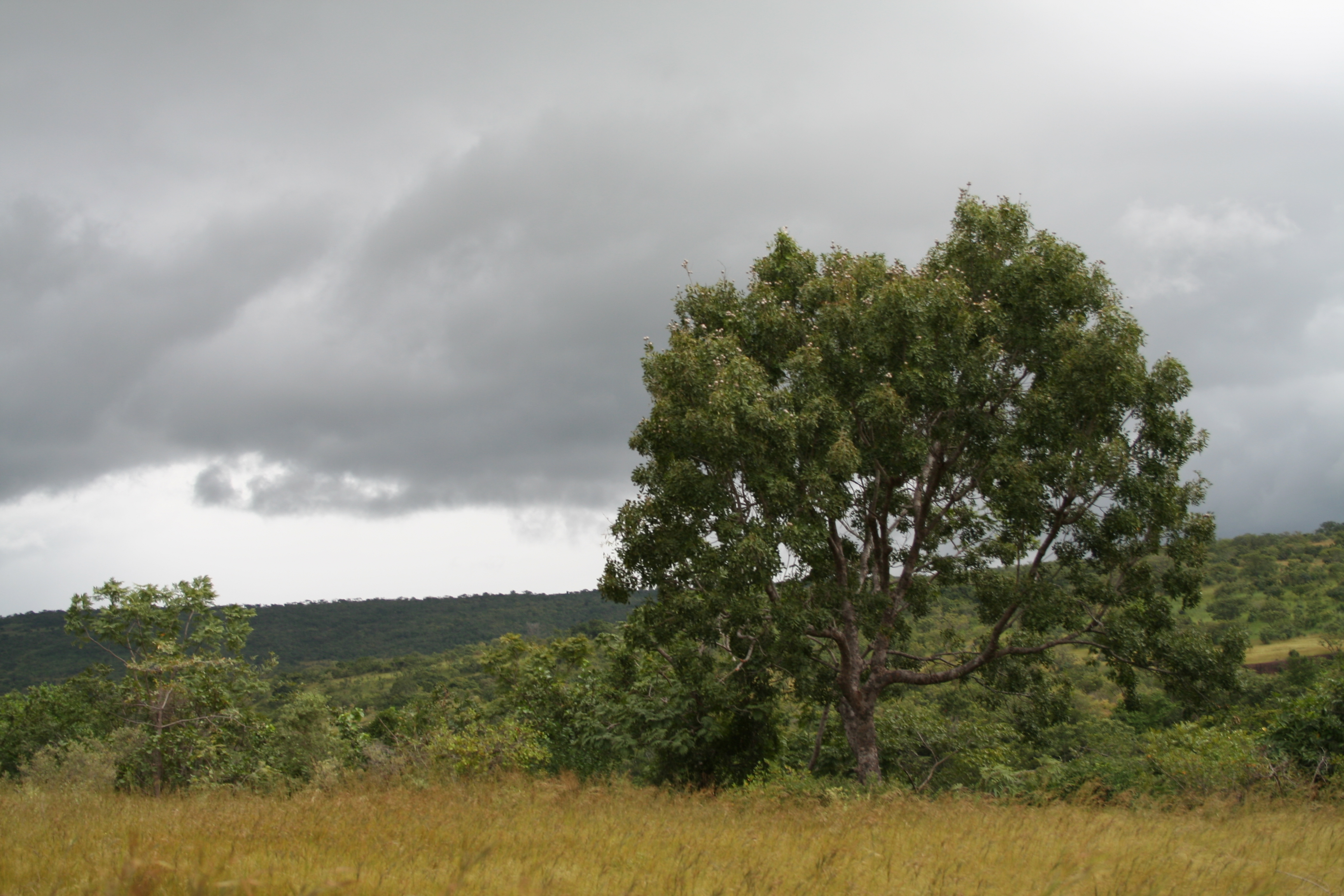
- Khaya senegalensis in habitat

Scientific classification
- Kingdom: Plantae
- Clade: Tracheophytes
- Clade: Angiosperms
- Clade: Eudicots
- Clade: Rosids
- Order: Sapindales
- Family: Meliaceae
- Subfamily: Cedreloideae
- Genus: Khaya; A.Juss.

Species
- See text

= Khaya =

Genus of trees

Khaya is a genus of five tree species in the mahogany family Meliaceae. The timber of Khaya is called African mahogany, and is valued as a substitute to American mahogany (of the genus Swietenia).

== Description ==
The genus is native to tropical Africa across various countries from Senegal to Sudan to Uganda, as well as Madagascar. All species grow to around 13–30 m tall, rarely 45 m, with a trunk over 1 m diameter, often buttressed at the base.

The leaves are pinnate, with 3-7 pairs of leaflets and the terminal leaflet absent; each leaflet is 8–17 cm long and 7 cm wide. The leaves can be either deciduous or evergreen depending on the species. The flowers are produced in loose inflorescences, each flower small, with four or five yellowish petals and ten stamens. The fruit is a globose four or five-valved capsule 5–8 cm diameter, containing numerous winged seeds.

== Species ==
- Khaya anthotheca (syn. K. nyasica)
- Khaya grandifoliola
- Khaya ivorensis
- Khaya madagascariensis
- Khaya senegalensis

== Uses ==
The timber of Khaya is called "African mahogany", with wood properties generally regarded as the closest to genuine mahogany. The timber provides high chatoyance, with an average value above 20 PZC.

Cross section of Khaya wood, known as African mahogany.

The seeds of K. senegalensis have an oil content of 52.5%, consisting of 21% palmitic acid, 10% stearic acid, 65% oleic acid, and 4% "unidentifiable acid"

The durable reddish-brown wood of K. anthotheca is used for dug-out canoes or makoros and as a general beam, door frame and shelving timber which is termite and borer resistant.

== See also ==
- Khaya, a Scottish band featuring future the Leg members
