= 2013 Comorian coup attempt =

Failed coup d'état in Comoros

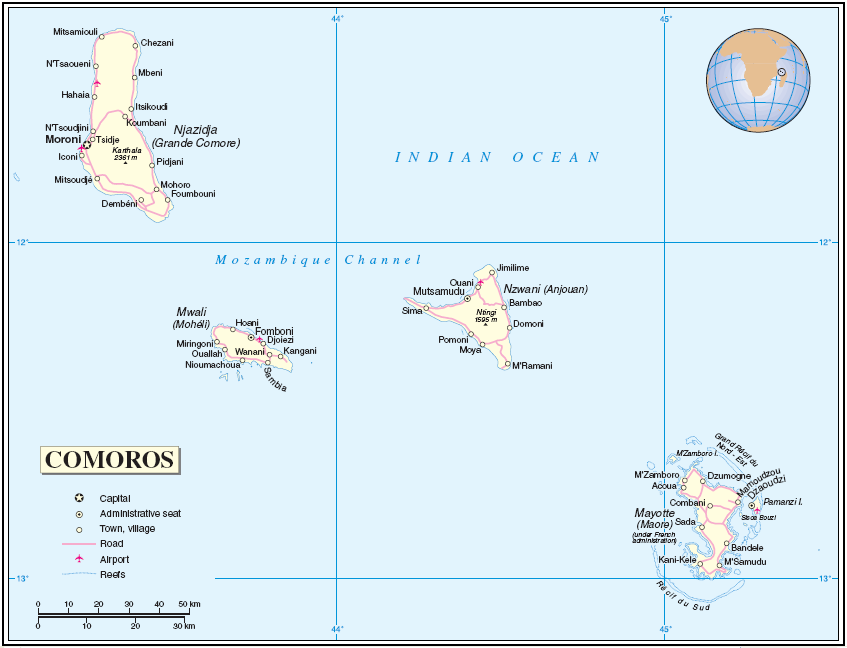
Date	April 2013
Location	Comoros
Result	Failure of the coup attempt

Belligerents
(Comoros) Army of National Development	(Comoros) Dissenting faction of the armed forces

Commanders and leaders
(Comoros) Ikililou Dhoinine	(Comoros) Ahmed Abdallah Sambi (Comoros) Mahmoud Ahmed Abdallah (Comoros) Patrick Klein

The 2013 Comorian coup attempt was a failed coup d'état in the Comoros against President Ikililou Dhoinine. Motives for the coup include discontent from the dismissals of officials connected with Dhoinine's predecessor Ahmed Abdallah Sambi, such as the head of the army. Former President Sambi, who had backed Dhoinine in the 2010 Comorian presidential election, was sidelined and kicked from his inner circle after the election.

In April 2013, state security apprehended as many as sixteen individuals due to suspicions of "planning a destabilizing act" within the country. Those detained include the son of former President Ahmed Abdallah Abderemane and a former Minister - Mahmoud Ahmed Abdallah. Foreign nationals were also implicated in the scheme, namely a French national, a Chadian national, and five Congolese nationals. The remaining individuals were Comorian military and civilian personnel. The detainees were then taken into custody in Kandani military camp.

France indicated its willingness to cooperate with the Comoros, with the French ambassador pledging the country's support after being informed some of its citizens were involved in the foiled coup.

Three days after the suspects were detained, Interior Minister Hamada Abdallah confirmed the coup attempt but provided no further details, only assuring that the country was safe, saying "Be reassured, because the country is safe." Though opposition leaders initially criticized the government for their secrecy regarding information around the incident, they later organized protests along with the ruling party to denounce the coup attempt. The united march centered around condemning mercenaries aiming to disrupt political stability within the country as the opposition claimed Patrick Klein, who had worked under the infamous Bob Denard, had significant involvement in the failed coup. Bob Denard was involved in four different coup attempts in the Comoros.
