= Abdou Djabir =

Comorian politician and civil servant

Abdou Djabir Msada is a Comorian politician and civil servant. He ran for the Presidency of the Comoros in 2010 and finished in third place behind winner Ikililou Dhoinine. Djabir was born on the island of Mohéli and worked as a civil servant in France.
