= Minister of Finance and Budget (Comoros) =

Minister of finance and budget of Chad

Minister of Finance and Budget of Comoros is a government minister in charge of the Ministry of Finance and Budget of Comoros, responsible for public finances of the country.

== Ministers responsible for finance ==
- Ahmed Abdou, 1973–1975
- Said Attoumane, 1975
- Mohammed Toilibu, 1975-1976
- Abdou Salam, 1976
- Tadjidine Ben Said Massounde, 1976-1978
- Said Kafe, 1978-1980
- Ali Fadhulli, 1980
- Said Kafe, 1980-1982
- Ali Nassor, 1982-1985
- Said Ahmed Said Ali, 1985-1989
- Tadjidine Ben Said Massounde, 1990
- Ahmed Abdallah Sourette, 1990-1991
- Mohamed Said Abdallah M'Changama, 1991–1992
- Caabi El-Yachroutu Mohamed, 1992-1993
- Ahmed El Harif Mamidi, 1993-1994-?
- Ahamadi Abdoulbastoi, ?-1995
- Abdul Madjid Youssouf, 1995-1996
- Said Ali Kemal, 1996
- Dalihou Omar, 1996
- Mohamed Ali Soilihi, 1996-1998
- Ali Boina Mze, 1998
- Said Said Hamadi, 1998-1999
- Housseine Soilihi, 1999
- Abdou Assoumani, 1999–2000
- Soundi Abdou Toybou, 2000–2001
- Aboudou Assoumani, 2001–2002
- Mohamed Ali Soilihi, 2002
- Caabi El-Yachroutu Mohamed, 2002–2004
- Ahamadi Abdoulbastoi, 2004–2005
- Oubeidi Mzé Chei, 2005-2006
- Hassane Hamadi, 2006-2007
- Mohamed Ali Soilihi, 2007-2009
- Ikililou Dhoinine, 2009–2010
- Ahamadi Abdoulbastoi, 2010
- Mohamed Bacar Dossar, 2010-2011
- Mohamed Ali Soilihi, 2011–2016
- Said Ali Cheyhane, 2016-2021
- Kamalidini Souef, 2021-2022
- Mzé Abdou Mohamed Chanfiou, 2022-2024
- Ibrahim Mohamed Abdourazak, 2024-

== See also ==
- Central Bank of the Comoros
- Economy of Comoros
