= 2022 in the Comoros =

- Decades: 2000s; 2010s; 2020s
- See also: Other events of 2022; List of years in Comoros

Events in the year 2022 in the Comoros.

== Incumbents ==
- President: Azali Assoumani
- President of the Assembly: Moustadroine Abdou

== Events ==
Ongoing — COVID-19 pandemic in the Comoros

26 August - President Azali Assoumani held a video-conference with the prime minister of Japan, Fumio Kishida.

=== Africa Cup of Nations ===
10 January - In the Africa Cup of Nations, Comoros loses 1–0 to Gabon.

18 January - Comoros wins 3–2 over Ghana.

24 January - In the Round of 16, Comoros is eliminated after a loss of 2–2 to Cameroon.
