= Abdou Mohamed Chanfiou =

Comorian politician

Mzé Abdou Mohamed Chanfiou is a Comorian politician and banker.

Chanfiou was born around 1960 in Mbéni, Grande Comore. He is an economist. He got a degree from University of Lille. Chanfiou worked in the Central Bank of the Comoros as director of research and vice governor. He was appointed as governor of the bank by President Sambi in 2011. He was governor until 2016.

Chanfiou was appointed as minister of economy in 2021. He was then appointed as Minister of Finance, Budget and Banking in 2022, and served until June 2024. He was awarded 'best finance minister in Africa' by Africa Governance Award in 2023.
