= Islamic Development Bank =

Multilateral development financing institution located in Jeddah, Saudi Arabia

- Members of the Islamic Development Bank
- Abbreviation: IsDB
- Formation: 1975
- Type: Development bank
- Location: Jeddah, Saudi Arabia
- Members: 57 countries
- Key people: Muhammed Al-Jasser, President
- Employees: 932
- Website: www.isdb.org

The Islamic Development Bank (IsDB; Arabic: البنك الإسلامي للتنمية) is a multilateral development finance institution that is focused on Islamic finance for infrastructure development and located in Jeddah, Saudi Arabia. There are 57 shareholding member states with the largest single shareholder being Saudi Arabia.

== History ==
It was founded in 1973 by the Finance Ministers at the first Organisation of the Islamic Conference (now called the Organisation of Islamic Cooperation) with the support of the King of Saudi Arabia at the time (Faisal), and began its activities on 3 April 1975.Ahmed Mohammed Ali Al-Madani was installed as the inaugural president and served until 2015.

On 22 May 2013, IsDB tripled its authorized capital to $150 billion to better serve Muslims in member and non-member countries. The Bank has received credit ratings of AAA from Standard & Poor's, Moody's, and Fitch. Saudi Arabia holds about one quarter of the bank's paid up capital. The IDB is an observer at the United Nations General Assembly.

== Membership ==
The present membership of the Bank consists of 57 countries. The basic condition for membership is that the prospective member country should be a member of the Organisation of Islamic Cooperation (OIC), pay its contribution to the capital of the Bank and be willing to accept such terms and conditions as may be decided upon by the IsDB Board of Governors.

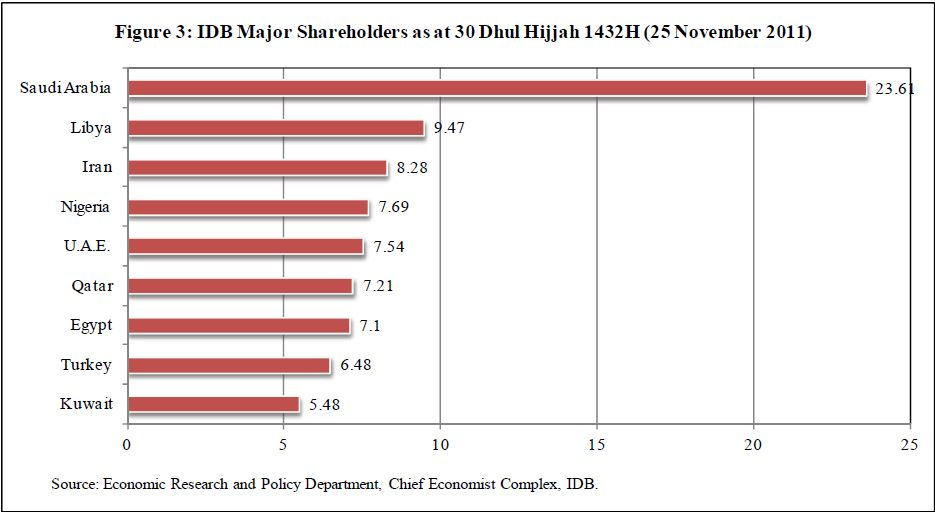
IDB Major Shareholders as at 30 Dhul Hijjah 1432H (25 November 2011)

Ranked on the basis of paid-up capital (as of May 2024), major shareholders include:

1. Saudi Arabia (22.5%)
2. Libya (9.03%)
3. Indonesia (7.94%)
4. Iran (7.90%)
5. Nigeria (7.33%)
6. Qatar (6.87%)
7. Egypt (6.77%)
8. Kuwait (6.62%)
9. United Arab Emirates (6.48%)
10. Turkey (6.17%)

== Structure ==
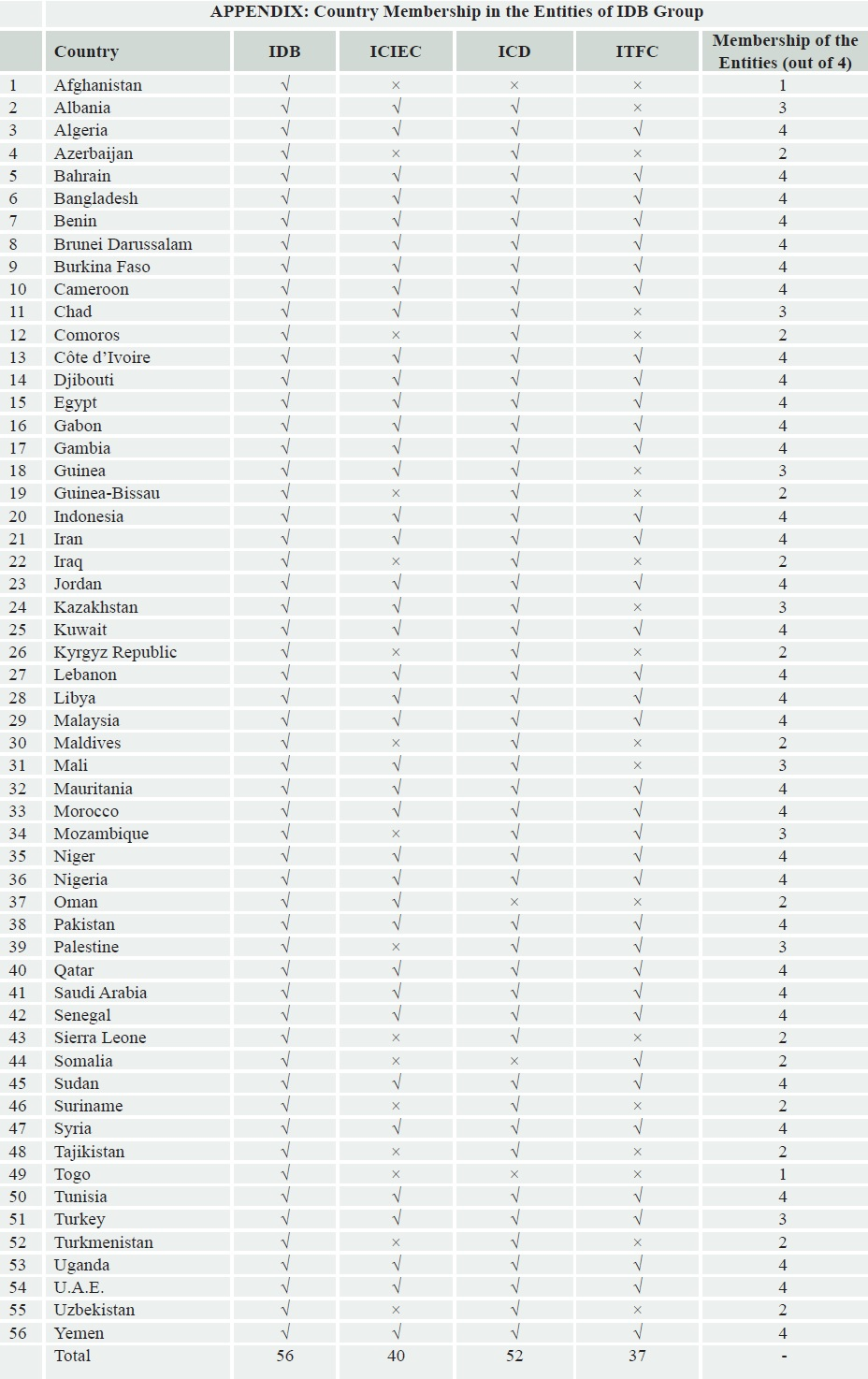
Country Membership in the Entities of IsDB Group

IDB has evolved into a group of five entities, consisting of Islamic Development Bank (IsDB), Islamic Development Bank Institute (IsDBI), Islamic Corporation for Development of the Private Sector (ICD), Islamic Corporation for Insurance of Investment and Export Credit (ICIEC) and International Islamic Trade Finance Corporation (ITFC).

== Activities ==
IDB Group is engaged in a wide range of specialized and integrated activities such as:

- Project financing in the public and private sectors;
- Development assistance for poverty alleviation;
- Technical assistance for capacity-building;
- Economic and trade cooperation among member countries;
- Trade financing;
- SME financing;
- Resource mobilization;
- Direct equity investment in Islamic financial institutions;
- Insurance and reinsurance coverage for investment and export credit;
- Research and training programs in Islamic economics and banking;
- Awqaf investment and financing;
- Special assistance and scholarships for member countries and Muslim communities in non-member countries;
- Emergency relief; and
- Advisory services for public and private entities in member countries.

=== Projects and programs ===
- The Gao Bridge in Mali: Until a few years ago, crossing the Niger River at Gao was done by a ferry that might or might not be operating. This hindered progress and discouraged trade. The Gao Bridge financed by the IDB connected the once isolated Gao Region in eastern Mali to the heartland.

== See also ==
- Economy of the Organisation of Islamic Cooperation
- Asian Development Bank
- Asian Infrastructure Investment Bank
- European Bank for Reconstruction and Development
- African Development Bank
- Caribbean Development Bank
- CAF – Development Bank of Latin America and the Caribbean
- European Investment Bank
- Inter-American Development Bank
- International Islamic Trade Finance Corporation
- Islamic banking
- Islamic Organisation for Food Security
