= Governor of Mohéli =

The governor of Mohéli is the head of the autonomous government of Mohéli, the smallest island of the Comoros. The position was established in 2002 following the adoption of the Comorian Constitution of 2001.

Mohamed Said Fazul, elected in April 2002 as a supporter of the then-President of the Union Azali Assoumani, served as the island's first president. He took office on 19 May 2002. After two rounds of elections in June 2007, Fazul was defeated by Mohamed Ali Said, who took office on 1 July 2007.

== Presidents of Mohéli (2002-2009) ==
- Mohamed Said Fazul (19 May 2002 - 19 May 2007)
- Vacant (19 May 2007 - 22 May 2007)
- Youssouf El-Farouk (22 May 2007 - 1 July 2007) (interim)
- Mohamed Ali Said (1 July 2007 – 2009)

== Governors of Mohéli (since 2009) ==
- Mohamed Ali Said (2009 – 2016)
- Mohamed Said Fazul (2016 - 2024)
- Chamina Ben Mohamed (Since 2024)
