= Arthur Kleinclausz =

Arthur Kleinclausz (8 April 1869, in Auxonne – 30 November 1947, in Lyon) was a French medieval historian, best known for his work associated with the histories of Burgundy, Lyon and of the Carolingian era.

He studied history at Lyon, and afterwards worked as a high school teacher in Belfort and Dijon. In 1904 he was appointed professor of medieval history at the University of Lyon, where in 1931 he became dean to the Faculty of Letters.

From 1922 to 1941 he served as president of the Commission des musées de Lyon, and in 1925 was named director of the École des Beaux Arts de Lyon.

== Selected works ==
- L'Empire carolingien, ses origines et ses transformations, 1902 – The Carolingian Empire, its origins and its transformations.
- Le Christianisme, les barbares, Mérovingiens et Carolingiens, (Christianity, the barbarians, Merovingians and Carolingians), 1903, with Charles Bayet and Christian Pfister, volume II, part I of Histoire de France depuis les origines jusqu'à la Révolution, a project headed by Ernest Lavisse.
- Claus Sluter et la sculpture bourguignonne au XVe siècle, 1905 – Claus Sluter and Bungundian sculpture of the 15th century.
- Dijon et Beaune, 1907 – Dijon and Beaune.
- Histoire de Bourgogne, 1909, 2nd edition 1924 – History of Burgundy.
- Lyon, des origines à nos jours : la formation de la cité, 1925 – Lyon, from its origins until today. The formation of the city.
- La Provence, 1930 – Provence.
- Charlemagne, 1934 – Charlemagne.
- Eginhard, 1942 – Eginhard.
- Alcuin, 1948 – Alcuin.
