= Christian Pfister =

French historian (1857–1933)

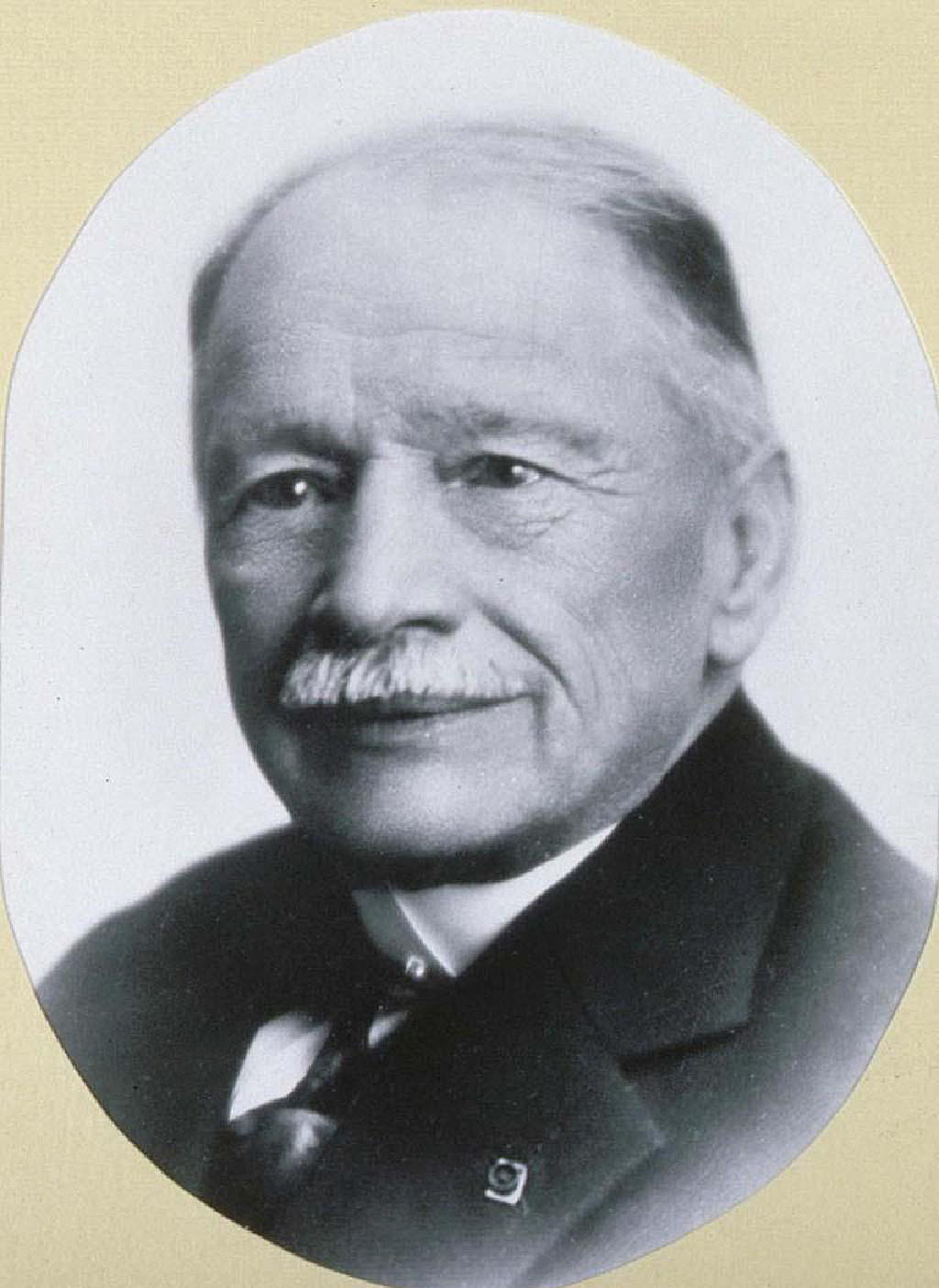
Christian Pfister (1920)

Christian Pfister, name sometimes given as Chrétien Pfister (13 February 1857 in Beblenheim – 16 May 1933 in Beblenheim) was a French historian. He was the author of numerous writings associated with Alsace and Lorraine.

He received his education at the École Normale Supérieure, and in 1881 obtained his agrégation in history. Afterwards, he worked as a lecturer at the universities of Besançon (from 1882) and Nancy (from 1884). From 1887 to 1902 he was a professor of history at the University of Nancy. From 1904 he served as a professor at the Sorbonne in Paris, then in 1919 relocated to the University of Strasbourg, where in 1927 he was named academic rector.

== Published works ==
He was the author of a major work on the history of Nancy, titled "Histoire de Nancy", being published in three volumes from 1902 to 1909. With Charles Bayet and Arthur Kleinclausz, he was co-author of "Le Christianisme, les barbares. Mérovingiens et Carolingiens", (Christianity, the barbarians, Merovingians and Carolingians; 1903), a work that was part of "Histoire de France depuis les origines jusqu'à la révolution", a multi-volume project on French history that was headed by Ernest Lavisse. Other noted written works by Pfister include:

- Études sur le règne de Robert le Pieux (996-1031), 1885 – Studies on the reign of Robert the Pious.
- Jean-Daniel Schoepflin. Étude biographique, 1887 – Johann Daniel Schöpflin, a biographical study.
- Les manuscrits allemands de la Bibliothéque Nationale relatifs à l'histoire d'Alsace, 1893 – The German manuscripts of the National Library relating to the history of Alsace.
- Lectures alsaciennes, géographie - histoire - biographies : 50 lectures, 1917 – Alsatian lectures, geography - history - biographies: 50 lectures.
- La question d'Alsace Lorraine, 1918 (with Ernest Lavisse) – The question of Alsace-Lorraine.
- La formation de l'Alsace-Lorraine, 1918 with (Ernest Lavisse) – The formation of Alsace-Lorraine.
- La frontiére entre l'Alsace et le Palatinat, 1918 – Regarding the border between Alsace and the Palatinate.
