= Caabi El-Yachroutu Mohamed =

Comorian politician

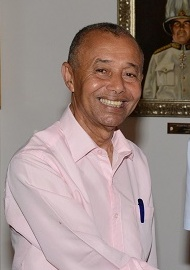
Caabi El-Yachroutu Mohamed

Caabi El-Yachroutu Mohamed (born 1949) is a Comorian politician. He was the country's Vice-President from May 2002 until 27 February 2006, when he resigned in order to participate in the upcoming election for a new 19th and Union president. He was eliminated in the first round of that election.

== Biography ==
He was director general of the Comoros Development Bank from 1982 until 1992, when he was appointed as Minister of Finance by President Said Mohamed Djohar. However, he lost the position in 1993. He then served as Prime Minister from 29 April 1995 to 27 March 1996 and interim President from 5 October 1995 to 26 January 1996.

He also served as Secretary-General of the Indian Ocean Commission. Later, he was a supporter of Anjouan President Mohamed Bacar. A few days after the March 2008 invasion of Anjouan, which toppled Bacar, he was arrested, having indicated his willingness to surrender to the Comoran army.

Political offices
Preceded by Halifa Houmadi	Prime Minister of the Comoros; 1995–1996	Succeeded by Tadjidine Ben Said Massounde
Preceded by Said Mohamed Djohar	President of the Comoros; 1995–1996	Succeeded by Said Mohamed Djohar
Preceded by office created	Vice President of the Comoros; 2002–2006; Served alongside: Rachidi ben Massonde	Succeeded by Idi Nadhoim; Ikililou Dhoinine
