= 2023 in the Comoros =

- Decades: 2000s; 2010s; 2020s
- See also: Other events of 2023; List of years in Comoros

Events in the year 2023 in the Comoros.

== Incumbents ==
- President: Azali Assoumani
- President of the Assembly: Moustadroine Abdou

== Events ==
Ongoing — COVID-19 pandemic in the Comoros

== Sports ==
- 19 August 2023 – 27 August 2023: Comoros at the 2023 World Athletics Championships
- 28 July 2023 – 8 August 2023: Comoros at the 2021 Summer World University Games
- 14 July – 30 July: Comoros at the 2023 World Aquatics Championships
