= 2024 in the Comoros =

- Decades: 2000s; 2010s; 2020s
- See also: Other events of 2024; List of years in Comoros

Events in the year 2024 in the Comoros.

== Incumbents ==
- President: Azali Assoumani
- President of the Assembly: Moustadroine Abdou

== Events ==
- 14 January: 2024 Comorian presidential election Incumbent president Azali Assoumani is announced as the winner.
- 11 April: Thirty-eight prisoners escape from a prison in Moroni.
- 7 August: President Azali Assoumani grants extensive powers to his son and alleged successor Nour El Fath, allowing him to intervene throughout multiple stages of government decision-making.
- 20 August: Comoros joins the World Trade Organization as its 165th member.
- 13 September: President Assoumani is slightly injured after being stabbed at a funeral in Salimani. The suspect, a 24-year old soldier, is arrested but is subsequently found dead in his prison cell on 14 September.
