= 2021 in the Comoros =

- Decades: 2000s; 2010s; 2020s
- See also: Other events of 2021; List of years in Comoros

Events in the year 2021 in the Comoros.

== Incumbents ==
- President: Azali Assoumani
- President of the Assembly: Moustadroine Abdou

== Events ==
Ongoing — COVID-19 pandemic in the Comoros; public gatherings banned throughout 2021
