= Djaffar Ahmed Said =

Comorian politician

Djaffar Ahmed Said Hassani (born 20 February 1966) is Comorian politician from Grande Comore. From 26 May 2016, he served as the Vice-President of the Comoros for Economy, Planning, Industry, Crafts, Investments, Private Sector and Land Affairs in the Comoros.

He opposed the constitutional changes which President Azali Assoumani sought in the 2018 Comorian constitutional referendum. In September 2018, an arrest warrant was published for him on charges of plotting against the state. The Comoros subsequently sought his extradition from Tanzania. In December 2018 he was sentenced to a life sentence of forced labour. His brother received the same sentence. In 2019 the sentence of his brother was reduced to 20 years.

Said returned to the Comoros in December 2021 after having received a presidential pardon. He had spent time in exile in Tanzania and France.
