= Chamina Ben Mohamed =

Comorian politician

Chamina Ben Mohamed is a Comorian politician.

She is a member of the Assembly of the Union of the Comoros.

She has been the elected Governor of Mohéli since May 2024.
