= Kafe District, Abuja =

Kafe District, Cadastral Zone C05, is one of three districts in Abuja city, Nigeria. It is the last part of Gwarinpa district under the Abuja Municipal Area Council. It is a 35-kilometre (22 mi) drive from the central district and contains a fast-growing housing estate. Although the population of this district is unknown as a census has not been specifically carried out yet.
