= Mohamed Hassanaly =

Politician from Mohéli

Mohamed Hassanaly sometimes written as Mohamed Hassan Ali (1941 — 2 January 2021) was a politician of the Comorian island of Mohéli. He serves as the first Vice-President of the Comoros from January 1976. For the 2002 presidency of Mohéli, he lost from his rival Mohamed Said Fazul. After his death he was described as a main national political figure and an iconic leader.

== Biography ==
Hassanaly was born in 1941 in Fomboni, Mohéli. He was the oldest of 11 children. After primary school in Fomboni, he attended the Moroni College, high school in Madagascar and studied economics and commerce in Antananarivo.

As being a patriot, he campaigned for independence and national unity. In 1972, as a deputy, he voted for the resolution calling for independence but was the only one to vote against the election of Ahmed Abdallah. He was a member of political party UDJAMAA. He took part in Paris in the negotiations and the signing of the agreements of 15 June 1973, the beginning of the process towards independence. After independence in 1975, he was elected by the National Council of the Revolution, as Vice-President of Ali Soilihi in January 1976. He so became the first Vice-President of the State of the Comoros. In 1991 he was co-founder of “Front Populaires de Comores” (FPC) and became its president. In 1994, the FPC took part in the creation of the Forum for National Recovery bringing together the main opposition parties.

In the second round of the elections for the presidency of Mohéli on 7 April 2002, he lost from his rival Mohamed Said Fazul with 44% of the vote against 56%, while he had received more votes in the first round.

On 6 July 2005 he received from president Azali Assoumani the rank of Grand Chancellor of the Order of the Green Crescent, the highest distinction of the Comores.

Hassanaly died on 2 January 2021 at the age of 79. He had six children and several grandchildren.
