= Moheli scops owl =

Conservation status
- Endangered (IUCN 3.1)
- CITES Appendix II

Scientific classification
- Kingdom: Animalia
- Phylum: Chordata
- Class: Aves
- Order: Strigiformes
- Family: Strigidae
- Genus: Otus
- Species: O. moheliensis

Binomial name
- Otus moheliensis Lafontaine & Moulaert, 1998

Species of owl

The Moheli scops owl (Otus moheliensis) is a scops owl endemic to the island of Mohéli, one of the Comoro Islands.

== Description ==
The Moheli scops owl has two colour morphs, the rufous morph has reddish-brown plumage which is and weakly marked with dark streaks and bars; the brown morph has a darker brown plumage, which is boldly marked with streaks and vermiculations. Both morphs have yellow-green eyes, grey legs and black beaks. Their length is approximately 22 cm (8.7 in).

=== Voice ===
The Moheli scops owl is highly vocal, producing hissing whistles and screeches in a series of five notes, as well as screeching.

== Distribution and habitat ==
This owl is found only on the mountain in the centre of the island of Mohéli, the total range covering 21 km^{2} (8.1 sq mi), including the highest point of the ridge, at 790 m (2,590 ft) in altitude, and the adjacent upper slopes. It occurs in dense humid forest, which is rich in epiphytes between 450 and 790 m (1,480 and 2,590 ft).

== Behaviour ==
The Moheli scops owl is strictly nocturnal and becomes active only after sunset. Calling males have been recorded in September. The diet is probably mainly made up of insects.

== Conservation and status ==
The species was only described in 1998. It has an estimated population of 400, and is classified as critically endangered due to it being restricted to such a small area, which is being rapidly deforested. In 1995, only five percent of the island still had intact, dense, humid forest. As well as habitat loss, other threats to the Moheli scops owl include hunting and black rats, which may eat its eggs and young but also compete with it for food. At present, the montane forest where the Moheli scops owl occurs is not protected.
