= Said Kafe =

Comorian politician

Said Mahdi Soilihi Kafe (1937 – 25 May 2002) was a Comorian political figure in the regime of Ahmed Abdallah.

Kafe was born in 1937 in Mtsapere, Mayotte. He served as minister of finance from 1978 until 1982, and minister of foreign affairs from 1982 to 1990. He left office soon after the 1989 coup in which Abdallah was killed. He died in Paris, France.
