= Abdallah Said Sarouma =

Abdallah Said Sarouma (born December 31, 1956) is a Comorian politician from Mohéli. From 26 May 2016 to 26 May 2019, he has served as the Vice President responsible for Transport, Posts and Telecommunication and Information and Communication Technology for the Comoros.
