= List of years in Comoros =

This is a timeline of Comoros history. Each article deals with events in Comoros in a given year.

== Twentieth century ==
1990s
1990
1991
1992
1993
1994
1995
1996
1997
1998
1999

1980s
1980
1981
1982
1983
1984
1985
1986
1987
1988
1989

1970s
1970
1971
1972
1973
1974
1975
1976
1977
1978
1979

1960s
1960
1961
1962
1963
1964
1965
1966
1967
1968
1969

== Twenty-first century ==
- 2000s: 2000 2001 2002 2003 2004 2005 2006 2007 2008 2009
- 2010s: 2010 2011 2012 2013 2014 2015 2016 2017 2018 2019
- 2020s: 2020 2021 2022 2023 2024 2025
