= Khaya grandifoliola =

Conservation status
- Vulnerable (IUCN 2.3)

Scientific classification
- Kingdom: Plantae
- Clade: Tracheophytes
- Clade: Angiosperms
- Clade: Eudicots
- Clade: Rosids
- Order: Sapindales
- Family: Meliaceae
- Genus: Khaya
- Species: K. grandifoliola

Binomial name
- Khaya grandifoliola C.DC.

Species of flowering plant

Khaya grandifoliola, also called African mahogany, Benin mahogany, large-leaved mahogany, or Senegal mahogany, is a species of plant in the family Meliaceae. It is found in Benin, the Democratic Republic of the Congo, Ivory Coast, Ghana, Guinea, Nigeria, Sudan, Togo, and Uganda. It is threatened by habitat loss.

== Medical uses ==
In many malaria endemic countries, like the tropics, the extract of Khaya grandifoliola is used as an antimalarial herbal remedy. Recent studies show that 90% of malaria cases around the world come from sub-Saharan Africa. People in these areas resort to medicinal plants for treatment because alternative medical resources are often low or unavailable. The bark and seeds of Khaya grandifoliola are the most common parts used for treatment and are extracted by infusion or decoction. The extracts have proven to fight against the P. falciparum parasite, one of the vectors of malaria in humans.

Crude water extracts of Khaya grandifoliola have shown to have therapeutic effectiveness on mice. A study was designed to show the effects of the extract on the red blood cells and bone of mice for 3 weeks and 7 day. Doses of the extract that were administered daily had no impact on mortality rates, physical appearance or behavior of the rats. The results of the experiment indicated that K. grandifoliola had a positive effect on red blood cell production and no real effect on bone mineral contents at therapeutic doses. Studies have shown that the optimum therapeutic dose size is about 5.5 g/kg body weight.

== Sources ==
- Odugbemi TO, Akinsulire OR, Aibinu IE, Fabeku PO (2007). "Medicinal Plants Useful For Malaria Therapy In Okeigbo, Ondo State, Southwest Nigeria". African Journal of Traditional, Complementary and Alternative Medicines. 4 (2): 191–8. doi:10.4314/ajtcam.v4i2.31207. PMC 2816451. PMID 20162091.
- Bumah VV, Essien EU, Agbedahunsi JM, Eka OU (2005). "Effects of Khaya grandifoliola on red blood cells and bone mineral content in rats". Phytother Res. 19 (11): 928–31. doi:10.1002/ptr.1750. PMID 16317647. S2CID 22941118.
- Bickii J, Njifutie N, Foyere JA, Basco LK, Ringwald P (2000). "In vitro antimalarial activity of limonoids from Khaya grandifoliola C.D.C. (Meliaceae)". J Ethnopharmacol. 69 (1): 27–33. doi:10.1016/S0378-8741(99)00117-8. PMID 10661881.
