= Rachid ben Massoundi =

Comorian politician

Rachid ben Massoundi is a politician from Comoros from Mohéli, and former Vice-President of the Comoros.

He is an engineer by profession. He was elected as Vice-President of the Comoros in the ticket of Azali Assoumani and served as one of the Vice-Presidents from 26 May 2002 to 26 May 2006. He was simultaneously Minister of Justice, Information, Religious Affairs and Human Rights.

Later in 2011, ben Massoundi was one of the diplomatic advisors of president Ikililou Dhoinine until 2014. In 2014, he was appointed as the head of planning department in the ministry of environment and forests. In the 2016 presidential elections, he was vice presidential candidate in the ticket of Orange Party presidential candidate Mohamed Daoudou.
