= 2020 in the Comoros =

- Decades: 2000s; 2010s; 2020s
- See also: Other events of 2020; List of years in Comoros

Events in the year 2020 in the Comoros.

== Incumbents ==
- President: Azali Assoumani

== Events ==
Ongoing – COVID-19 pandemic in the Comoros

=== April ===
- 15 April – A person arriving in Mayotte from the country tested positive for COVID-19.
- 16 April – Dominique Voynet, Director of Mayotte Regional Health Agency, announced that a person who died on 8 April before being evacuated to Mayotte on the basis of an x-ray of COVID-19 was Said Toihir, the Grand Mufti of the country. The announcement caused a diplomatic rift between the country and France. Mohamed El-Amine Souef, the Foreign Minister, said "If a case is confirmed in the Comoros, it is not Dominique Voynet to announce it, we have been independent since 6 July 1975."
- 17 April – The World Health Organization delivered medical aid to the country.
- 22 April – A polymerase chain reaction (PCR) screening machine was delivered to the country, allowing for COVID-19 testing the country starting on 23 April.
- 30 April – The first case of COVID-19 in the country was confirmed: a 50-year-old man who was admitted to the El-Maarouf hospital in Moroni on 23 April. The patient had been in contact with a Franco-Comorian national on 18 March. As a result of the confirmation, President Azali Assoumani disclosed that a curfew had been instituted.

=== May ===
- 2 May – A video conference was held between President Assoumani and President Rajoelina of Madagascar. Madagascar will send medical aid to the country.
- 4 May – The first COVID-19 death in the country was reported.
- 6 May – President Azali Assoumani announced that total confinement is not an option for the islands. A donation of 100,000 face masks had been received, and India will be sending medical supplies and doctors to support the local health care.
- 8 May – UNICEF donated 5 ventilators to the Ministry of Health. Comoros had nearly 25 ventilators on the three islands.
- 13 May – The United Nations donated 1,000 rapid tests to the Ministry of Health.
- 16 May – The first repatriation flight arrived from Tanzania with 134 people on board, with 70 people returned from Kenya. Two more flights are planned to arrive from Tanzania on 17 May.
- 19 May – The presence of COVID-19 on Anjouan (Ngazidja) was confirmed, making the virus now active on all major islands.
- 21 May – The Grand Mufti requested that the people celebrate Eid al-Fitr at home as a result of the pandemic.

=== July ===
- 8 July – The President made wearing face masks outdoors mandatory on the whole territory.
- 21 July – The island of Mohéli reported that it no longer had active COVID-19 cases.

== See also ==
- List of years in Comoros
