= Yves de Daruvar =

French military officer and politician (1921–2018)

Yves de Daruvar (31 March 1921 – 28 May 2018) was a French military officer and politician who was the Secretary-general of French Somaliland from 1959 to 1962, and the High Commissioner of Comoros from 1962 to 1963.
