= Charles Bayet =

French historian (1849–1918)

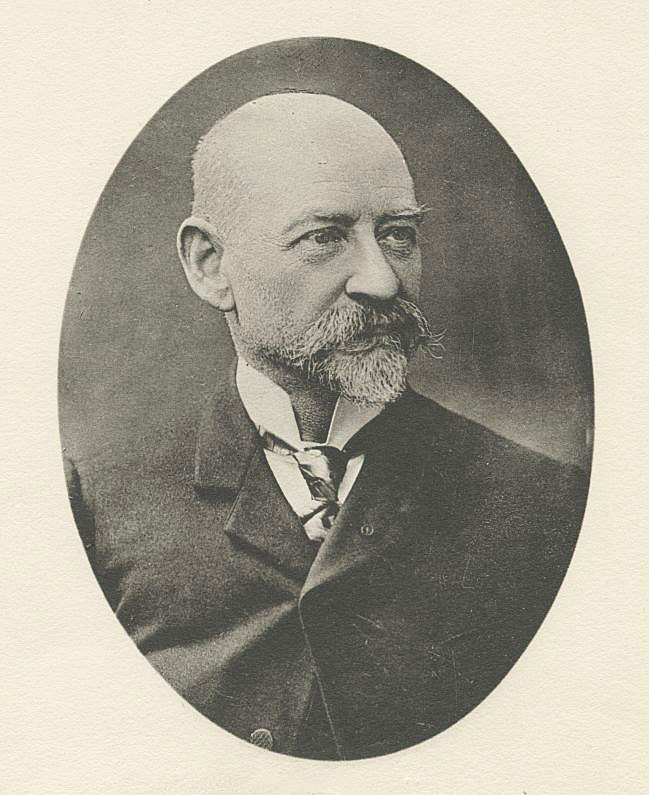
Charles Bayet

Charles Marie Adolphe Louis Bayet (25 May 1849, Liège – 16 September 1918, Toulon) was a French historian, who was a specialist in Byzantine art.

== Biography ==
From 1868 he studied at the École Normale Supérieure in Paris, then enlisted for military service during the Franco-Prussian War. In late September 1871 he obtained French citizenship. After spending time studying in Rome, he became a member of the French School at Athens (1873). During the following year, with Louis Duchesne, he participated in a research expedition to Mount Athos.

From 1881 to 1890 he was a professor of history and antiquities of the Middle Ages at the Faculty of Letters in Lyon. Within this time frame, he also became a professor of general art history at the École des Beaux Arts de Lyon (from 1886). In 1890 he was appointed rector at the Academy of Lille. From 1896 he served as director of primary schooling at the Ministry of Education, and several years later, became director of higher education (1902). Despite being in his mid-60s, he volunteered for military duty at the outbreak of war in 1914 – he succumbed to illness while serving as a lieutenant at the Macedonian front and was compelled to return to France.

== Published works ==
In 1883 he published L'art byzantin, a comprehensive work on Byzantine art that involved its palaces, churches, paintings, enamels, ceramics, and mosaics.

- Les élections pontificales sous les Carolingiens : VIIIe et IXe siècle, 1883 – Papal elections under the Carolingians: eighth and ninth century.
- L'art byzantin, 1883 – Byzantine art.
- Les derniers Carolingiens 877-987 : extrait des annales de Saint Bertin, d'Abbo, de Flodoard, de Richard. L'histoire de France racontée par les contemporains, 1884 – The last Carolingians, 877 to 987.
- Précis d'histoire de l'art, 1886 – Synoptic history of art.
- Le Christianisme, les Barbares, Mérovingiens et Carolingiens, T. 2,1 (1903); with Christian Pfister and Arthur Kleinclausz. (Christianity, the barbarians, Merovingians and Carolingians). part of series: Histoire de France depuis les origines jusqu'à la révolution, a project headed by Ernest Lavisse.
- Giotto, 1904 – Giotto di Bondone.
