= Fouad Mohadji =

Comorian politician

Fouad Mohadji (born 24 October 1959 in Fomboni) is a politician from Comoros from Mohéli who served as Vice-President of the Comoros from 26 May 2011 to 26 May 2016. He was also the minister of health. He studied journalism in Moscow State University and was teacher of French and philosophy.
