= Mohamed Said Fazul =

Comorian politician (born 1960)

Mohamed Said Fazul is Comorian politician and twice President and Governor of Mohéli.

He was born in 1960 in Boingoma in Mohéli. He worked as a pharmacist and taught natural sciences at a Fomboni college. He was director of the Islamic College of Fomboni from 1992 to 2001.

He was nominated by President Azali Assoumani in March 2001 to be governor of Mohéli. He benefited from his incumbent position as island governor and the backing of Azali in beating his rival, Mohamed Hassanaly, in the second round of the elections for the presidency of Mohéli on 7 April 2002, although Hassanally had received more votes in the first round. He was president of Mohéli from 19 May 2002 to 1 July 2007. After two rounds of elections in June 2007, he was defeated by Mohamed Ali Said, who took office on 1 July.

However, in 2016 he was elected again as Governor of Mohéli. He served as governor until 2024.
