= 2015 in the Comoros =

- Decades: 1990s; 2000s; 2010s; 2020s
- See also: Other events of 2015; List of years in Comoros

Events in the year 2015 in the Comoros.

== Incumbents ==
- President: Ikililou Dhoinine

== Events ==
- 25 January – Legislative elections were held in the country alongside local elections. A second round of voting was held on 22 February in the 21 constituencies where no candidate won in the first round. The Union for the Development of the Comoros emerged as the largest party, winning eight of the 24 seats in the Assembly of the Union.

== See also ==
- List of years in the Comoros
