= 2018 Comorian constitutional referendum =

30 July 2018
- Do you approve of the draft revision of the Constitution of December 23, 2001, revised in 2009 and 2013?

Results
Choice	Votes	%
Yes	155,734	92.34%
No	12,925	7.66%
Valid votes	168,659	89.36%
Invalid or blank votes	20,091	10.64%
Total votes	188,750	100.00%
Registered voters/turnout	301,006	62.71%

A constitutional referendum was held in the Comoros on 30 July 2018. The constitutional amendments proposed would, among other changes, remove the presidential term limits and requirement for the presidency to rotate between the three main islands. Following the approval of the amendments by 92% of voters, President Azali Assoumani will be allowed to run for another five-year term in a vote moved forward to 2019 instead of 2021.

== Results ==
Choice	Votes	%
For	155,734	92.34
Against	12,925	7.66
Total	168,659	100.00
Valid votes	168,659	89.36
Invalid/blank votes	20,091	10.64
Total votes	188,750	100.00
Registered voters/turnout	301,006	62.71
Source: Government of the Comoros
