= International Islamic Trade Finance Corporation =

- Type: Trade finance, trade promotion
- Industry: Finance, Member of Islamic Development Bank Group
- Founded: 1429H, 2008G
- Headquarters: Jeddah, Saudi Arabia
- Website: www.itfc-idb.org

The International Islamic Trade Finance Corporation (ITFC) aims to develop and expand intra-Organisation of Islamic Cooperation trade.

== History ==
Since its inception in 1395H (1975G), the aim of the Islamic Development Bank (IDB) has been to improve the lives of ordinary people across the Islamic world by raising economic standards and increasing prosperity within the member countries of the Organisation of Islamic Cooperation (OIC, formerly the Organisation of the Islamic Conference). IDB recognized that this goal could be achieved by advancing trade within the Islamic world. The development of trade between OIC member countries is fundamental to this process.

The first formal proposal was made by the Custodian of the Two Holy Mosques during the 10th OIC Summit held in Putrajaya, Malaysia in 1424H (2003G) and supported the following year by the United Arab Emirates at an IDB Board of Governors Meeting in Iran. The ITFC was mandated to streamline and consolidate operations within the IDB that had been carried out through multiple programs under the Bank's Trade Finance and Promotion Department (TFPD).

A substantial amount of the trade finance activities was carried out through what was then referred to as the Import Trade Financing Operations Program (ITFO); which was commenced soon after the establishment of IDB, in 1977G, to finance the import financing needs of the member countries. In 1987G, the Export Financing Scheme (EFS) was established to complement the ITFO and help promote exports of the member countries.

In 1998, IDB took on management of another trade finance program established in cooperation with the Arab Bank for Economic Development in Africa (BADEA), to finance the exports of Arab League member countries to non-Arab League member countries of the African Union. On the other hand, several entities in the IDB Group such as the Islamic Bank's Portfolio for Investment & Development (IBP), the Unit Investment Fund (UIF), the Islamic Corporation for the Development of the Private Sector (ICD) and the Awqaf Properties Investment Fund (APIF) were also engaged in trade finance activities. All intra-trade finance programs operational within the IDB were to be incorporated into the proposed corporation.

The creation of the ITFC was approved in Jumada Al-Awal 1426H (June 2005G) by the Board of Governors of the IDB Group at its 30th annual meeting in Malaysia. The corporation's Articles of Agreement were signed the following year in Kuwait. The ITFC became operational on 1st of Muharram, 1429H (January 10, 2008G) and integrated the activities and operations of all the IDB Group's various trade finance programs into its overall operations. The ITFC was formally inaugurated on 29th of Jumada Al-Awal, 1429H (June 3, 2008G) at the IDB's 33rd Annual Board of Governors Meeting held in Jeddah, Saudi Arabia.

== Advancing trade ==
ITFC advances trade by contributing to the development of markets and trading capacities to help all OIC member countries do business more effectively with each other and the rest of the world.

== Improving lives ==
The paramount concern of IDB has been to alleviate poverty and foster the economic development and social progress, particularly for its least developed member countries, through economic development and trade. This humanitarian objective has been at the core of ITFC's formation.

== Examples of actions ==
In July 2012, ITFC signed US$40 million financing agreement with the Government of the Republic of Tajikistan for the imports of gasoline and diesel.

== Trade finance ==
The ITFC's trade finance arm is responsible for providing Shariah-compliant trade financing for both public and private sector entities in the OIC member countries, with a particular focus on financing OIC intra-trade. The ITFC provides direct financing and also works with other international financial institutions to support OIC trade and intra-trade.

As a member of the IDB Group, the ITFC has leverage over government and acts as a facilitator in mobilizing private and public resources to build and develop intra-trade. The ITFC is also able to streamline the trade financing process by issuing an Irrevocable Commitment to Reimburse (ICR) on Letters of Credits (LCs) issued under ITFC approved finance.

== Trade Cooperation and Promotion Program (TCPP) ==
The Trade Cooperation and Promotion Program is the trade promotion arm within the ITFC that aims to promote and enhance intra-trade and trade cooperation among OIC member countries through four business lines: Trade Promotion, Trade Facilitation, Capacity Building and Development of Strategic Commodities.

To this end, the ITFC, through the TCPP, focused on the integration of Trade Promotion Organizations (TPOs) in Islamic countries through skills and knowledge transfer leading to capacity building. By networking TPOs, through ITFC sponsorship of regional and international conferences, intra-trade issues can be addressed and intra-trade development accelerated. TPOs are the best source of information for identifying prospects, obstacles to overcome and solutions to accelerate the development and growth of intra-trade among OIC member countries.

== Main shareholders ==
The IDB holds majority shares while the remaining is owned by the member countries and the financial institutions. The inclusion of member countries as shareholders is necessary to ensure the international status of ITFC.

== ITFC headquarters ==
ITFC headquarters is located in Jeddah, Saudi Arabia and is planning to expand geographically by opening new branches as deemed necessary.

== Recipient countries for ITFC Trade Finance ==
All IDB Group OIC member countries are entitled to benefit from ITFC trade finance. The present membership of the Bank stands at fifty-six countries spreading over four continents, Africa, Asia, Europe and Latin America. In addition, the ITFC may consider non-member countries as eligible recipients in accordance with rules and terms to be approved by ITFC's Board of Directors.

== Goods, commodities and services eligible for financing by ITFC ==
ITFC's trade finance operations cover goods, commodities and services, including raw materials, industrial intermediate goods, agricultural inputs, food items and all other goods of commodities eligible under Sharia.

== See also ==
- Accounting and Auditing Organization for Islamic Financial Institutions
