= Mohamed Ali Soilihi =

Politician in the Comoros

Mohamed Ali Soilihi (born ca. 1950 in Mbeni, Grande Comore) is a Comorian politician from Grande Comore who served as Vice-President of Union of the Comoros for Ministry of Finance, Budget, Foreign Trade and Economy of Comoros. He served in the cabinet of Ikililou Dhoinine from May 2011 to May 2016.

Soilihi was Minister of Production (Agriculture, Livestock, Water and Forests and Fisheries), Rural Development, Industry and Handicrafts, from January 1985 to March 1990. He was Minister of Finance from December 1996 to June 1998. He was the chief of staff to the President of the Republic from July 1998 to January 1999. He was again Minister of Finance from March 2007 to June 2009.

He was also the candidate of Union for the Development of the Comoros for 2016 Comorian presidential election in which he refused to accept his defeat in the election.

He studied agronomy, economics and development at the École Nationale Supérieure Agronomique de Toulouse.

In 2018, Soilihi was charged in relation to the Comoros passport sales scandal. From 21 to 24 November 2022, Mohamed Ali Soilihi was tried for high treason, embezzlement and money laundering of Comorian public funds allegedly diverted from the economic citizenship program. Soilihi was found guilty and sentenced to 20 years in prison.
