= Idi Nadhoim =

Comorian politician

Idi Nadhoim is a politician from Comoros who served as Vice-President of the Comoros.

Nadhoim was born in 1949 on Grande Comore. He has a degree from University of Aix-en-Provence. He was a civil servant.

Nadhoim was one of the two Vice Presidents of Ahmed Abdallah Mohamed Sambi from 26 May 2006 to 26 May 2011. He was concurrently minister of transportation, post, telecommunications, communication and tourism. He founded Orange Party in 2010.
