= Moustadroine Abdou =

Comorian politician (born 1969)

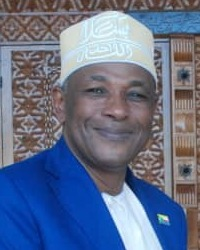
- Abdou in 2022

Speaker of the Assembly of the Union of the Comoros
- Incumbent
- Assumed office 3 April 2020
- Preceded by: Abdou Ousseni

Acting President of Comoros
- In office 13 February 2019 – 3 April 2019
- Vice President: Himself
- Preceded by: Azali Assoumani
- Succeeded by: Azali Assoumani

Vice-President of the Comoros
- In office 26 May 2016 – 26 May 2019

Personal details
- Born: June 14, 1969 (age 57) Sima, Comoros
- Party: Convention for the Renewal of the Comoros
- Education: Agronomic and Veterinary Institute; National School of Rural Engineering, Water Resources and Forestry

Moustadroine Abdou (born 14 June 1969) is a Comorian politician who has been the Speaker of the Assembly of the Union of the Comoros since 2020, as a member of the Convention for the Renewal of the Comoros. Prior to his tenure as speaker he held agricultural positions in Comoros and was Vice-President of the Comoros from 2016 to 2019.

== Early life and education ==
Moustadroine Abdou was born in Sima, Comoros, on 14 June 1969. He graduated with a diploma in forestry or general agronomy from the Agronomic and Veterinary Institute in Morocco on 30 July 1994, and the National School of Rural Engineering, Water Resources and Forestry with an engineer's degree on 20 July 1996.

== Career ==
Abdou was in charge of an agricultural business in Sima from 16 January 1998 to 2001. In the Ministry of Agriculture of Anjouan he was head of the agricultural department from 2 October 2001 to January 2003. From 10 January 2004 to June 2005, he was Secretary of State for Cooperation. He was Commissioner of the Republic for Anjouan from 18 July 2005 to April 2006.

On 26 May 2016, Abdou was appointed as the Vice-President of the Comoros in charge of the Ministry of Agriculture, Fisheries, the Environment, Regional Planning and Urban Development.

Abdou is the regional secretary of the Convention for the Renewal of the Comoros (CRC) in Anjouan. He was elected Speaker of the assembly on 3 April 2020, and reelected on 4 April 2025. He attended the inauguration of Masoud Pezeshkian as president of Iran in 2024.

== Political positions ==
Abdou supports Ukraine in the Russo-Ukrainian War.

== Works cited ==
=== News ===
- "Foreign dignitaries arrive in Tehran to attend presidential inauguration". Tehran Times. 29 July 2024. Archived from the original on 2 July 2025.
- Abdou, Moustadroine (25 October 2024). "Comoros supports Ukraine's territorial integrity". Zmina. Archived from the original on 2 July 2025.

=== Web ===
- "Comoros". Inter-Parliamentary Union. Archived from the original on 2 July 2025.
- "Moustadroine Abdou". Comoros. Archived from the original on 15 October 2018.
