= Mohéli =

Autonomous island of the Comoros

Coordinates: 12°15′S 43°45′E

Mohéli Île Autonome de Mohéli Mwali جزيرة موهيلي المتمتعة بالحكم الذاتي
- Autonomous Island of the Union of the Comoros
- Autonomous Island of Mohéli
- Flag

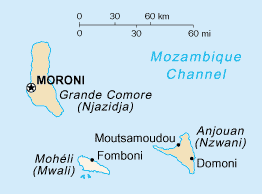
- Mohéli is the lowermost shown of the Comoros islands.

- Mohéli in the Comoros
- Country: Comoros
- Capital: Fomboni

Government
  - Type: Autonomous Island within a presidential republic
  - Governor: Chamina Ben Mohamed

Area
  - Total: 211 km^{2} (81 sq mi)
- Elevation: 790 m (2,590 ft)

Population (2003)
  - Total: 35,400
  - Estimate (2023): 59,527
  - Density: 168/km^{2} (435/sq mi)
- Time zone: UTC+03:00 (EAT)

Mohéli [mɔ.e.li], also known as Mwali, is an autonomously-governed island that forms part of the Union of the Comoros. It is the smallest of the three major islands in the country. It is located in the Indian Ocean off the coast of Africa and it is the smallest of the four major Comoro Islands. Its capital and largest city is Fomboni.

== History ==
Map of Mohéli.

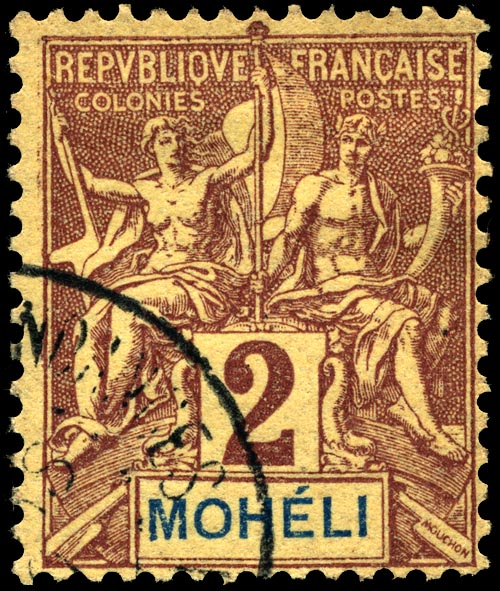
Postage stamps were issued for Mohéli briefly under French rule; this two-centime value dates from 1906.

Until 1830, Mohéli was part of the Ndzuwani Sultanate, which also controlled the neighbouring island of Anjouan. In 1830, migrants from Madagascar led by Ramanetaka, who later changed his name to Abderemane, took over the island and established the sultanate of Mwali. Its ruler was Queen Jumbe-Souli in the mid-nineteenth century. In 1886, France made the island a protectorate.

Until 1889, Mwali had its own French resident, but the island was then subjugated to the residency of Anjouan. The sultanate was dismantled in 1909 following the French annexation of the island. French colonial stamps bearing the inscription "Mohéli" were circulated between 1906 and 1912.

=== Comoros ===
In 1975, Mohéli agreed to join the Comoros nation, along with Grande Comore and Anjouan. Political, economic and social turmoil affected Mohéli and the Comoros in general.

=== Independence ===
On 11 August 1997, Mohéli seceded from the Comoros, a week after Anjouan. Mohéli's secessionist leaders were Said Mohamed Soefu, who became president, and Soidri Ahmed, who became prime minister.

=== Rejoining Comoros ===
Mohéli rejoined Comoros in 1998. In 2002, Mohéli ratified the new Comorian constitution, which provided for a less centralized federal government and more power to the island governments. It helped settle the continuing political turmoil in Comoros and the continuing secessionism on Anjouan. The same year, Mohamed Said Fazul was elected president. His supporters won most seats in Mohéli's delegation to Parliament in the legislative elections of 2004.

== Politics ==
Mohamed Said Fazul was elected president of Mohéli in 2002 against Mohamed Hassanaly.

The legislative assembly of the autonomous island of Moheli has ten seats and was elected on 14 and 21 March 2004. Nine seats were won by the supporters of Said Mohamed Fazul, and the last by a supporter of Azali Assoumani. In 2007, Mohamed Ali Said was elected president of the autonomous island of Moheli (currently president instead of governor) against Said Mohamed Fazul.

After shortening his two-year term, which was to end in 2012, due to problems with the electoral calendar, Mohamed Ali Said was re-elected governor of the autonomous island of Moheli in December 2010 against the presidential majority candidate Said Ali Hilali. The election of the island's councillors was won by an absolute majority by Mohamed Ali Said's camp.

Following the legislative and communal elections held in 2015, it was Governor Mohamed Ali Said's party that won the majority in the island assembly, allying with the councillors (equivalent to deputies at the national level) of those of President Ikililou's supporters and related parties (UPDC party).

In May 2016, following the island governors' elections, it was Mohamed Said Fazul who won against President Ikililou's wife (Hadidja Dhoinine) in the 5-year governorship elections. It is therefore the second time he takes the reins of the island of Moheli.

As a reminder, at the national level, it is the former president (2002-2006) Azali Assoumani who won the elections before Mohamed Ali Soilih. This is his second term (2016-2021) as President of the Union of the Comoros.

== Population ==
Mohéli's population, as of 2006, is about 38,000. Its main ethnic group, as on the other Comoros islands Grande Comore and Anjouan as well as the French territory Mayotte, is the Comorian ethnic group, a synthesis of Bantu, Arab, Malay and Malagasy culture. The main religion is Sunni Islam.

=== Communities ===
- Fomboni - 19,000
- Nioumachoua - 3,400
- Wanani - 2,500
- Djoièzi - 1,636

== Environment ==
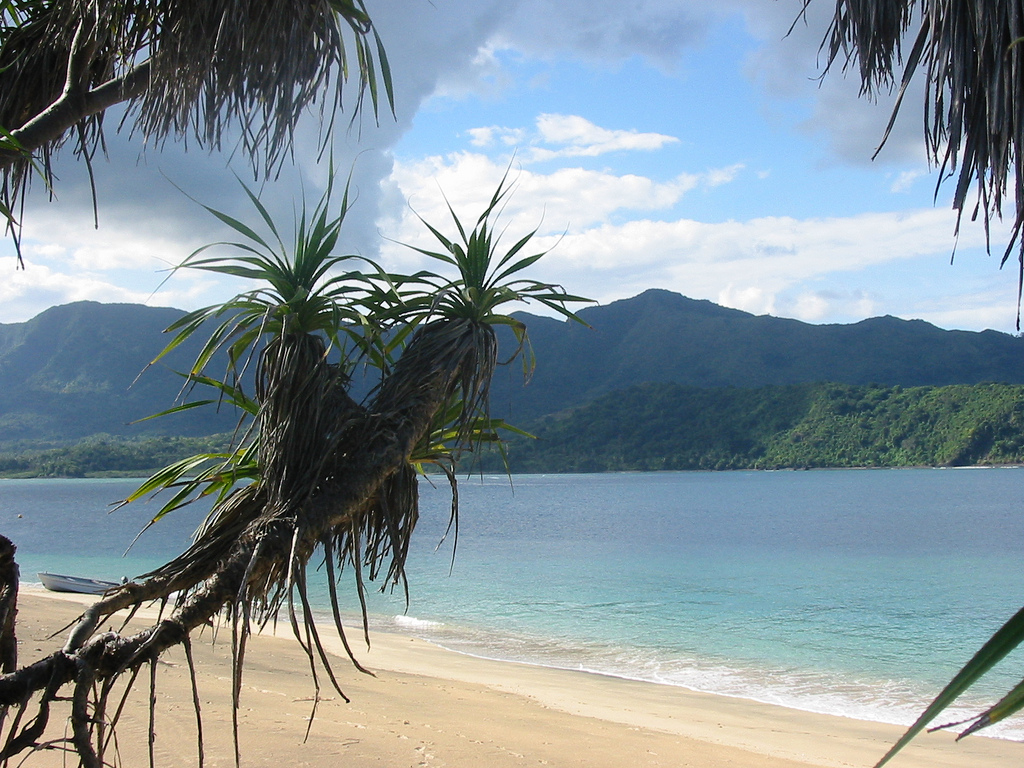
Sable Beach, Mohéli

=== Protected areas ===
On 19 April 2001, the first protected area in this country – Mohéli Marine Park – was gazetted. This was the culmination of a unique process by which the local communities in the ten villages around the park boundaries negotiated a collaborative arrangement with the government for the establishment and management of the park. The marine park programme was among the 27 finalists selected from nearly 500 nominations by the Equator Initiative, a partnership between the United Nations Development Programme (UNDP), IUCN, the UN Foundation and four other international groups, to promote community-based initiatives aimed at furthering sustainable development. The marine park was redesignated Mohéli National Park in 2010, and in 2015 was expanded to include approximately three-quarters of the island's land area.

=== Important Bird Area ===
A 6,268 ha tract encompassing the highlands of the interior of the western part of the island, including Mount Mlédjélé, has been designated an Important Bird Area (IBA) by BirdLife International because it supports populations of Comoro olive pigeons, Comoro blue pigeons, tropical shearwaters, Moheli scops owls, Malagasy harriers, Moheli brush warblers, Moheli bulbuls, Comoro thrushes, Humblot's sunbirds and red-headed fodies.

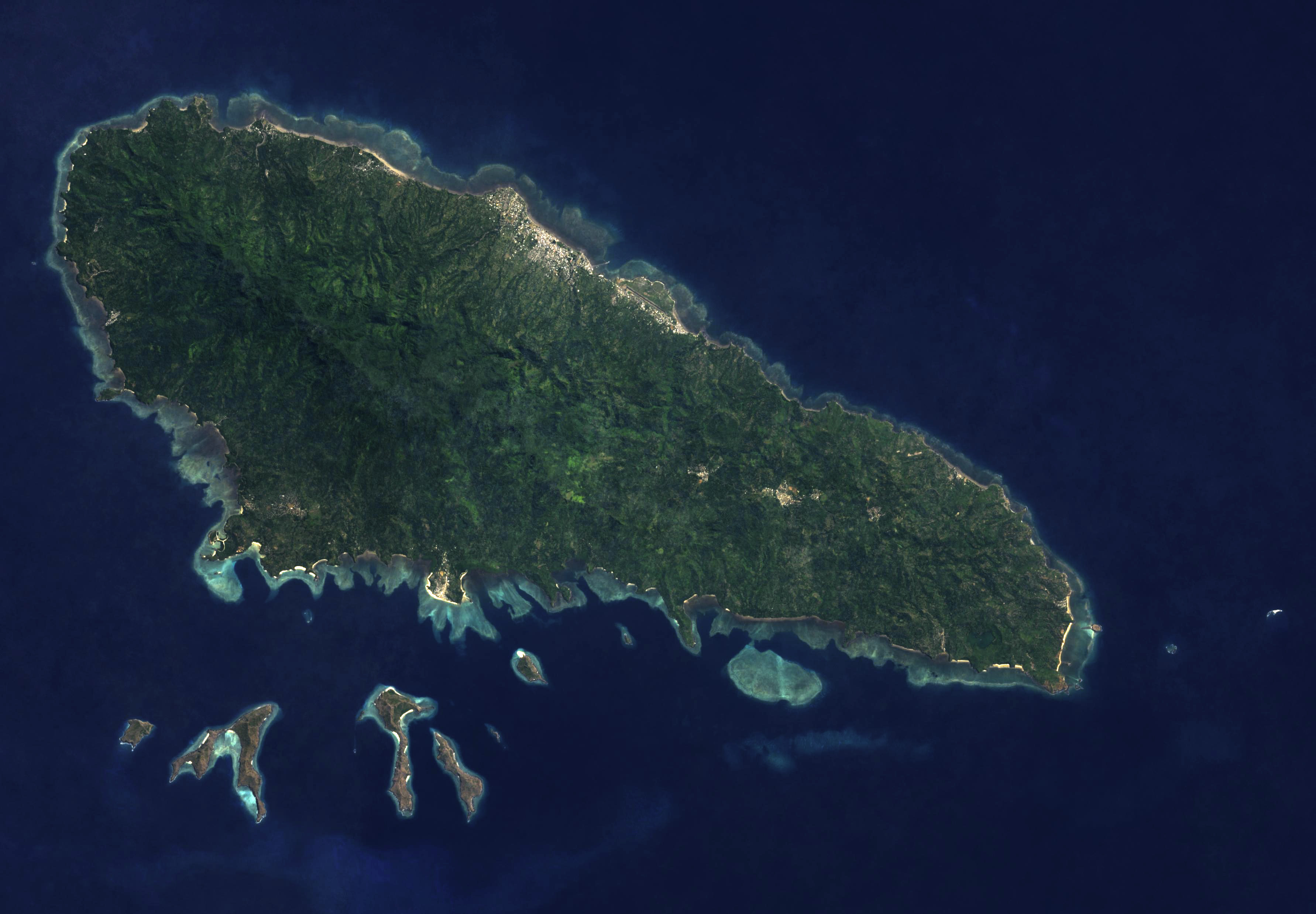
Satellite imagery of Mohéli, 2022.

== Airport ==
Mohéli Bandar Es Eslam Airport, between the villages of Fomboni and Djoièzi on the north coast of the island is the only airport on Mohéli.

== See also ==
- Comoros
