= Comoros passport sales scandal =

Scandal of the sales of Comorian passports

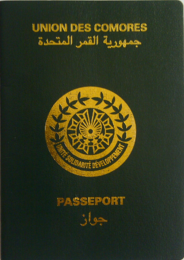
Front cover of a Comorian passport

The Comoros passport sales scandal is a corruption, public funds embezzlement, bribery, and money laundering scheme in connection with a citizenship by investment program launched by the government of the Comoros Islands. Proceeds from the program were intended to finance development in the country but were instead embezzled by the perpetrators of the scheme, which include Syrian fugitive businessman Bashar Kiwan and two former Comorian Presidents.

The 2008 Comoros Economic Citizenship bill that established the citizenship by investment program was originally marketed to the Comoran National Assembly by the perpetrators as an opportunity to draw inbound investment into the Comoros from wealthy Gulf investors, but after its passage was promoted to the governments of UAE and Kuwait as a deal to sell Comoran citizenships en masse so they could be freely distributed among the bedoon (stateless) residents of those countries. Additionally, thousands of passports were alleged to have been sold outside formal channels by 'mafia' networks, to individuals including Iranians who were involved in sectors that had been targeted by international sanctions against Iran, prompting concerns amongst diplomats and security officials in the west that the program was used by Iranians to evade sanctions.

In 2018, the Comoros government announced in an official statement that Comorian citizenship had been sold to 52,000 foreigners, and that the government should have received $260 million in revenues, a sum equivalent to 40% of its gross domestic product. To date, large amounts of cash cannot be accounted for.

The passports were printed in Belgium by Semlex Group, a Belgian biometric document-maker owned and operated by Syrian-Belgian businessman Albert Karaziwan.

The program was suspended by Comoros President Azali Assoumani following his victory in the 2016 Comorian presidential election.

In August 2018, Comoros ex-president Ahmed Abdallah Mohamed Sambi, Syrian-French businessman Bachar Kiwan, and several other associates were formally charged with corruption and embezzling public funds in connection with the Comoros passport sales scheme.

From 21 to 24 November 2022, Ahmed Abdullah Sambi, Bashar Kiwan, Majd Suleiman, and other directors of Comoro Gulf Holdings were tried for high treason, embezzlement and money laundering of Comorian public funds allegedly diverted from the economic citizenship program. Sambi was found guilty and sentenced to life in imprisonment, former Vice President Mohamed Ali Soilihi was sentenced to 20 years, and Bashar Kiwan was sentenced to 10 years.

== Background ==
=== Origin ===
Comoro Gulf Holdings (CGH) and 2008 Comoros Economic Citizenship Law

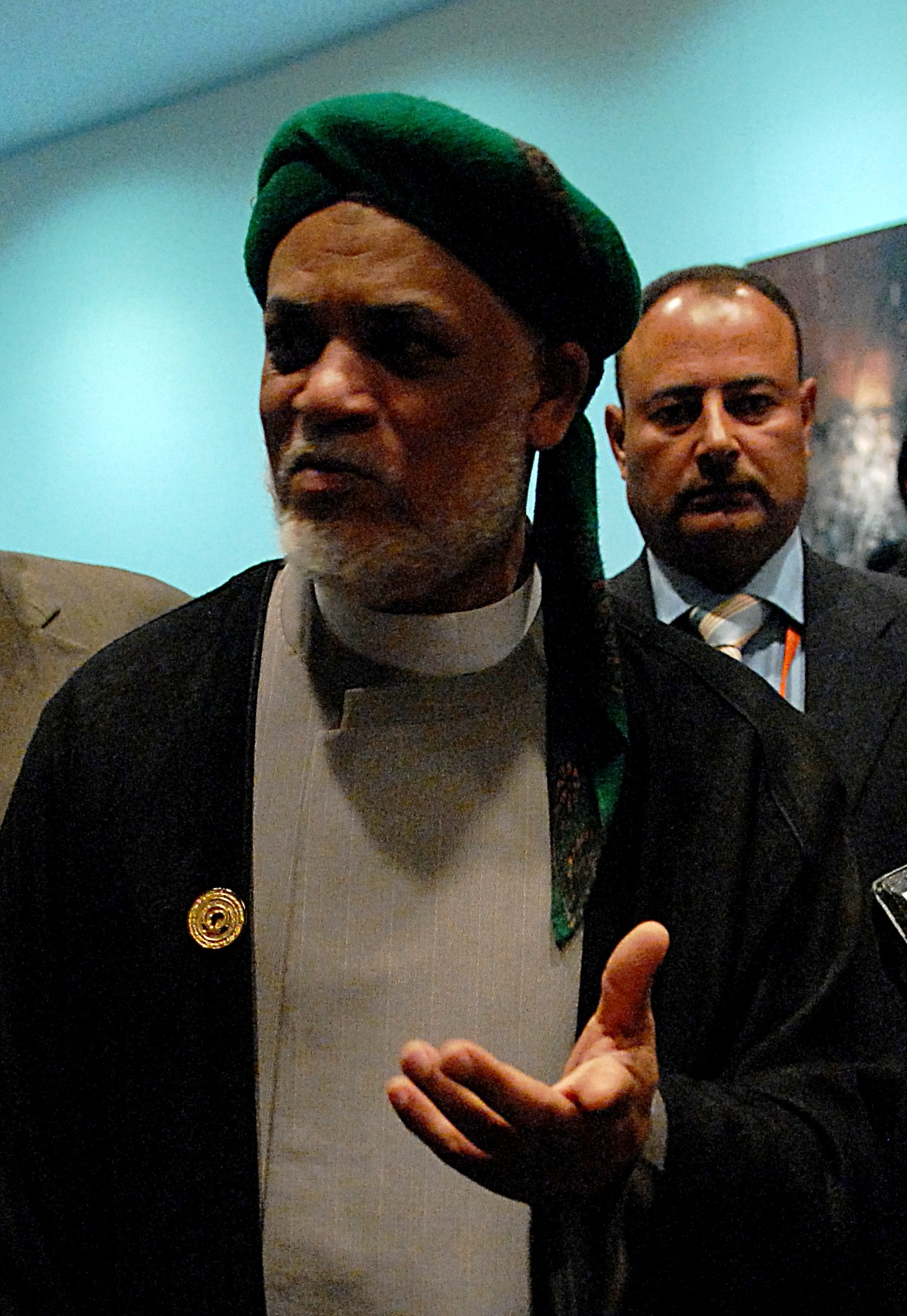
Comoran ex-President (2006-2011) Ahmed Abdallah Sambi

The origin of the Comoros passport sales scheme can be traced to French-Syrian businessman Muhammad Bashar Kiwan, who in 2006 began to lobby the Comoros legislature to enact a controversial citizenship by investment scheme in which his close associate, Comoros ex-President Ahmed Abdallah Sambi would have discretion to grant citizenships. Promises of an investment of more than $100 million on behalf of wealthy Gulf investors were made by Comoro Gulf Holdings (CGH), a Kuwait-registered firm operated by Bashar Kiwan, to sell the legislation to Comoran lawmakers. In 2008, Said Attoumani, the former Comoran minister responsible for promoting foreign investment, praised the expected $100 million from wealthy Gulf investors in support of the prospective law. In a Comoran parliament debate in July 2008, the parliament rejected the proposed economic citizenship law, claiming that it would be equivalent to auctioning off Comorian nationality.

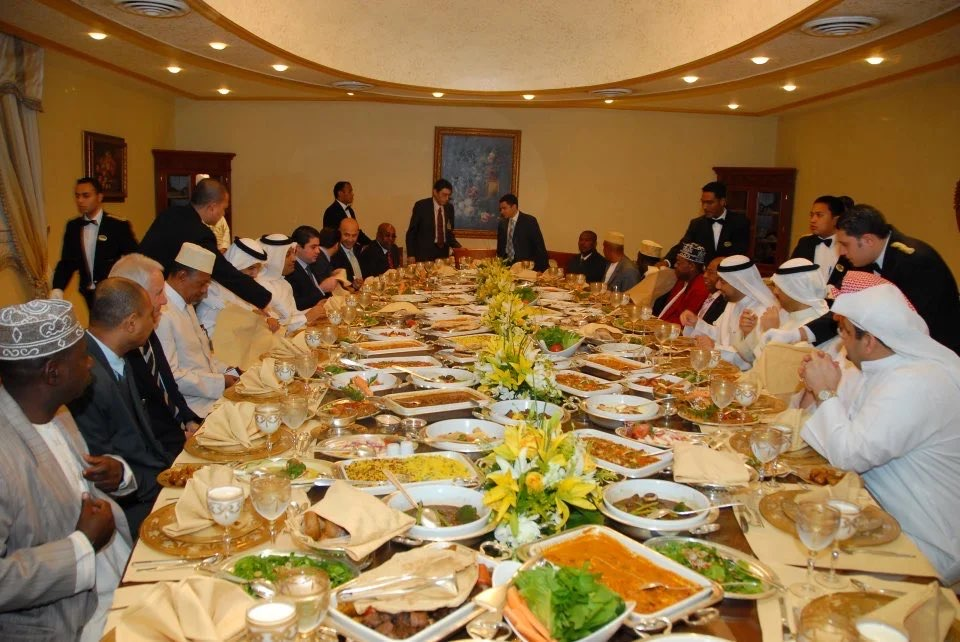
Comoro Gulf Holdings executives Bashar Kiwan, Majd Suleiman, Sheikh Sabah Jaber Mubarak Al-Sabah, and Mohammed Al-Otaibi, pictured during a dinner with members of the Comoran parliament at the Sheraton Hotel, Kuwait City, in October 2008.

The new law was passed in November 2008 after a number of "fact-finding" missions by Comoran politicians to Kuwait and the UAE organized by Comoro Gulf Holdings partners Bachar Kiwan, Majd Suleiman, Sheikh Sabah Jaber Mubarak Al-Sabah and Mohammed Abdulaziz Al-Otaibi, in which "deputies received laptops and other gifts." After passage of the law, the former secretary-general of the Comoros parliament, Aboubacar Said Salim, was hired by Comoro Gulf Holdings (CGH).

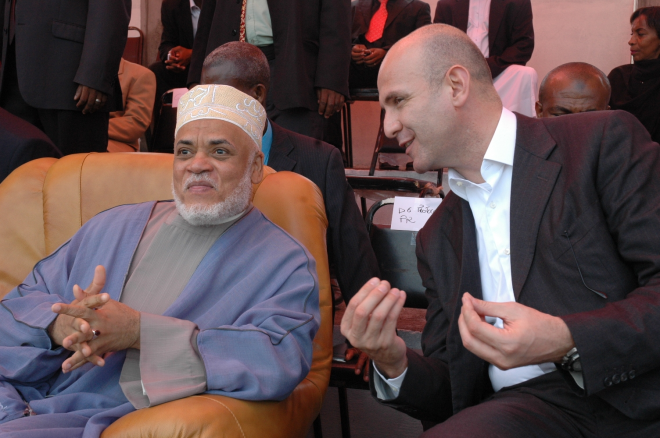
Comoros ex-President Ahmed Abdallah Sambi with French-Syrian businessman Bashar Kiwan at the Said Mohamed Cheikh stadium in 2009

In a 2009 leaked diplomatic cable, US diplomatic officials in Comoros asked their colleagues in the Gulf for more information on Bachar Kiwan, whose company, Comoro Gulf Holdings (CGH) "actively and openly lobbied for a controversial 'economic citizenship law' that appeared to be rejected, then was passed at the National Assembly."

The US cable added:

"Taken at face value, CGH is a limited-funding promoter with a long-term vision of the Comoros as a Gulf tourist destination. Given years of stagnant economic growth, it is unsurprising that President Sambi's government would welcome these investors. Even the active promotion to force through the economic citizenship law could be viewed in terms of investment promotion and assurances. Still, something does not add up and it is worth investigating whether CGH's growing influence in the Comoros is completely benign."

Ahmed Abdallah Sambi worked closely with Comoro Gulf Holdings (CGH) during his presidency (2006 - 2011), during which the company monopolized investment and development in Comoros, controlling major portions of the media, banking, tourism, travel and construction industries. In 2007, Sambi appointed Kiwan to the post of Honorary Consul of Comoros for Kuwait.

=== Sales ===
==== The Bedoon ====
After passage of the economic citizenship law, Bachar Kiwan marketed the opportunity to purchase Comorian passports en masse to the governments of Kuwait and the UAE, for distribution to their local Bedoon (stateless resident) populations. According to ex-President Ahmed Abdallah Sambi, the UAE pledged to $200 million in exchange for the naturalisation of 4,000 Bidoon families who would obtain Comorian citizenship documents. In 2014, Mazen Al-Jarrah Al-Sabah, assistant undersecretary for citizenship and passport affairs at the Kuwaiti Ministry of Interior announced in an interview that the Kuwaiti government was negotiating with Comoros to offer its Bedoon citizenship in exchange for economic benefits. He said that the process would start as soon as a Comoros embassy was opened in Kuwait in the next few months. The plan was ultimately scrapped after being criticized by Kuwaiti lawmakers.

==== Iran ====
Comoros passports bought by Iranians
- Year: Number issued
2008	1
2009	66
2010	77
2011	332
2012	279
2013	385
2014	45
2015	4

According to documents reviewed by Reuters, more than 300 Comoros passports were sold to Iranians while Ahmed Abdallah Sambi was president. Under his successor, Ikililou Dhoinine, passport sales to Iranians continued. Comoran Foreign Minister Souef Mohamed El Amine said that the "vast majority of people who secured passports (outside the official program) are of Iranian origin or are working for Iran," a situation which had "created problems for Comoros with regard to our partners in the Gulf, especially Saudi Arabia and the United Arab Emirates".

=== Parliamentary inquiry ===
In 2016, Azali Assoumani was elected president and in 2017 set up a parliamentary commission of inquiry to investigate the program providing citizenship to the UAE and Kuwait for the Bidoon. The commission summoned Albert Karaziwan, the owner and CEO of Semlex Group, the company that had printed the Comoran passports in September 2017, hoping he would give evidence. Semlex said Karaziwan would be available for questioning in November, but he did not attend for questioning. In 2018, the commission published a report that found that the UAE had informed the Comoros authorities in 2013 that hundreds of passports had been sold outside the Bidoon program. The report accused former Comoran presidents Ahmed Abdullah Sambi and Ikililou Dhoinine with "involvement in systematic fraud" and called for criminal action against the pair. The report claimed that thousands of passports had been sold outside official channels by 'mafia networks' and up to $100 million in revenues from the sale of passports was not received by the government and had gone missing. The report also claimed Ahmed Abdullah Sambi and Bachar Kiwan embezzled $105 million and $29 million respectively from the passport sales scheme. The state was found to have suffered $971 million in lost revenue due to mismanagement and corruption, about 80% of gross domestic product.

According to Foreign Minister Souef Mohamed El Amine:

"There was money that never reached the treasury. We need the money back from the people who profited – including the foreigners."

The parliamentary inquiry found that more than 2,800 Comoros diplomatic passports had been issued since 2008, which was unusually high for a country with a population of about 800,000. In the same period, at least 184 diplomatic passports were sold to non-Comorans.

== Prosecution ==
In January 2018, Belgian police searched the headquarters of Semlex Group in Brussels, as well as the home of Albert Karaziwan. A spokesman for the Belgian federal prosecutor said the searches were in connection to a case of possible money laundering and corruption. In May 2018, Comoros law enforcement officials raided the offices of Semlex Group in Comoros as part of their investigation into passport sales. The parliamentary inquiry had concluded that former president Sambi's nephew "was able to go and print as many passports as he wanted" at Semlex's printing facility in Belgium.

In August 2018, Comoros authorities charged former president Ahmed Abdullah Sambi and Bachar Kiwan with corruption, embezzlement of public funds and forgery related to the sales of Comoros passports. Sambi was jailed, and in September 2018 appealed to the Supreme Court to be granted unrestricted access to his lawyer to defend himself in the corruption case.

From 21 to 24 November 2022, Ahmed Abdallah Sambi, Mohamed Ali Soilihi, Bashar Kiwan, Majd Suleiman, and other directors of Comoro Gulf Holdings were tried for high treason, embezzlement and money laundering of Comorian public funds allegedly diverted from the economic citizenship program. Sambi was found guilty and sentenced to life in imprisonment, former Vice President Mohamed Ali Soilihi was sentenced to 20 years, and Bashar Kiwan was sentenced to 10 years.
