= Corruption in the Comoros =

Corruption in the Comoros follows the familiar patterns of state-based corruption, namely government officials abusing their political powers for private gain in the country of Comoros.

On Transparency International's 2025 Corruption Perceptions Index, the Comoros scored 20 on a scale from 0 ("highly corrupt") to 100 ("very clean"). When ranked by score, the Comoros ranked 163rd among the 182 countries in the Index, where the country ranked first is perceived to have the most honest public sector. For comparison with regional scores, the best score among sub-Saharan African countries (Note: Angola, Benin, Botswana, Burkina Faso, Burundi, Cameroon, Cape Verde, Central African Republic, Chad, Comoros, Côte d'Ivoire, Democratic Republic of the Congo, Djibouti, Equatorial Guinea, Eritrea, Eswatini, Ethiopia, Gabon, Gambia, Ghana, Guinea, Guinea-Bissau, Kenya, Lesotho, Liberia, Madagascar, Malawi, Mali, Mauritania, Mauritius, Mozambique, Namibia, Niger, Nigeria, Republic of the Congo, Rwanda, Sao Tome and Principe, Senegal, Seychelles, Sierra Leone, Somalia, South Africa, South Sudan, Sudan, Tanzania, Togo, Uganda, Zambia, and Zimbabwe.) was 68, the average was 32 and the worst was 9. For comparison with worldwide scores, the best score was 89 (ranked 1), the average was 42, and the worst was 9 (ranked 181, in a two-way tie).

== Cases ==
=== Comoros passport sales scandal ===
The Comoros Island passport sales scheme was created in 2006 by former businessman Bashar Kiwan and the then president of the Comoros Abdallah Sambi and stayed on course with his successor Ikililou Dhoinine.

The citizenship by investment program was presented as a bilateral solution to achieve the dual objectives of developing the infrastructure of the Comoros Islands and "solving" the stateless resident issue in the Arab states of the Persian Gulf. Specifically, it would allow the United Arab Emirates and Kuwait to purchase citizenship for 4,000 stateless families in those countries, known as Bidoon, in return the poor Indian Ocean archipelago would receive $200 million to be spent on development projects. However, Kiwan and the entourage of both former presidents embezzled more than $45 million of funds as the country saw no money that went towards any development plan to better the country. It was also discovered that passports were sold through unofficial channels to any individual at the right price.

The official database showed that nearly 48,000 foreigners – including mostly Bidoons - received passports, about 6,000 more than the official number approved by the president, highlighting the scale of sales outside the official channels. The first phase of the scheme, under Sambi, who was in power from 2006 to 2011, was meant to earn Comoros $200 million in return for giving citizenship to 4,000 stateless families. Emirati officials have stated that they had paid the money in full but the report said there was little trace of the money in Comoros public accounts.

In August 2018, Comoros authorities charged former president Ahmed Abdullah Sambi, Ikililou Dhoinine, Bachar Kiwan and other directors of Comoro Gulf Holdings, the company that facilitated passport sales, with corruption, embezzlement of public funds and forgery related to the sales of Comoros passports. Sambi was jailed, and in September 2018 appealed to the Supreme Court to be granted unrestricted access to his lawyer to defend himself in the corruption case. Major-General Mazen Al-Jarrah, Kuwait's former interior ministry assistant undersecretary who had announced the Comoros Islands scheme in Kuwait, was subsequently convicted in February 2021 for receiving bribes for facilitating human trafficking.

From 21 to 24 November 2022, Ahmed Abdullah Sambi, Bashar Kiwan, Majd Suleiman, and other directors of Comoro Gulf Holdings were tried for high treason, embezzlement and money laundering of Comorian public funds allegedly diverted from the economic citizenship program. Prosecutors sought a life sentence for the former president and his accomplices. Sambi was found guilty and sentenced to life in imprisonment, former Vice President Mohamed Ali Soilihi was sentenced to 20 years, and Bashar Kiwan was sentenced to 10 years.
