= Comorian nationality law =

Comorian Nationality Code

Assembly of the Union of the Comoros
- Long title: Code de la nationalité comorienne, Loi No. 79-12 du 12 décembre 1979
- Enacted by: Government of the Comoros
- Status: Current legislation

Comorian nationality law is regulated by the Constitution of the Comoros, as amended; the Comorian Nationality Code, and its revisions; and various international agreements to which the country is a signatory. These laws determine who is, or is eligible to be, a national of the Comoros. The legal means to acquire nationality, formal legal membership in a nation, differ from the domestic relationship of rights and obligations between a national and the nation, known as citizenship. Comorian nationality is typically obtained under the principle of jus soli, i.e. by birth in the Comoros, or jus sanguinis, born abroad to parents with Comorian nationality. It can be granted to persons with an affiliation to the country, or to a permanent resident who has lived in the country for a given period of time through naturalization. The country no longer allows for nationality to be acquired through investment.

== Acquisition of nationality ==
Nationality can be acquired in the Comoros at birth or later in life through naturalization.

=== By birth ===
Those who acquire nationality at birth include:

- Children born anywhere who have at least one parent who is a native-born Comorian national;
- Children born in the Comoros to foreigners who are still residing in the islands at majority may obtain nationality of origin by request; or
- Foundlings or orphans discovered in the territory whose parents are unknown.

=== By naturalization ===
Naturalization can be granted to persons who have resided in the territory for a sufficient period of time to confirm they understand the customs and traditions of the society. General provisions are that applicants have good mental and physical health, are of good character, have sufficient means to economically provide for themselves, and have resided in the country for ten years. Besides foreigners meeting the criteria, other persons who may be naturalized include:

- The legal wife of a Comorian national automatically derives her husband's nationality upon marriage;
- The husband of a Comorian national may naturalize after five years of residency in the country;
- Minor children and a wife can be automatically naturalized when their parent or spouse acquires nationality;
- Adoptees who were adopted by a national as a minor can acquire Comorian nationality without a residency period after they have reached the age of majority;
- Persons who have significantly contributed to the artistic, literary, or scientific development of the country can naturalize after five years of residency; or
- A foreigner who has performed exceptional services to the nation can naturalize without meeting residency requirements.

== Loss of nationality ==
Comorian nationals cannot be denaturalized, if they were born in the territory, but they are allowed to renounce their nationality subject to approval by the state for them to do so. Those who have previously renounced their nationality may reacquire it if they are residing in the country, upon investigation of their request. Nationality may be lost in the Comoros for acts of disloyalty, including performing services for the government or military of another nation; for committing crimes, either against the state or ordinary offenses; or for fraud in a naturalization petition.

== Dual nationality ==
Dual nationality has been allowed in the Comoros since 2001; however, the 2001 Constitution and 1979 Nationality Code are in conflict on the topic.

== History ==
=== Islamic states (1100–1841) ===
Among the earliest writings on the history of Comoros is evidence of the arrival of Shirazis, elite Muslims who were fleeing from conflict in southern Persia, to the islands in the tenth and eleventh centuries. Migrations of Shirazis continued through the fifteenth century. Between the thirteenth and sixteenth centuries, extensive trade networks were developed between the peoples living on the Arabian Peninsula, those living on the eastern African coast, and inhabitants on the Indian subcontinent. As settlements grew up, hybrid political systems emerged which combined traditional kinship and clan networks with monarchical power structures. By the end of the fifteenth century, sultanates had been founded, the majority of the free population had been converted to Islam, and the islands were heavily involved in the slave trade. Portuguese explorers sighted the Comoros in 1503 and they built trading and supply stations in nearby Kilwa, Mozambique, and Sofala within four years. According to Pedro Ferreira, the captain at the Portuguese station at Kilwa, in 1506 among the states were the Sultanate of Zoane (1500–1886), also known as the Sultanate of Anjouan/Ndzuwani or by English speakers as Joanna; the Sultanates of Acymae and Lyna; the Sultanate of Maotoe (f. 1515–1841), also known as Mayotte; the Sultanate of Molale, also known as the Sultanate of Mohéli/Mwali; and the Sultanate of Ouzija, also known Comor/Ngazidja, which was divided by the middle of the sixteenth century into twenty separate chiefdoms. (Note: Malyn Newitt, who from 1998 to 2005 was the Charles Boxer Chair of King's College London, noted that until the eighteenth century cartographers believed there were five islands in the Comoros. Lyna, also sometimes styled Alioa, and Acymae are difficult to determine though the other names of the islands given in the sixteenth century resemble their modern names. He also notes that Swahili names for the islands displaced the European names in the late sixteenth century.)

As the islands had no gold, the Portuguese settlers did not attempt to gain domination over them, but instead developed trade links with the Comorian inhabitants. By 1602 Dutch traders were operating in the islands and within twenty years, English merchants established networks as well. Mwali, which had been a tributary state to Ndzuwani in previous centuries, struggled to maintain its independence at the end of the seventeenth century. Faced with external as well as internal strife, as early as 1662, the ruler of Ndzuwani offered his state to Charles II of England and fourteen years later repeated the offer including at that time Mwali. Ndzuwani used its ties with the British to acquire ships to invade Mwali, and reestablished its authority only to lose it again in 1743, when Mwalian forces defeated Ndzuwani invaders. Inter-island disputes were common in the eighteenth century, but were usually fueled by economic interests rather than sovereignty. Ndzuwani also attempted to extend its authority over Mayotte. The ruler of Mayotte in 1781 refused to pay tribute and open rebellion ensued. Ngazidja was unlikely to have been a tributary state for Ndzuwani, as in the seventeenth century there was no centralized sultanate. As had been the case in earlier centuries, it was divided into ten chiefdoms, in which fighting between local clans and rulers was common.

Repeatedly, through the middle of the eighteenth century, the island's leaders asked England, France and Portugal to provide them with protection from slave raiders, pirates, and other states. The French need for labor on the Mascarene Islands fueled raids of the Comoros. At the end of the Napoleonic Wars (1803–1815), Britain turned away from the Comoros islands, focusing on its new territorial acquisitions of the Cape Colony and Mauritius, though in 1820, Britain secured an anti-slavery agreement with the Merina Kingdom, effectively ending the threat to Comoros. The slave raids had destroyed the economy, destabilizing trade networks and forcing people to flee the islands. Villages were depopulated and those who were left were unable to grow sufficient food to sustain themselves, or produce surplus for trade. The loss of Mauritius, turned French attentions toward the Comoros and the potential to use the large lagoon on Mayotte as a naval station. In 1835, Sultanate of Ndzuwani subjugated the Sultanate of Mayotte, establishing qadis to administer the territory. Constant threat of invasion by Ndzuwani and unrest on Mayotte, led to appeals for the French to help.

=== French colonial period (1841–1975) ===
In 1841, Andriantsuli, the sultan of Mayotte, ceded his island to the French and in 1843, an official protectorate was established. That year, Nossi-bé, now part of Madagascar, was incorporated into the Mayotte Protectorate and would remain until made a separate colony in 1878. In 1847, slavery was abolished in Mayotte and replaced by an indenture system, which differed from the previous labor system only in name. France extended the protectorate to the adjoining islands incorporating the Sultanate of Andruna in 1852, and the Sulatanates of Bambao and Itsandra on Ngazidja, Mwali, and Ndzuwani in 1886. In 1887, the name of the protectorate was changed to Comoros and the Sultanate of Moroni was incorporated into it in 1893. In 1908, the Comoros was made a dependent territory of Madagascar and in 1914 was established as a colony. The Colony was still administrated from Madagascar until 1925, when Comoros was granted local administration, though it was still officially a province of Madagascar.

In 1848, slavery was abolished throughout the French Empire and the Civil Code was extended to all of the French citizens in the colonies. Under the Civil Code, women were legally incapacitated and paternal authority was established over their children. Upon marriage, a woman married to a French man automatically acquired the same nationality as her spouse. Illegitimate children were barred from inheritance and nationality could only be transmitted through a father. Non-citizen nationals were governed by traditional laws concerning marriage and inheritance which placed the well-being of the community above individual rights. These laws prevented a wife from being treated as a slave, required her husband to support her, and entitled her kin to a bride price, to compensate them for the loss of her fertility to their kinship group and secure the legality of the union. Having paid the price for the marriage contract, she and her offspring belonged to the kinship network of her husband and could be inherited if her husband died. The French Nationality Law of 1889 codified previous statutory laws, changing the French standard from jus sanguinis to jus soli and was extended to the French West Indies. Under its terms, women who would become stateless by the rule to acquire their spouse's nationality were allowed to retain their French nationality upon marriage. The Nationality Law was modified in 1897 when it was extended to the remainder of the French colonies. Clarification in the 1897 decree included that bestowing nationality by birth in French territory only applied to children born in France, restoring descent requirements for the colonies.

Under the Code de l'indigénat (Code of Indigenous Status) promulgated for Algeria in 1881 and extended to the Comoros Protectorate in 1901, nationals in the new colonies followed customary law. Following the end of World War I France passed a law, "Décret N°. 24 on 25 March 1915 that allowed subjects or protected persons who were non-citizen nationals and had established domicile in a French territory to acquire full citizenship, including the naturalization of their wives and minor children, by having received the cross of the Legion of Honor, having obtained a university degree, having rendered service to the nation, having attained the rank of an officer or received a medal from the French army, who had married a Frenchwoman and established a one-year residency; or who had resided for more than ten years in a colony other than their country of origin. In 1927, France passed a new Nationality Law, which under Article 8, removed the requirement for married women to automatically derive the nationality of a husband and provided that her nationality could only be changed if she consented to change her nationality. It also allowed children born in France to native-born French women married to foreigners to acquire their nationality from their mothers. When it was implemented it included Guadeloupe, Martinique and Réunion but was extended to the remaining French possessions for French citizens only in 1928. Under Article 26 of the 1928 decree was the stipulation that it did not apply to natives of the French possessions except Algeria, Guadeloupe, Martinique, and Réunion. A decade later, the legal incapacity of married women was finally invalidated for French citizens.

At the end of World War II, a statute issued on 7 March 1944 granted French citizenship to those who had performed services to the nation, such as serving as civil servants or receiving recognitions. The Constitution of 1946 granted French citizenship to all subjects of France's territories without having to renounce their personal status as natives. Under its terms, Comoros was classified as an Overseas Territory within the French Union and officially detached from Madagascar. In 1945, a new Code of French Nationality was passed, which conferred once again automatic French nationality on foreign wives of French men, but allowed mothers who were French nationals to pass their nationality to children born outside of France. It expressly applied to Algeria, French Guiana, Guadeloupe, Martinique and Réunion and was extended to the Overseas Territories in 1953, but in the case of the latter had distinctions for the rights of those who were naturalized. With the passage of the 1958 French Constitution, nationality provisions were standardized for France, Overseas Departments, and Overseas Territories. Article 86 excluded the possibility for independence of the colonies. The French Constitution was amended on 1960 to allow states to maintain membership in the Community even if they were independent republics.

In 1961, the independence movement of the previous decade resulted in the Comoros being granted internal autonomy and the capital being moved from Mayotte to Moroni on Ngazidja. In a meeting between Saïd Mohamed Cheikh, president of the Governing Council of the Comoros Chamber of Deputies, and French President Charles De Gaulle in January 1963, Cheikh was advised that if Comoros chose independence, French financial aid might no longer be forthcoming. With that in mind, Cheikh agreed to stop pushing for independence, but that did not stop student and political demonstrations which demanded decolonization. Cheikh's death in 1970, brought Ahmed Abdallah to the presidency of the council and renewed the press for independence. On 22 December 1974 a plebiscite was held with Mayotte voting to retain its status as a French overseas territory and 96% of the combined voters on Mwali, Ngazidja, and Ndzuwani in favor of independence. France's response to the result was that they would allow independence as long as a constitution was drawn up and all four islands agreed to it in a plebiscite. Abdallah, fearing that Mayotte would not agree, declared the independence of the islands on 5 July 1975.

=== Post-independence (1975–2008) ===
On 30 December 1975, the French Constitutional Council established that legal obstacles did not preclude partial independence, and formally recognized the Comorian state composed only of Mwali, Ngazidja, and Ndzuwani. A second referendum held for Mayotte on 9 February 1976 had the same result as the previous plebiscite. In 1977, the country drafted its first constitution, but a coup d'état the following year, led to it being replaced on 5 October 1978. In 1979, the Nationality Code (Loi No. 79-12) was adopted and as of 2019 was still in force. In 2001, a constitutional revision allowed for dual nationality. There are conflicts between the constitutional provisions and the stipulations in the Nationality Code. For example, the Nationality Code provides that holding multiple nationalities, or exercising rights in another nation are grounds for denaturalization, but the 2001 Constitution states that one cannot be deprived of their nationality of birth for having obtained another nationality and its benefits.

=== Passport sales scheme (2008–2018) ===
Under a law (French: Loi relative à la citoyenneté économique en Union des Comores) enacted in 2008, persons who made a significant investment into the development of the country could obtain nationality and a Comorian passport. The program was initially designed in conjunction with the United Arab Emirates to exchange nationality for stateless Bidoons for investment in Comoros. The scheme required investment of $45,000 US for the primary applicant; $20,000 US for a spouse or adult child; $10,000 US for minor children; $300 US for each passport; and $7,500 US for processing fees. In 2014, Kuwait announced it was in negotiations with to join the program, but the plan was scrapped in 2016 after being criticized by Kuwaiti lawmakers. A parliamentary investigation was conducted between June and December 2017 finding that the initial legislation lacked proper signatures and stamps and was not logged in the statues of the nation; some nationality documents were granted to persons who did not meet the program parameters; and there were financial discrepancies in the number of persons granted nationality and the amount of earnings the government received. The government officially suspended the program in January 2018.

In August 2018, Comoros authorities charged former president Ahmed Abdullah Sambi and Syrian-French businessman Bashar Kiwan with corruption, embezzlement of public funds and forgery related to the sales of Comoros passports. In November 2022, Ahmed Abdallah Sambi, Mohamed Ali Soilihi, Bashar Kiwan, Majd Suleiman, and other directors of Comoro Gulf Holdings were tried for high treason, embezzlement and money laundering of Comorian public funds allegedly diverted from the economic citizenship program. Sambi was found guilty and sentenced to life in imprisonment, former Vice President Mohamed Ali Soilihi was sentenced to 20 years, and Bashar Kiwan was sentenced to 10 years in prison.
