= Bahjat Suleiman =

Former Syrian diplomat and intelligence chief (1949–2021)

- بهجت سليمان

Syrian Ambassador to Jordan
- In office 2009–2014
- President: Bashar al-Assad
- Prime Minister: Riyad Farid Hijab; Wael Nader al-Halqi

Head of the Internal Intelligence Division (251) General Security Directorate
- In office 1998–2005
- President: Bashar al-Assad
- Preceded by: Mohammed Nasif Kheirbek
- Succeeded by: Fouad Nasif Kheir Bek

Personal details
- Born: 1949 Latakia, Syria
- Died: 25 February 2021 (aged 71–72) Damascus, Syria
- Resting place: Saydieh Zainab Martrys Cemetery
- Party: Ba'ath Party
- Children: Majd Suleiman; Haidara Suleiman
- Nickname: Abou Al-Majd

Military service
- Allegiance: Ba'athist Syria
- Branch/service: Syrian Arab Army; Defense Companies
- Years of service: 1968–2007
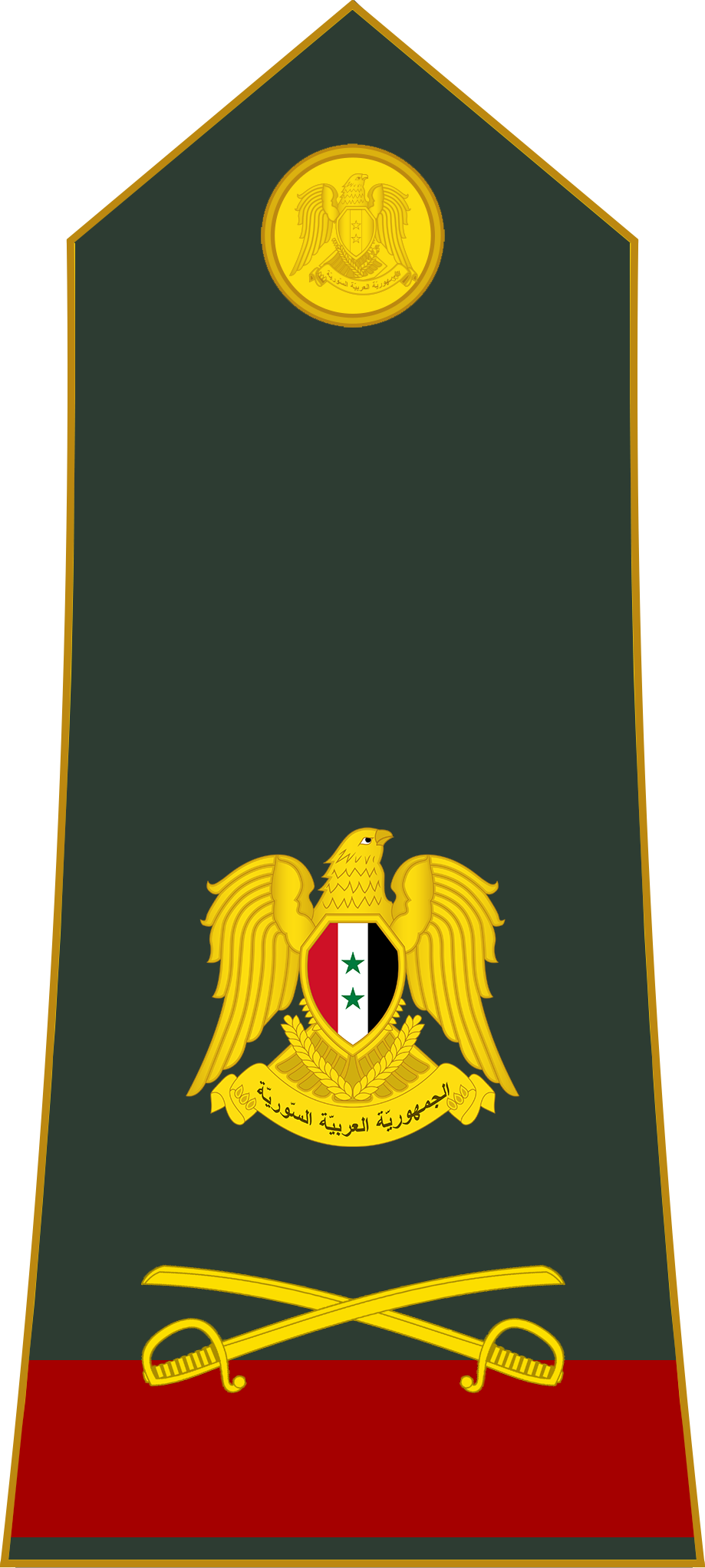
- Rank: Brigadier General
- Unit: Armored Division; Military Intelligence; Internal Intelligence
- Battles/wars: Yom Kippur War; Lebanese Civil War; Syrian intervention; 1982 Lebanon War; Islamist uprising in Syria

Bahjat Suleiman (Arabic: بهجت سليمان; 1949 – 25 February 2021) was a Syrian diplomat and former military officer. He served as the head of the internal branch of the General Intelligence Directorate (GID), also known as Branch 251, in Syria, and was Syria's Ambassador to Jordan from 2009 to 2014. He was instrumental in the accession of Syrian President Bashar al-Assad to the presidency and was considered to be his confidant and mentor, and in his "inner circle."

== Early life and education ==
Bahjat Suleiman was born to an Alawite family in 1949 in the city of Latakia, located in western Syria. He joined the Syrian Army in 1968 and graduated from the Homs Military Academy with a BA in military sciences in 1970. Suleiman held a master's degree in command and staff from the Syrian Command and Staff College and acquired his Ph.D. in Political Economy from Romania.

== Military career ==
He was a company commander, battalion, regiment, and tank brigade in the Defense Companies, the paramilitary force in Syria that was commanded by Rifaat al-Assad, and then in the Syrian Arab Army. While in the Defense Companies, he participated in the Yom Kippur War against Israel 1973 in the northern sector, and then in the 1982 Lebanon War.

== Under Hafez's rule ==
Suleiman began his career as a staunch supporter of Rifaat al-Assad, the uncle of current President Bashar al-Assad, however later switched loyalties to the late Hafez al-Assad. In March 1984, during Rifaat al-Assad's attempted coup d'état, Suleiman as chief of the Defense Companies' security apparatus, sent pertinent intelligence regarding the Defense Companies mobilizations in Damascus to Hafez al-Assad, allowing Hafez to dispatch his own troops to Damascus in time to thwart the coup.

In the years leading to Hafez al-Assad's death, Bahjat Suleiman was responsible for marketing Bashar al-Assad as the "hope" for Syria. When Hafez al-Assad died on June 10, 2000, Bahjat Suleiman publicly pledged support for Bashar al-Assad.

== Media ==
Bahjat Suleiman was the mastermind of the regime's media policies since Assad took power in 1971. His son Majd Suleiman owns United Group (UG), a media conglomerate seen as the media arm of the Assad regime in various Arab countries, with his business partner Muhammad Bashar Kiwan. His younger son Haidara Suleiman is the editor-in-chief of Syrian government-aligned newspaper Baladna, a leading member of the Syrian Electronic Army, and runs Bashar al-Assad's page on Facebook.

Bahjat Suleiman was a leader in the Baath Party and had published many research pieces and publications on former Syrian President Hafez al-Assad and his son, Basil al-Assad. He had his own blog on Facebook, which published his writings, under the name "Swords of Reason with Bahjat Suleiman"

== Controversies ==
=== Implication in Rafic Hariri assassination ===
Bahjat Suleiman was one of several high-ranking Syrian government and military officials named as responsible for the assassination of Rafic Hariri in a draft of the United Nations Mehlis Report that was erroneously released as a Microsoft Word document which preserved changes that had been made in the document since its creation. The official Mehlis Report made no specific mention of anyone in the Syrian government as responsible for the assassination. The Syrian ambassador to Washington, Imad Mustafa, said that the report is "full of political rumors, gossip, and hearsay."

=== Expulsion from Jordan ===
In May 2014, Bahjat Suleiman was expelled from the Hashemite Kingdom of Jordan over "repeated insults" against the kingdom. The Jordanian foreign ministry said it considered Bahjat Suleiman a persona non grata and gave him 24 hours to leave the country. The decision came after Suleiman crashed the Hashemite royal court's Independence Day celebrations, and in response to his "track record of propagandistic social media posts." It said he had made numerous false allegations, accusing Jordan of harbouring Syrian rebels. Syria responded by declaring Jordan's chargé d'affaires in Damascus persona non grata, saying the expulsion of Suleiman was an unjustified move to expel its ambassador.

== Death ==
Bahjat Suleiman died on 25 February 2021, from COVID-19.
