= Lina Chawaf =

Syrian journalist-in-exile

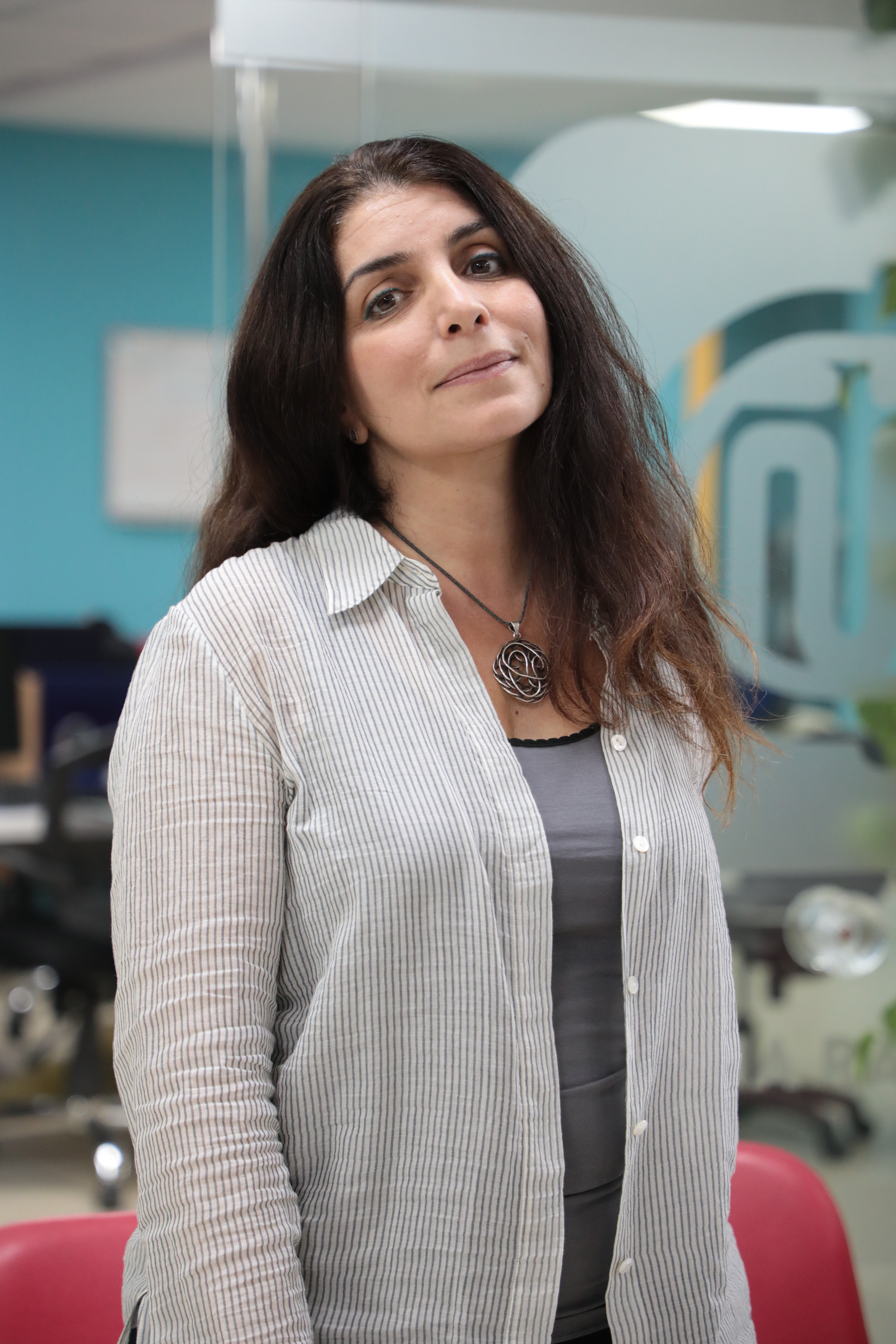
Chawaf in 2019

Lina Chawaf (born 1969 or 1970 (age 55–56)) is a Syrian journalist. She studied fine arts at Damascus University. She began working as a TV director's assistant and then became a director involved in the production of commercials. She has been a journalist since 1992.

She founded the Arabesque Radio 2005 in Syria and managed it for seven years and then Mussika FM radio station 2009. Through Arabesque radio she was discussing many sensitive issues in the society especially women rights, including violence, inequality, injustice, honor crimes. In 2011, the Syrian government required that radio stations broadcast pro-government messaging in response to the Arab Spring. Chawaf and her children were threatened by authorities after refusing, so she went into self-imposed exile. She traveled to Montreal where she lived for nearly two years before settling in Paris.

Chawaf founded Radio Rozana to broadcast citizen journalism into Syria, with the first broadcast taking place on 26 June 2013, initially staffed with 30 reporters on the ground in Syria and five based in Paris. and then later another studio created in Gaziantep in Turkey November 2014. She operates out of an apartment in an undisclosed location in Paris to avoid reprisal from the Syrian government. As of 2014, she was returning to Syria every two years to the opposition areas to report from there. She created many independent free media in conflict areas like Libya, Yemen and Syria. She trained thousand of Arab journalists and media workers. She Coached tenths of media leadership in conflict areas. She is a Public speaker in tenths of conferences, workshops and international events. UNESCO https://www.unesco.org/archives/multimedia/document-4432, ISOJ https://isoj.org/speakers-2025/lina-chawaf/, Radiodays, ARIJ, Arab conference at Harvard. She served as the President of CMFE, advocating for human rights, women’s rights, and freedom of expression through media. In 2018, she was awarded the Press Freedom Award by Reporters Without Borders. She is the director of the European Media Collective Forum "CMFE." She has also written articles for newspapers and magazines in Syria (Baladna, Shabablek, and Sabaya) and in Canada (Almoustakbal) She writes for international media like Washington Post, Globe & Mail, Boston Globe, Nieman reports. She got the Nieman fellowship from Harvard for 2024-2025 to do a research about Female Media leadership in Conflict and write a book about her memoir. https://nieman.harvard.edu/class-of-2025/
