= Comorian passport =

Passport issued to citizens of the Union of the Comoros

- The front cover of a contemporary Comorian passport.
- Type: Passport
- Issued by: Comoros
- Purpose: Identification
- Eligibility: Comorian citizenship

The Comorian passport is issued to citizens of the Union of the Comoros for international travel. As of 1 January 2017, Comorian citizens had visa-free or visa on arrival access to 48 countries and territories, ranking the Comorian passport 88th in terms of travel freedom (tied with Algerian, Cambodian, Egyptian, Guinean and Laotian passports) according to the Henley visa restrictions index.

The UAE and other countries in the Persian Gulf have a partnership with Comoros in which Comoros Islands passports are given to many stateless people (including dissidents).

== The Comoros Island passport sales scheme ==
The Comoros Island passport sales scheme was created in 2006 by former businessman Bashar Kiwan and the then president of the Comoros Abdallah Sambi and stayed on course with his successor Ikililou Dhoinine.

The citizenship by investment program was presented as a bilateral solution to achieve the dual objectives of developing the infrastructure of the Comoros Islands and "solving" the stateless resident issue in the Arab states of the Persian Gulf. Specifically, it would allow the United Arab Emirates and Kuwait to purchase citizenship for 4,000 stateless families in those countries, known as Bidoon, in return the poor Indian Ocean archipelago would receive $200 million to be spent on development projects. However, Kiwan and the entourage of both former presidents embezzled more than $45 million of funds as the country saw no money that went towards any development plan to better the country. It was also discovered that passports were sold through unofficial channels to any individual at the right price.

The official database showed that nearly 48,000 foreigners – including mostly Bidoons - received passports, about 6,000 more than the official number approved by the president, highlighting the scale of sales outside the official channels. The first phase of the scheme, under Sambi, who was in power from 2006 to 2011, was meant to earn Comoros $200 million in return for giving citizenship to 4,000 stateless families. Emirati officials have stated that they had paid the money in full but the report said there was little trace of the money in Comoros public accounts.

Today, Kiwan, Sambi and Dhoinine as well as other official key members of the Comoro government are accused of embezzlement, fraud and misuse of public funds and are calling for criminal action against all involved parties. Major-General Mazen Al-Jarrah, Kuwait's former interior ministry assistant undersecretary who had announced the Comoros Islands scheme in Kuwait, was subsequently convicted in February 2021 for receiving bribes for facilitating human trafficking.

== See also ==
- Bedoon
- Visa requirements for Comorian citizens
- Muhammad Bashar Kiwan
- Comoros passport sales scandal
- Semlex Group
