= Ahmed Ben Said Djaffar =

Comorian politician

Ahmed Ben Said Djaffar is a politician in the Comoros. He is the current foreign minister under Ahmed Abdallah Mohamed Sambi since Sambi's inauguration on 28 May 2006.
