= Visa policy of the Comoros =

Policy on permits required to enter Comoros

- All visitors regardless of nationality to Comoros are required to have a valid visa (unless otherwise exempted).
- Nationals of any country can obtain a visa on arrival for a maximum stay of 45 days at a cost of Euro 30 each.
- All visitors must hold a passport valid for 6 months and return or onward tickets.

== Visa policy map ==
Visa policy of the Comoros The Comoros Visa on arrival

== Visa exemption ==
- Holders of diplomatic, official or service passport of Libya do not require a visa for a maximum stay of 45 days.
- Holders of diplomatic, service passport or passport for public affairs holders of China do not require a visa for a maximum stay of 30 days.

== See also ==
- Visa requirements for Comorian citizens
