= Comoro Gulf Holdings =

Comoro Gulf Holding (CGH)
- Trade name: Comoro Gulf Holdings (CGH)
- Company type: Privately held company
- Industry: Construction; Aviation; Media; Tourism; Banking; Passport sales
- Founded: 2006
- Founder: Mohammed al-Otaibi
- Defunct: 2014
- Fate: Defunct after losses and political scandals
- Area served: Comoros
- Key people: Bachar Kiwan; Majd Suleiman; Sheikh Sabah Jaber Mubarak Al-Sabah; Mohammed Al-Otaibi
- Website: www.comorogulfholding.com

Comoro Gulf Holdings (CGH), sometimes referred to as Comoros Gulf Holding or Comoro Gulf Holding, was an investment company, set up by Syrian businessmen Bachar Kiwan and Majd Suleiman and Kuwaiti businessmen Sheikh Sabah Jaber Mubarak Al-Sabah and Mohammed Abdulaziz Al-Otaibi, that had worked closely with former Comorian president Ahmed Abdallah Mohamed Sambi, and "monopolized investment and development on the islands."

The company ceased operations between 2014 and 2015 following considerable financial losses and the seizure of assets, which were repercussions of the Comoros passport sales scandal and the ensuing change in presidential leadership in the Comoros. Despite this, several affiliates around the world, controlled by its founders Bashar Kiwan and Majd Suleiman, remained active.

== Activities ==
=== 2008 Comoros Economic Citizenship Program ===
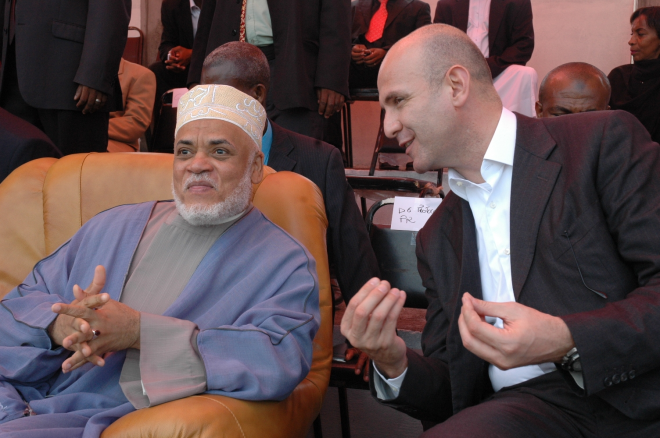
Comoros ex-President Ahmed Abdallah Sambi with Comoro Gulf Holding CEO Bashar Kiwan at the Said Mohamed Cheikh stadium in 2009

In 2006 Bachar Kiwan, the founder of Comoro Gulf Holding (CGH) began to lobby the Comoros legislature to enact a controversial citizenship by investment scheme in which his close associate, Comoros ex-President Ahmed Abdallah Sambi would have discretion to grant citizenships. Promises of an investment of more than $100 million on behalf of wealthy Gulf investors were made by Comoro Gulf Holdings (CGH), to sell the legislation to Comoran lawmakers. In 2008, Said Attoumani, the former Comoran minister responsible for promoting foreign investment, praised the expected $100 million from wealthy Gulf investors in support of the prospective law. In a Comoran parliament debate in July 2008, the parliament rejected the proposed economic citizenship law, claiming that it would be equivalent to auctioning off Comorian nationality.

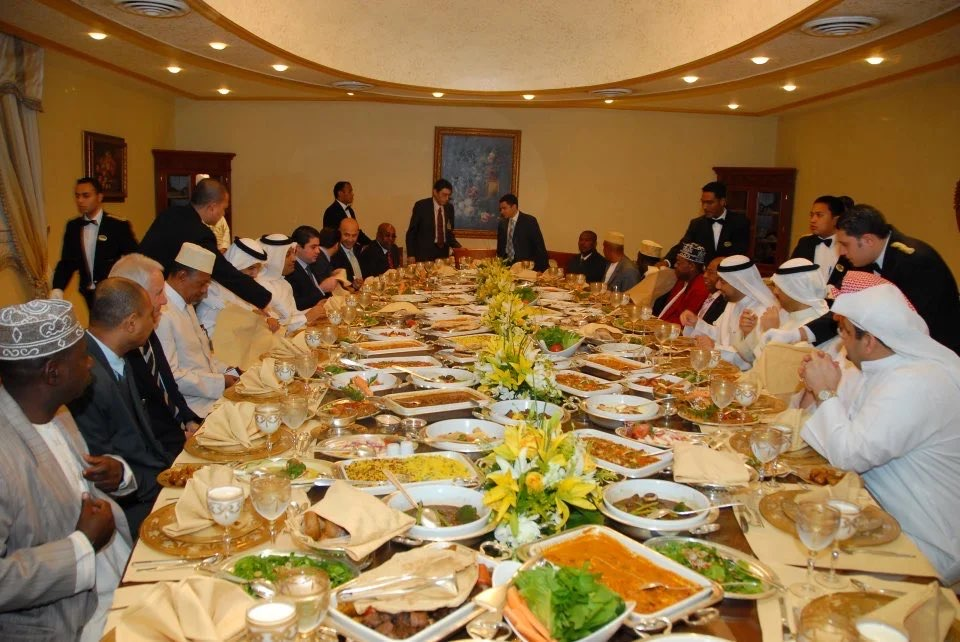
Comoro Gulf Holdings executives Bashar Kiwan, Majd Suleiman, Sheikh Sabah Jaber Mubarak Al-Sabah, and Mohammed Al-Otaibi, pictured during a dinner with members of the Comoran parliament at the Sheraton Hotel, Kuwait City, in October 2008.

The new law was passed in November 2008 after a number of "fact-finding" missions by Comoran politicians to Kuwait and the UAE organized by Comoro Gulf Holdings partners Bachar Kiwan, Majd Suleiman, Sheikh Sabah Jaber Mubarak Al-Sabah, and Mohammed Al-Otaibi in October, in which "deputies received laptops and other gifts." After passage of the law, the former secretary-general of the Comoros parliament, Aboubacar Said Salim, was hired by Comoro Gulf Holdings (CGH).

In a 2009 leaked diplomatic cable, US diplomatic officials in Comoros asked their colleagues in the Gulf for more information on Bachar Kiwan, whose company, Comoro Gulf Holdings (CGH) "actively and openly lobbied for a controversial 'economic citizenship law' that appeared to be rejected, then was passed at the National Assembly."

The US cable added:

"Taken at face value, CGH is a limited-funding promoter with a long-term vision of the Comoros as a Gulf tourist destination. Given years of stagnant economic growth, it is unsurprising that President Sambi's government would welcome these investors. Even the active promotion to force through the economic citizenship law could be viewed in terms of investment promotion and assurances. Still, something does not add up and it is worth investigating whether CGH's growing influence in the Comoros is completely benign."

In April 2015, a Comorian court ruled that Comoro Gulf Holdings owed the state $16 million from the economic citizenship program. In May 2015, the Comorian state ordered the seizure of company assets on the island.

=== Ties to ex-president Ahmed Abdallah Sambi ===
Ahmed Abdallah Sambi worked closely with Comoro Gulf Holdings (CGH) during his presidency (2006–2011), during which the company monopolized investment and development in Comoros, controlling major portions of the media, banking, tourism, travel and construction industries. In 2007, Sambi appointed Kiwan to the post of Honorary Consul of Comoros for Kuwait.

After the 2008 invasion of Anjouan that deposed former President of Anjouan Colonel Mohamed Bacar, posters of Sambi proclaiming that he was the "father of national unity" appeared all over the country, with the Comoro Gulf Holdings logo in the corner. Comoro Gulf Holdings' newspaper, Al-Balad, mostly reprinted pro-Sambi articles and promoted Comoro Gulf Holdings activities. During the fuel shortages that followed the invasion, CGH's bank on the island, Banque Féderale de Commerce, reportedly made $3–5 million in revolving credit available for petroleum imports.

== Affiliated businesses ==
- Banque Féderale de Commerce
- Comoro Gulf Aviation
- Comoros United Company for Publishing and Distributing
- Royal Itsandra Hotel
- United Group (UG)
- Al-Balad

== See also ==
- Muhammad Bashar Kiwan
- Majd Bahjat Suleiman
