= Al-Balad (newspaper) =

Daily newspaper in Lebanon

Al Balad
- Front page of Al-Balad on 4 March 2006
- Type: Daily newspaper
- Format: Tabloid
- Owner(s): Al Waseet International; United Group for Publishing Advertising and Marketing
- Publisher: Al Wataniya
- Founded: 15 December 2003
- Ceased publication: 2018
- Political alignment: Liberal
- Language: Arabic; French
- Headquarters: Beirut, Lebanon
- Sister newspapers: Baladna (Syria)
- Website: www.albaladonline.com

Al-Balad (Arabic: البلد, lit. 'The Country') officially Sada Al-Balad (Arabic: صدى البلد, lit. 'The Echo of the Country') was an Arabic-language daily newspaper in Lebanon. It was headquartered in Beirut and was published as a tabloid commercial paper.

== History ==
Al Balad was first published on 15 December 2003, offering a myriad of prizes to lure subscribers "in exchange for largely insipid centrist news and popular society pages." The first editor-in-chief was Béchara Charbel, a former graphic designer. The first CEO was Bachar Kiwan, one of the owners of the newspaper. The paper had a liberal-centrist stance. In 2004, the newspaper started charging a subscription fee. Soon after, a series of crises (United Nations Security Council Resolution 1559 and the assassination of Rafic Hariri) left Lebanese citizens thirsting for political and security-related news which Al Balad had not provided, which led to the newspaper dismissing its staff and shutting down in 2005.

=== Other editions ===
Al Balad published a French edition in 2008 which lasted for three years before being shut down for financial reasons. Al Balad also published a French edition in the Comoros through United Group (UG) affiliate Comoro Gulf Holding (CGH). In 2008, Al Balad was launched in Kuwait and was subsequently shut down.

== Closure ==
The newspaper reopened in 2010 but shut down again by 2018 after not paying its staff. In 2018, the staff of Al Balad tweeted from the official Twitter account of the newspaper, asking for the restoration of their rights and benefits that were "swindled" from them by the owners of the newspaper, Majd Suleiman and Bachar Kiwan.

Al Balad News
(@AlBaladNewsAR)
tweeted:

Arabic:

موظفو جريدة البلد متكتفون لا حول لهم ولا قوة ينتظرون معجزة الهية ترد حقوقهم التي نصبها عليهم أصحاب الجريدة..والأهم أنهم يتجولون في باريس و دبي غير آبهين بمصير الموظفين..و الدولة في نوم عميق لم تسمع لهم نداء ولا مناجاة ..Bashar Kiwan Majd Suleiman

Translation:

The employees of Al Balad newspaper are bound and helpless, waiting for a divine miracle to restore their [rights/benefits] that the owners of the newspaper swindled from them... and most importantly, they wander around Paris and Dubai, not caring about the fate of the employees... and the State is in a deep sleep, an appeal or plea was not heard from them .. Bashar Kiwan Majd Suleiman

7 October 2018

== Ownership ==
Al Balad is owned by United Group for Publishing and Advertising (through its affiliate Al Waseet International), the Syrian media conglomerate owned by the Syrian businessmen Majd Suleiman and Bachar Kiwan, seen as the media arm of the Assad regime in various Arab countries.

The publisher of the daily was Al Wataniya Publishing House.

== Brand ==
Al Balad's logo, the Arabic letter ب set in white across a red backdrop is identical to the logo of the United Group (UG)'s Syrian newspaper Baladna.

== Circulation ==
In 2006, a study carried out by Ara'a Company with 2,500 participants concluded that Al Balad was read by 18.3% of Lebanese over 15 years of age, being the first in this regard. In the same study it was also found that the paper was the second most popular paper in Lebanon after An Nahar. The Ipsos study in 2006 revealed that Al-Balad had the largest rate of subscribers with 23.8% whereas An Nahar had only 2.6%. The paper was also found to have the highest circulation in Lebanon in 2006. A 2009 survey by Ipsos Stat also established that the daily was among the five most popular newspapers in Beirut.

The paper's online version was the 42nd most visited website for 2010 in the MENA region.

== See also ==
- List of newspapers in Lebanon
