= Semlex Group =

Belgian identification document and device production company

- Industry: IT systems and services, identification systems, secure printing
- Founded: 1992
- Headquarters: Brussels, Belgium
- Key people: Albert Karaziwan (CEO)
- Website: www.semlex.com

Semlex Group, founded in 1992, produces documents and devices for secure identification and offers corresponding services. It is owned and operated by Belgian-Syrian businessman Albert Karaziwan.

It prints the passports of several African and Asian countries, including Azerbaijan, Comoros, Democratic Republic of Congo, Guinea-Bissau, Madagascar and Moldova. Semlex and Karaziwan have been accused of corruption in issuing IDs, gaining contracts through political connections and charging excessive amounts for production of each document to pay off officials.

In 2019, Semlex was awarded the contract to produce national identity cards in Côte d'Ivoire. Semlex reports financing projects in the field of education, notably in the Comoros and Côte d'Ivoire.
