= Albert Karaziwan =

Belgian businessperson

- Born: Albert Mario Karaziwan; 1958; Aleppo, Syria
- Citizenship: Belgium; Syria; Comoros
- Occupation: CEO
- Years active: 1992 - Present
- Known for: Semlex Group
- Website: https://albertkaraziwan.wordpress.com/english/

Albert Karaziwan (born 1958) is a Syrian-Belgian businessman who owns and operates Semlex Group, a Belgian identification document and device production company notable for supplying over a dozen African nations with passports or other ID documents.

== Background ==
Albert Karaziwan was born in 1958 in Aleppo, Syria and is one of eight children. In 1980, he moved to Belgium to study. He began his career in the diamond business in Antwerp, and made his fortune by assisting a Finnish businessman to invest in Brussels real estate. In 1992, he founded Semlex Group in Brussels, and opened a branch in Dublin, Ireland in 1998.

From the early 2000s, Semlex Group won contracts to make biometric documents for governments around the world, including the United Nations, European Union, and international police agencies.

Semlex and Karaziwan have been accused of corruption in issuing IDs, gaining contracts through political connections and charging excessive amounts for production of each document to pay off officials.
