= Baladna =

Syrian newspaper

Baladna بلدنا
- Type: Daily newspaper
- Publisher: United Group for Publishing Advertising and Marketing
- Editor-in-chief: Haidara Bahjat Suleiman
- Political alignment: Pro-government; Ba'athism
- Language: Arabic
- Headquarters: Damascus, Syria
- Country: Syria
- Sister newspapers: Al-Balad (Lebanon)
- Website: Baladna

Baladna (Arabic: بلدنا, lit. 'Our Country') is a privately owned, government-aligned Arabic daily newspaper published in Syria. The paper has also an English edition which was launched in December 2009 but later shut down.

== History and profile ==
The owner and publisher of Baladna is the United Group for Publishing, Advertising and Marketing, the Syrian media conglomerate seen as the media arm of the Assad regime in various Arab countries owned by sons of former intelligence chief Major General Bahjat Suleiman (Majd Bahjat Suleiman and Haidara Suleiman) and Muhammad Bashar Kiwan. Haidara Bahjat Suleiman serves as the editor in chief.

In October 2009, Baladna launched and English edition with a UK-educated chief editor. Since English is not understood by a wide audience in Syria, the aim was to transmit a positive image of Syria to foreign observers and diplomats. The English edition was subsequently shut down.

Baladna is one of two private daily newspapers covering political topics that have succeeded in staying open, due to ownership by businessmen closely tied to the Government of Syria.

In an article published in the paper on 21 February 2012, the newspaper stated that gay Syrians are "social germs ... who have infested our society and took the opportunity to strike once the first signs of weakness appeared," and that the Syrian uprisings "gave homosexuals a freedom they would've never dreamed of" as the Mukhabarat secret police, who would have arrested gays at popular cruising locations, are coping with the uprising now taking up all their time.
