= United Group for Publishing Advertising and Marketing =

Syrian & Arab Media Group

- Trade name: AWI Company; United Group (UG)
- Native name: المجموعة المتحدة للنشر والدعاية والتسويق
- Company type: Public
- ISIN: SY0031100058
- Industry: Media
- Founded: 2000
- Headquarters: Damascus, Syria
- Key people: Haidara Bahjat Suleiman (CEO); Muhamad Saeed Koudmani (chairman)
- Products: Baladna
- Owner: Majid Bahjat Suleiman (66%); Bachar Kiwan (19%); Jad Kiwan (5%); Zina Khair (5%); Jawa Suleiman (5%)
- Website: http://www.ug.com.sy/

United Group for Publishing Advertising and Marketing (Arabic: المجموعة المتحدة للنشر والدعاية والتسويق) also known as United Group (Syria) or United Group (UG), is the largest private sector media group in the Syria.

== Overview ==
United Group (UG) publishes the government-aligned Baladna newspaper in Syria, and published the defunct Al-Balad newspaper in Lebanon, Kuwait, and the Comoros. Baladna is one of two private daily newspapers covering political topics that have succeeded in staying open after the Syrian civil war, due to close ties to the Syrian government.

== Ownership ==
The company is publicly listed on the Damascus Securities Exchange and majority owned by Majid Bahjat Suleiman, Bachar Kiwan, and their relatives.
