= Bedoon =

Stateless people in the Arab Gulf States

The Bedoon or Bidoon or Bidoun (Arabic: بدون جنسية, romanized: Bidūn jinsīya, lit. 'without nationality'), fully Bidoon jinsiya, are stateless people in several Middle Eastern countries, but particularly in Kuwait, where there is a large population of stateless people who lack access to basic public services. It is widely believed that the Bedoon issue in Kuwait is sectarian in nature. Several human rights organizations argue that Kuwait is violating international law by committing ethnic cleansing and genocide against the stateless Bedoon through denying them access to citizenship and its corresponding protections. Bedoons are also discriminated against in Bahrain, Oman, Saudi Arabia and Qatar.

== Kuwait ==
=== History ===
Kuwait has the largest stateless population in the entire region. Most stateless Bedoon of Kuwait belong to the northern tribes, especially the Al-Muntafiq tribal confederation. The linguist Bruce Ingham studied the northern tribes in Kuwait in the mid 20th century. A minority of stateless Bedoon in Kuwait belong to the 'Ajam community.

Under the terms of Article 4 of the Kuwait Nationality Law, the Bedoon in Kuwait are eligible for Kuwaiti nationality by naturalization. In practice, it is widely believed that Sunnis of Persian descent or tribal Saudis can readily achieve Kuwaiti naturalization whilst Bedoon of Iraqi tribal ancestry cannot. As a result, many Bedoon in Kuwait feel pressured to hide their background or sectarian affiliation.

From 1965 until 1985, the Bedoon were treated as Kuwaiti citizens and guaranteed citizenship: they had free access to education, healthcare and all the other privileges of citizenship. The stateless Bedoon constituted 80–90% of the Kuwaiti Army in the 1970s and 1980s until the Gulf War.

In 1985, at the height of the Iran–Iraq War and following an assassination attempt on Emir Jaber Al-Ahmad Al-Sabah, the Bedoon were reclassified as "illegal residents" and denied Kuwaiti citizenship and its accompanying privileges. The war threatened Kuwait's internal stability as the Bedoon issue in Kuwait "overlaps with historic sensitivities about Iraqi influence inside Kuwait", with many of those denied Kuwaiti nationality being believed to have originated from Iraq.

Since 1986, the Kuwaiti government has refused to grant any form of documentation to the Bedoon, including birth certificates, death certificates, identity cards, marriage certificates, and driving licences. The Bedoon also face many restrictions in employment, travel and education. They are not permitted to educate their children in state schools and universities.

In 1995, Human Rights Watch reported that there were 300,000 stateless Bedoon, and this number was formally repeated by the British government.

According to several human rights organizations, the State of Kuwait is committing ethnic cleansing and genocide against the stateless Bedoon. The Kuwaiti Bedoon crisis resembles the Rohingya crisis in Myanmar. In 1995, it was reported in the British parliament that the Al Sabah ruling family had deported 150,000 stateless Bedoon to refugee camps in the Kuwaiti desert near the Iraqi border with minimal water, insufficient food and no basic shelter, and that they were threatened with death if they returned to their homes in Kuwait City. As a result, many of the stateless Bedoon fled to Iraq, where they remain stateless people even today. The Kuwaiti government also stands accused of attempting to falsify their nationalities in official state documents. There have been reports of forced disappearances of Bedoon.

The 1995 Human Rights Watch report stated:

"The totality of the treatment of the Bedoons amounts to a policy of denationalization of native residents, relegating them to an apartheid-like existence in their own country. The Kuwaiti government policy of harassment and intimidation of the Bedoons and of denying them the right to lawful residence, employment, travel and movement, contravene basic principles of human rights. Denial of citizenship to the Bedoons clearly violates international law. Denying Bedoons the right to petition the courts to challenge governmental decisions regarding their claims to citizenship and lawful residence in the country violates the universal right to due process of law and equality before the law."

British MP George Galloway stated:

"Of all the human rights atrocities committed by the ruling family in Kuwait, the worst and the greatest is that against the people known as the Bedoons. There are more than 300,000 Bedoons—one third of Kuwait's native population. Half of them—150,000—have been driven into refugee camps in the desert across the Iraqi border by the regime and left there to bake and to rot. The other 150,000 are treated not as second-class or even fifth-class citizens, but not as any sort of citizen. They are bereft of all rights. It is a scandal that almost no one in the world cares a thing about the plight of 300,000 people, 150,000 of them cast out of the land in which they have lived [when] many have lived in the Kuwaiti area for many centuries."

By 2004, the Bedoon accounted for only 40% of the Kuwaiti Army, a major reduction from their presence in the 1970s and 1980s. In 2013, the UK government estimated that there were 110,729 "documented" Bedoon in Kuwait, without giving a total estimate, but noting that all stateless individuals in Kuwait remain at risk of persecution and human rights breaches. The Bedoon are generally categorized into three groups: stateless tribespeople, stateless police/military, and the stateless children of Kuwaiti women who married Bedoon men. According to the Kuwaiti government, there are only 93,000 "documented" Bedoon in Kuwait. In 2018, the Kuwaiti government claimed that it would naturalize up to 4,000 stateless Bedoon per year but this is considered unlikely. In 2019, the Iranian embassy in Kuwait announced that it offers Iranian citizenship to stateless Bedoon of Iranian ancestry.

In recent years, the rate of suicide among Bedoon has risen sharply.

=== Demographic engineering ===
The State of Kuwait formally has an official Nationality Law that grants non-nationals a legal pathway to obtaining citizenship. However, as access to citizenship in Kuwait is autocratically controlled by the Al-Sabah ruling family, it is not subject to any external regulatory supervision. The implementation of the Nationality Law is arbitrary and lacks transparency, preventing non-nationals from receiving a fair opportunity to obtain citizenship. Consequently, the Al Sabah ruling family have been able to manipulate naturalization for politically motivated reasons.

In the three decades after independence in 1961, the Al-Sabah family naturalized hundreds of thousands of foreign Bedouin immigrants – predominantly Sunnis from Saudi Arabia – in order to consolidate the power of the family. The Al Sabah ruling family favored naturalizing Bedouin immigrants because they were considered loyal to the ruling family, unlike the politically active Palestinian, Lebanese, and Syrian expats in Kuwait. By 1980, as many as 200,000 immigrants were naturalized in Kuwait; this naturalization policy continued through the 1980s and were neither regulated nor sanctioned by Kuwaiti law. The exact total number of naturalizations is unknown, but it is estimated that up to 400,000 immigrants were unlawfully naturalized in Kuwait. As a result, the number of naturalized citizens exceeds the number of Bedoon in Kuwait.

The politically motivated naturalizations were noted by the United Nations, political activists, scholars, researchers, and even members of the Al-Sabah family. It is widely considered a form of deliberate demographic engineering and has been likened to Bahrain's politically motivated naturalization policy. Within the GCC countries, politically motivated naturalization policies are referred to as "political naturalization" (التجنيس السياسي).

The Kuwaiti judicial system's lack of authority to rule on citizenship further complicates the Bedoon crisis, leaving Bedoon no access to the judiciary to present evidence and plead their case for citizenship. Although non-nationals constitute 70% of Kuwait's total population, the Al-Sabah ruling family persistently denies citizenship to most non-nationals, including those who fully satisfy the requirements for naturalization as stipulated in the state's official Nationality Law.

There is no official national census disclosing sectarian affiliation in Kuwait. However, it is estimated that 60 to 80% of Kuwait's Bedoon are Shia Muslims. As a result, it is widely believed by researchers, journalists, and governments that the Bedoon issue in Kuwait also is sectarian in nature.

=== Asylum seekers in Europe ===
A large number of stateless Bedoon regularly immigrate to Europe as asylum seekers. The United Kingdom is the most popular destination for Bedoon asylum seekers. According to the Home Office, Kuwait is the eighth largest source of asylum seekers crossing the English Channel on small boats in 2021.

== Iraq ==
Immediately after the 1991 Gulf War, many stateless Bedoon from Kuwait migrated to Iraq, most with no recognized nationality or official papers. There are currently tens of thousands of Kuwaiti stateless Bedoon living in Iraq. The process of obtaining citizenship is much simpler in Iraq than in Kuwait, owing to the presence of judicial court systems of reviewing citizenship. Since August 2017, the UNCHR has been coordinating with Iraqi NGOs to help stateless Bedoon receive Iraqi citizenship.

== United Arab Emirates ==
According to Federal Law No 17 of the United Arab Emirates Citizenship and Passport Law of 1972, any Arab who resided in the Trucial States before 1925 is eligible to obtain UAE citizenship. Many stateless people who live in the UAE have failed to obtain Emirati passports, either because they have failed to demonstrate that they lived in the region before 1925, their roots cannot be traced back to the UAE region or because they arrived in the region after 1925. Stateless people are generally considered descendants of immigrants of Badia Arabs from Balush or Iranian Baloch ancestry. The UAE also deported some Bedoon people after the Arab Spring.

All stateless people in the UAE unable to obtain any passport are offered the Comorian passport, free of charge, through a government initiative for a citizenship by investment deal worth millions of dollars with the government of Comoros. These passport holders enjoy certain citizenship privileges such as subsidized education and access to government jobs in the UAE.

== Saudi Arabia ==
Bedoon in Saudi Arabia are not considered Saudi citizens and therefore have no benefits. Saudi Arabia has also revoked citizenship of certain Saudis in the past, which means these people become Bedoon. However, some of them have the right to education, free healthcare and access to jobs that are not exclusive to citizens. Most of these Bedoon are displaced from Yemen, Jordan, and Syria.

== Islamic Republic of Iran ==
There are also stateless people in different provinces in the Islamic Republic of Iran, known as Bedoon-e Shenasnameh, which means without having a birth certificate or ID. The majority of the stateless people in Iran are Baloch people living in the province of Sistan and Baluchestan. A small minority of stateless people live in Khuzestan and Kurdistan provinces.

== Qatar ==
Qatar has a number of stateless people living within its borders. Qatar has stripped the citizenship of and imprisoned many of the members of the Al-Ghufran tribe.

== Bahrain ==
Like neighboring Qatar, Bahrain also has a number of stateless people, some of whom were dissidents.

== See also ==
- Statelessness
