= Ahmed Abdallah Mohamed Sambi =

Former President of the Comoros

Sayyid Ahmed Abdallah Mohamed Sambi
- أحمد عبدالله محمد سامبي
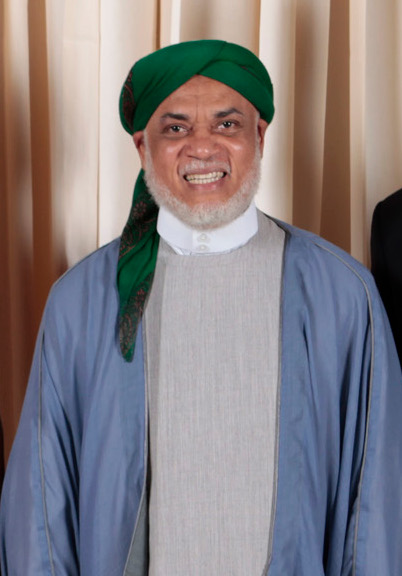
- Sambi in 2009

8th President of the Comoros
- In office 26 May 2006 – 26 May 2011
- Vice President: Ikililou Dhoinine; Idi Nadhoim
- Preceded by: Azali Assoumani
- Succeeded by: Ikililou Dhoinine

Personal details
- Born: 5 June 1958 (age 67) Mutsamudu, Comoros
- Party: Juwa Party
- Spouse: Hadjira Djoudi
- Profession: Businessperson
- Nickname: Ayatollah

Sayyid Ahmed Abdallah Mohamed Sambi (Arabic: أحمد عبدالله محمد سامبي, born 5 June 1958) is a Comorian Islamic leader and politician, who served as the eighth President of Comoros from 2006 to 2011. He is popularly known as 'Ayatollah'. After easily winning the 14 May 2006 presidential election with 58.02% of the national vote, Sambi was inaugurated as President of the Union of the Comoros on 26 May 2006. It was the first peaceful transfer of power in the history of the Comoros.

== Personal life ==
Sambi was born in Mutsamudu, on the island of Anjouan. He is a father of seven children including two named Intisware and Fatoumat. He owns factories which produce mattresses, bottled water and perfume - a key Comorian export. He lives above a shop called The House of Mattresses in Mutsamudu, the capital of Anjouan. He also set up a television station called Ulezi (education).

He is of Hadhrami Sayyid Arab ancestry, belonging to the Ba 'Alawi Sadah of Hadhramaut in Yemen, the tribe is the progeny of Ahmed Al-Muhajir who was great-grandson of Ali Al-Uraydi, a fourth generation descendant of Imam Husayn, the grandson of the Islamic prophet Muhammad.

=== "The Ayatollah of Comoros" ===
He was educated in Islamic studies in Sudan, Saudi Arabia and Qom, Iran. According to the Tehran-based Tabnak news agency, while Sambi was there he studied under Ayatollah Mesbah Yazdi. Despite his Sunni background, Sambi's time in Iran and his penchant for turbans earned him the nickname "The Ayatollah of Comoros".

== Political career ==
Running as an independent candidate in the 16 April 2006 presidential primary election on the island of Anjouan, Sambi placed first out of thirteen candidates, winning 23.70% of the vote.

In the 14 May election, Sambi was declared the victor on 15 May by Secretary of State for elections Ali Abdallah over retired French air force officer Mohamed Djaanfari and long-time politician Ibrahim Halidi, whose candidacy was backed by Azali Assoumani, the outgoing president.

== Corruption charges ==
In 2018 Sambi was charged for planning the Comoros Passport scheme with Bashar Kiwan netting $200 million dollar from the UAE government.

In August 2018, Comoros authorities charged former president Ahmed Abdullah Sambi and Bachar Kiwan with corruption, embezzlement of public funds and forgery related to the sales of Comoros passports. Sambi was jailed, and in September 2018 appealed to the Supreme Court to be granted unrestricted access to his lawyer to defend himself in the corruption case.

From 21 to 24 November 2022, Ahmed Abdullah Sambi, Bashar Kiwan, Majd Suleiman, and other directors of Comoro Gulf Holdings, the company that allegedly facilitated the sales, were tried for high treason, embezzlement and money laundering of Comorian public funds allegedly diverted from the economic citizenship program. Prosecutors sought a life sentence for the former president and his accomplices. On 28 November 2022, Sambi was sentenced to life in prison.

== Political views ==
Sambi has been quoted as saying that Comoros was not ready to become an Islamic state, nor would anyone be forced to wear a veil under his presidency. He also promised to fight corruption, create jobs and build better houses for the majority of Comorians living in poverty.

== See also ==
- Politics of the Comoros
- Tokyo International Conference on African Development (TICAD-IV), 2008.
- Ali al-Uraidhi ibn Ja'far al-Sadiq

Political offices
Preceded by Azali Assoumani	President of the Comoros; 2006–2011	Succeeded by Ikililou Dhoinine
