= Muhammad Bashar Kiwan =

Syrian-French businessman

- محمد بشار كيوان
- Kiwan in 2017.
- Born: November 30, 1966 (age 59); Kuwait
- Other names: Bashar Kiwan, Bachar Kiwan
- Citizenship: Syria - France
- Education: University of Montpellier
- Known for: Al Waseet International, United Group (UG), Comoros passport sales scandal
- Criminal charges: Criminal fraud; Embezzlement; Money laundering; Forgery
- Spouse: Angelique Kiwan
- Children: Jad Kiwan
- Relatives: Ashraf Kiwan (brother)

Muhammad Bashar Kiwan (Arabic: محمد بشار كيوان; born November 30, 1966), known as Bachar Kiwan, is a Syrian-French businessman, founder of the classified-advertising and media group Al Waseet International (AWI), which at its peak operated in 12 countries across the Middle East and North Africa and published regional editions of magazines including Marie Claire, Top Gear and Fortune. With his partners he also developed ventures in the Comoros, including tourism projects and an economic citizenship program that drew international controversy. Researchers have described his United Group (UG) as aligned with the media interests of the Syrian government under Bashar al-Assad.

His businesses collapsed after he fell out in 2016 with his Kuwaiti business partner, a member of the ruling family. Courts in Kuwait convicted him of forgery in 2017 and, in absentia, of money laundering in 2023; a Comorian court convicted him in absentia in 2022 of fraud, money laundering and embezzlement of public funds. Kiwan denies wrongdoing and says the prosecutions were retaliation by the partner, whom he accused of laundering funds linked to the 1MDB scandal; the partner was convicted in Kuwait in the same 2023 case.

Kiwan fled to France, where he has since lived openly, and several international bodies have questioned the Kuwaiti proceedings. In 2020 Spain's Audiencia Nacional refused his extradition to Kuwait, citing a risk of torture and possible persecution by the highest organs of the state; in 2023 the UN Working Group on Arbitrary Detention found his detention arbitrary and asked Kuwait to remedy it and compensate him; and in 2025 an ICSID tribunal found Kuwait had committed a denial of justice, while awarding him no compensation and rejecting his remaining claims.

== Early life and education ==
Muhammad Bashar Kiwan was born in 1966 to Syrian parents in Kuwait. He received a master's degree in economics from the University of Montpellier in France and speaks fluent Arabic, French and English.

== Career ==
In 1992, he established Al-Waseet, a classified advertising newspaper in Kuwait, in partnership with local businessmen Sheikh Sabah Jaber Mubarak Al-Sabah and Mohammed Abdulaziz Al-Otaibi. Initially a weekly publication in Kuwait, Al-Waseet expanded its operations to Jordan, United Arab Emirates, Bahrain, Qatar, Oman, Lebanon and Egypt. Additionally, it launched editions under the name Al Wasila in Saudi Arabia and Syria.

He is a founding partner in United Group for Publishing Advertising and Marketing, also known as United Group (UG), with his business partner Majd Bahjat Suleiman (son of Syrian Major General Bahjat Suleiman). Described by researchers as the media arm of the Assad regime in various Arab countries, United Group (UG) publishes the government-aligned Baladna newspaper in Syria, and published the defunct Al-Balad newspaper in Lebanon, Kuwait, and the Comoros. Kiwan and Suleiman grew their partnership with the establishment of several affiliated businesses in the fields of banking, construction, tourism, advertising and publishing, taking on local business partners in various countries. Their businesses include Al Waseet International, AWI Holding Limited, Comoro Gulf Holdings (CGH), Comoro Gulf Aviation, Dagher and Kiwan General Trading, and Jad & Jana (France).

In the Comoros, United Group (UG) affiliate Comoro Gulf Holdings (CGH) worked closely with former Comorian president Ahmed Abdallah Mohamed Sambi, and "monopolized investment and development on the islands." CGH's holdings included the Comoros United Company for Publishing and Distributing, which published the weekly newspaper Al-Waseet and a daily newspaper in Arabic and French, Al-Balad. CGH also established a local bank, the Banque Féderale De Commerce, in Comoros.

Kiwan and Suleiman also established AWI Company, also known as AWI Group, an affiliate of United Group (UG) based in Dubai Media City. AWI Company published a number of technical and advertising newspapers and magazines in 35 cities in 12 countries. The group publications included Layalina, Top Gear, Marie Claire, Fortune, and Concord Media for Road Advertisements. The group planned for an IPO in 2012 but stopped due to Syrian civil war. By 2010 the group employed about 3,500 people and sold advertising for media outlets including Al Jazeera and Al Hayat. Kiwan's former positions include chairman of the Syrian Business Council in Kuwait, Honorary Consul of Comoros in Kuwait, and member of the Syrian-Iranian Business Council.

== Legal proceedings ==
=== Comoros Islands ===
Kiwan and his close associate, then Comorian president Abdullah Sambi, launched an economic citizenship program under which Comorian citizenship was sold, principally to stateless residents of Gulf states. In 2018, Kiwan, two former Comoros presidents, and several other associates were criminally charged in relation to embezzlement of millions of euros diverted from this program to Kiwan and his associates.

Thousands of passports had been sold outside of official channels by 'mafia networks', of which hundreds were sold to Iranians, prompting fears amongst Western and Gulf allies that the passports were being used to skirt sanctions.

From 21 to 24 November 2022, Kiwan was tried for embezzlement and money laundering of Comorian public funds allegedly diverted from the economic citizenship program. On 28 November 2022, Bashar Kiwan was found guilty of criminal fraud, money laundering, and embezzlement of Comorian public funds. He was sentenced, in absentia, to 10 years in jail. Sambi was sentenced to life imprisonment for high treason in the same proceedings. During the trial, Sambi's lawyers accused Comorian government officials of seeking to pressure Kiwan, a co-defendant, into testifying against the former president in exchange for a pardon, which the presidency denied.

=== Kuwait ===
In November 2017, Kiwan was sentenced to five years in prison in Kuwait for forgery, following a case initiated by his business partner, Sheikh Sabah Jaber Mubarak Al-Sabah. Shortly thereafter, Kiwan illegally fled Kuwait, and in January 2018, three individuals were arrested for aiding his escape. Kiwan made his way to France, where he has since lived openly, speaking to international media about his cases. He was detained in Madrid in March 2019 under an international warrant issued by Kuwait; in February 2020, Spain's Audiencia Nacional refused his extradition, citing a risk of torture and noting "the possible existence of persecution by the highest organs of the State". In June 2020, The Wall Street Journal reported, largely on the basis of Kiwan's account and documents he provided, that Jho Low, the financier accused of masterminding the 1MDB scandal, had moved funds through Kuwait with the involvement of Kiwan's business partner; Kiwan said he had refused to transfer funds, had been detained and beaten by Kuwaiti secret services, and had become a target of retribution after the falling-out. A spokesperson for the partner denied the allegations. By December 2020, Kiwan initiated arbitration proceedings against the State of Kuwait, claiming damages arising from the government’s alleged seizure of his investments following criminal investigations related to fraud charges and his imprisonment.

In March 2023, a Kuwaiti criminal court convicted five men—among them Jho Low, Sheikh Sabah Jaber Mubarak Al-Sabah and Kiwan—of laundering funds linked to the 1MDB scandal. The sheikh and his business partner received 10 years' hard labour and a Kuwaiti lawyer seven years, while Low and Kiwan, both abroad, received their 10-year sentences in absentia. In April 2023, the UN Human Rights Council’s Working Group on Arbitrary Detention found that Kiwan’s deprivation of liberty in Kuwait had been arbitrary under its categories I and III, citing incommunicado detention, torture and violations of his fair-trial rights; it requested that Kuwait "take the steps necessary to remedy the situation of Mr. Kiwan without delay" and accord him "an enforceable right to compensation and other reparations, in accordance with international law".

In March 2025, the International Centre for Settlement of Investment Disputes (ICSID) tribunal issued its final award in Kiwan’s arbitration against Kuwait. The tribunal found that Kuwait had breached the fair-and-equitable-treatment standard of the France-Kuwait Bilateral Investment Treaty (BIT) through a denial of justice and serious due-process violations in the proceedings tied to Kiwan’s “human trafficking” conviction, which was related to his illegal departure from Kuwait. The tribunal nevertheless determined that the breach had caused Kiwan no compensable financial loss, denied his claim for moral damages (such as reputational harm), and rejected all other claims, so he received no compensation; it also declined to award Kuwait its claimed legal costs.

== Business and political ties ==
A 2022 report by the Harmoon Center for Contemporary Studies, a Syrian opposition research centre, identified Bashar Kiwan as part of a network of Syrians residing abroad who it said performed functions of a dual nature for the Assad regime, mainly in the financial and military sphere.

Bashar Kiwan was a member of the Syrian-Iranian Business Council (SIBC). According to the Omran Center for Strategic Studies, he served as an intermediary for Iranian purchases of real estate in Syria alongside his business associate Mazen Al Tarazi. In March 2019, Mazen Al Tarazi was arrested in Kuwait and charged with money laundering.

== Personal life ==
Kiwan is married to French national Angelique Tournoud Kiwan, who he met on a ski trip in college. The couple has one son, Jad Kiwan. Angelique Tournoud co-founded fashion accessory brand LE MARAIS 101 with Zina Khair, the wife of Bashar Kiwan's business partner Majd Suleiman.

== See also ==
- Comoros passport sales scheme
- Majd Bahjat Suleiman
- United Group (UG)
