= Majd Bahjat Suleiman =

Syrian businessperson

- مجد بهجت سليمان
- Born: 28 October 1974 (age 51); Damascus, Syria
- Other names: Majid Bahjat Suleiman, Majd Suleiman, Majd Sleiman, Majd Sulayman
- Citizenship: Syrian
- Occupation: Businessman
- Known for: United Group (UG), AWI Company, Al Waseet Intertnational
- Spouse: Zina Khair
- Father: Bahjat Suleiman
- Relatives: Haidara Suleiman (brother)

Majd Bahjat Suleiman (Arabic: مجد بهجت سليمان, born 28 October 1974; also known as Majid Suleiman) is a Syrian businessman and son of the former Syrian ambassador to Jordan and intelligence chief Bahjat Suleiman. He is the owner of Syria's largest media conglomerate, United Group (UG) which also operates under the trade name AWI Company and is affiliated with Al Waseet International.

== Background ==
Majd Suleiman is the son of former Syrian ambassador to Jordan and head of the internal branch of the Syrian General Intelligence Directorate (GID) Bahjat Suleiman, and was identified by the United States Congressional Research Service as a "Key member of the Asad Family & Other Elites". His media conglomerate, United Group, owns and publishes Baladna, one of two private daily newspapers covering political topics that have succeeded in staying open after the Syrian civil war, due to close ties to the Syrian government.

His younger brother Haidara Suleiman is the editor-in-chief of Syrian government-aligned newspaper Baladna, a member of the Syrian Electronic Army, and runs Syrian President Bashar al-Assad's page on Facebook.

== Career ==
He is a founding partner in United Group for Publishing Advertising and Marketing, also known as United Group (UG), with his business partner Bachar Kiwan United Group (UG) publishes the government-aligned Baladna newspaper in Syria, and published the defunct Al-Balad newspaper in Lebanon, Kuwait, and the Comoros. Kiwan and Suleiman grew their partnership with the establishment of several affiliated businesses in the fields of banking, construction, tourism, advertising and publishing, taking on local business partners in various countries. Their businesses include Al Waseet International, AWI Holding Limited, Comoro Gulf Holdings (CGH), Comoro Gulf Aviation, and Jad & Jana (France).

Suleiman and Kiwan also established AWI Company, also known as AWI Group, an affiliate of United Group (UG) based in Dubai Media City. AWI Company published a number of technical and advertising newspapers and magazines in 35 cities in 12 countries. The group publications included Layalina, Top Gear, Marie Claire, Fortune, and Concord Media for Road Advertisements. The group planned for an IPO in 2012 but stopped due to Syrian civil war.

== Personal life ==
Majd Suleiman is married to fashion entrepreneur Zina Khair, co-founder of the fashion accessory brand LE MARAIS 101. In 2005, the Canadian Foreign Affairs department was criticized for issuing a tourist visa to Zina Khair at the request of Bahjat Suleiman, so that she could give birth in Montreal.
