= Bernard Membe =

Tanzanian politician (1953–2023)

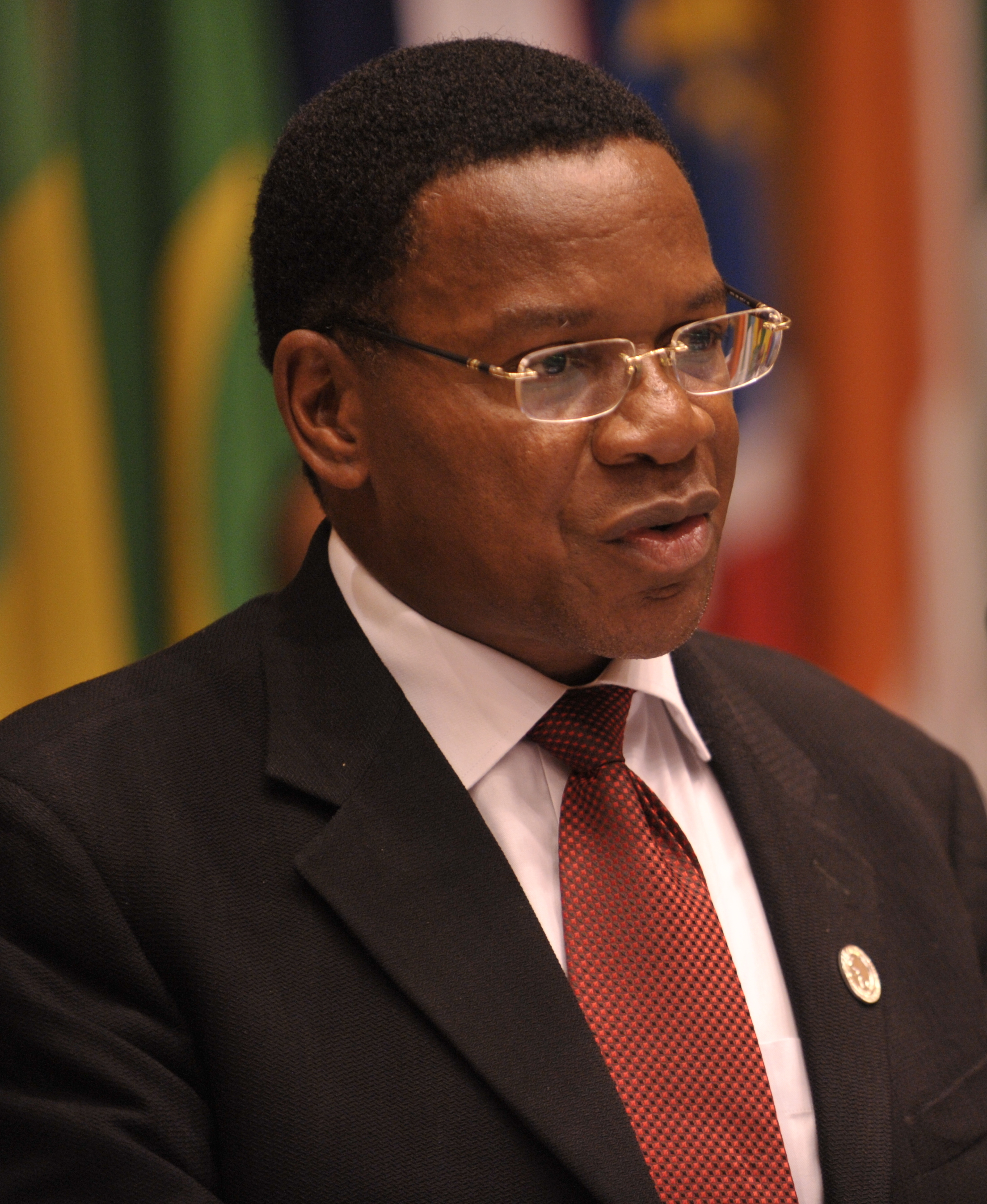
- Membe in 2009

Minister of Foreign Affairs
- In office 13 January 2007 – 5 November 2015

Deputy Minister of Energy and Minerals
- In office 17 October 2006 – 12 January 2007
- Minister: Nazir Karamagi
- In office 6 January 2006 – 16 October 2006
- Minister: John Chiligati

Member of Parliament for Mtama
- In office November 2000 – July 2015
- Succeeded by: Nape Nnauye

Personal details
- Born: 9 November 1953 Lindi Region, Tanganyika
- Died: 12 May 2023 (aged 69) Kairuki Hospital, Dar es Salaam, Tanzania
- Party: Chama Cha Mapinduzi
- Other political affiliations: Alliance for Change and Transparency (2019–2022)
- Spouse: Dorcas Membe
- Education: University of Dar es Salaam; Johns Hopkins (M.A.)
- Twitter handle: @BernardMembe

Military service
- Allegiance: United Rep. of Tanzania
- Branch/service: National Service
- Military camp: Oljoro
- Duration: 1 year

Bernard Kamilius Membe (9 November 1953 – 12 May 2023) was a Tanzanian politician. He served as a Minister of Foreign Affairs of Tanzania from 2007 to 2015. He also served as a Member of Parliament for Mtama constituency from 2000 to 2015.

== Early life and education ==
Membe was educated at Rondo-Chiponda Extended Primary School and Namupa Seminary Secondary School for his O Levels. He attended Itaga Seminary High School for his A Levels. He studied political science at the University of Dar es Salaam and international relations at Johns Hopkins University. He did his national service for one year at Oljoro Military Camp in Arusha Region.

== Political career ==
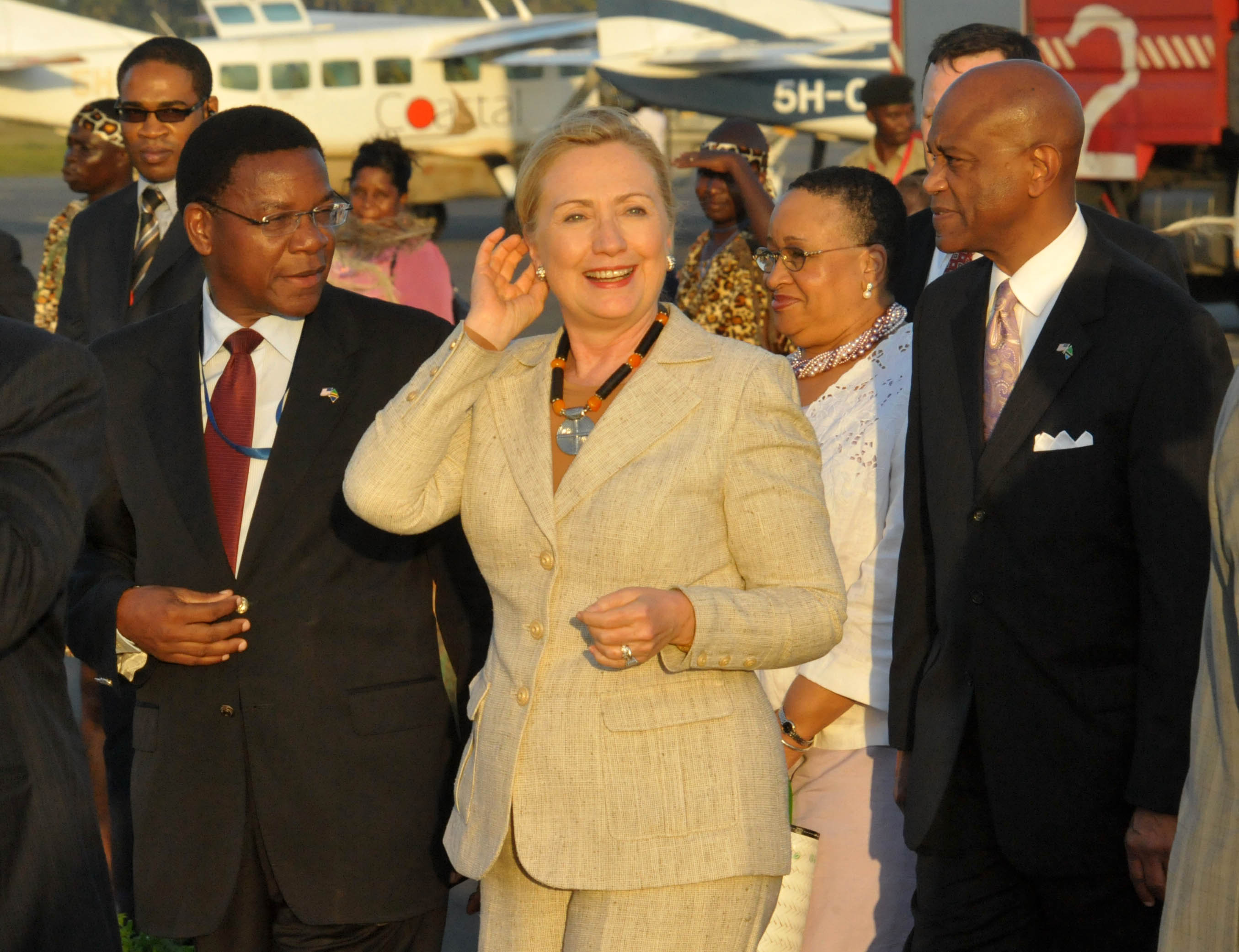
Membe with Hillary Clinton at the Dar es Salaam Airport, 2011

Membe served as a national security analyst at the President's Office from 1978 to 1989. He thereafter attended Johns Hopkins University in Washington, D.C. where he studied international relations from 1990 to 1992. In 1992, he was assigned to serve as an Advisor of the Tanzanian High Commissioner in Ottawa, Canada, where he served until 2000.

In 2000, he was elected as a CCM member of parliament representing the Mtama constituency in the general election. He was re-elected in 2005 and 2010. He was appointed Deputy Minister of Home Affairs by President Jakaya Kikwete after the 2005 general elections. After a cabinet reshuffle in October 2006, he was appointed Deputy Minister of Energy and Minerals.

In January 2007, he was appointed the Minister of Foreign Affairs and International Co-operation after his predecessor Asha-Rose Migiro was appointed the United Nations Deputy Secretary-General by the U.N. Secretary General Ban Ki-moon. He also served as a member of the National Executive Committee of the ruling Chama Cha Mapinduzi party beginning in 2007; having been re-elected in 2012 at the 8th CCM Congress in Dodoma.

In January 2013, Membe informed his constituents that he would not be vying for a seat in the next parliamentary elections in 2015 thus giving rise at the time to speculation that he may have been considering a run for the presidency of Tanzania.

In February 2020, the CCM's central committee expelled Membe from the party after accusing him of " indiscipline and violating the party's ethics and constitution". He denied wrongdoing and said he was expelled because he wanted to stand for nomination as the party's presidential candidate.

In July 2020 he handed back his CCM membership card. Later that month he joined the opposition Alliance for Change and Transparency (ACT) and said he was willing to stand as its candidate in the presidential election in 2020.

In March 2022 he returned to his former political party, Chama Cha Mapinduzi. The Central Committee for CCM agreed and decided to reinstate his membership.

== Foreign minister ==
In June 2008, Membe spoke on behalf of three SADC countries saying that if the Zimbabwean runoff election were to be held it would never be free and fair due to the violence. Joram Gumbo of the ruling Zanu-PF accused Membe of bias. On 2 September he said that Tanzania would like to see a 50-50 power sharing agreement in order to avert the Zimbabwean economic crisis.

In November 2010 at the International Day of Solidarity with the Palestinian People held in Dar es Salaam, he said that Israel needed to halt the siege of Gaza, cease illegal construction in the occupied land and also dismantle the separation wall. He was also dismayed by Israel's excessive use of force saying that the Palestinians fight using stones and catapults but the Israelis retaliate with disproportional power by using bullets and bombs. In October 2011, Membe stressed that Tanzania fully supports Palestine's bid to join the United Nations.

In May 2011, Membe rejected BAE Systems decision to pay Tanzania the ex gratia amount of £29.5 million via a charity. The amount in question was due to the sale of an overpriced radar to Tanzania in 2002. He insisted the charity would not be allowed to operate in the country if the payment was to proceed. Membe was quoted as saying, "These people are desperately trying to exonerate themselves of a graft scandal and pass the buck to the government, for the world to believe that Tanzania is so corrupt that it cannot be trusted."

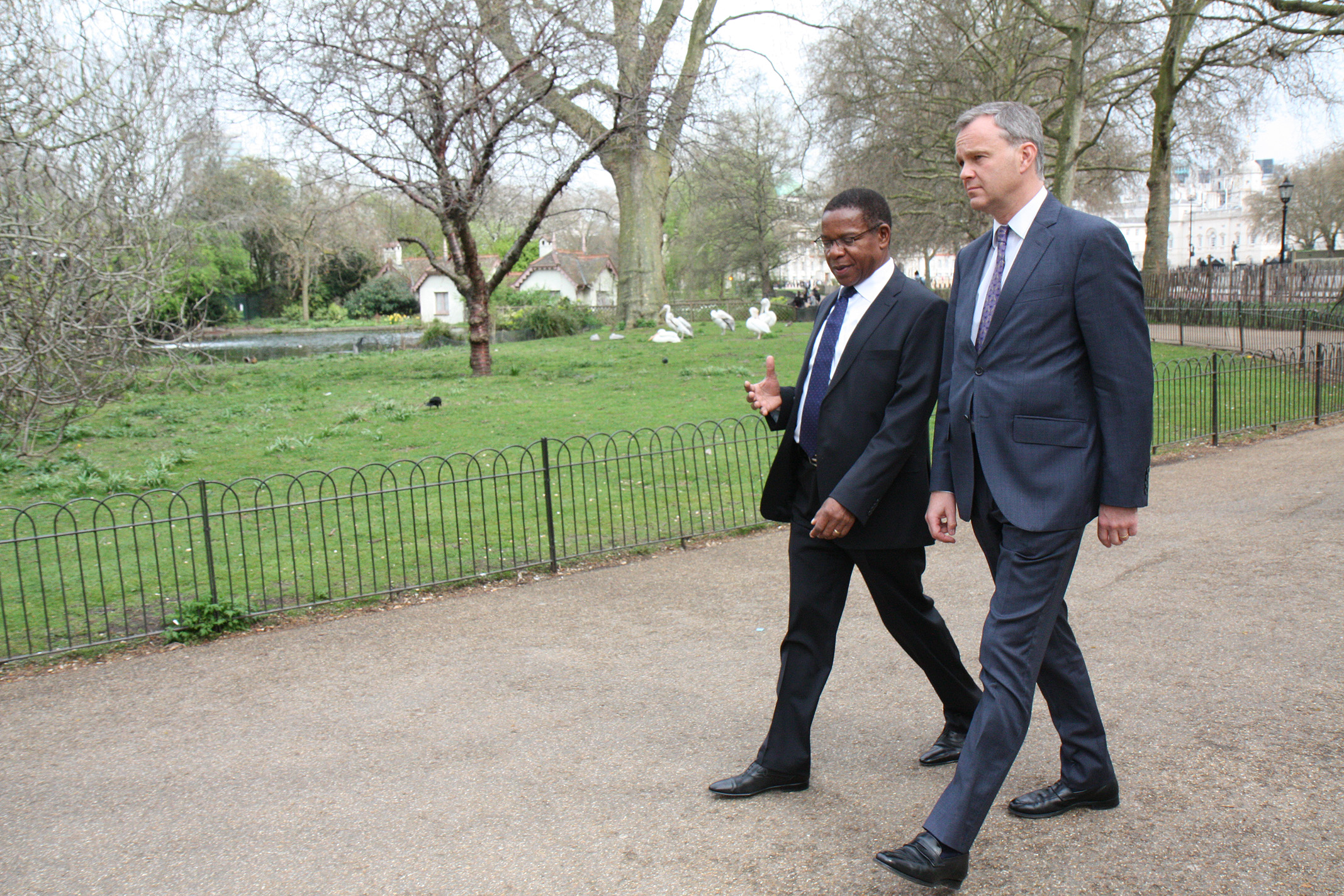
Membe with Mark Simmonds at St. James's Park in London.

Despite Bernard Membe's statement that "These people are desperately trying to exonerate themselves of a graft scandal and pass the buck to the government, for the world to believe that Tanzania is so corrupt that it cannot be trusted" he has never condemned anyone in Tanzania for the corruption involved in the BAE scandal.

In March 2012 Dr. Edward Hosea Tanzania’s most senior anti-corruption officer and head of Tanzania’s Prevention and Combating of Corruption Bureau (PCCB) was reported to have stated that no Tanzanian was involved in the BAE radar scandal. The rising levels of corruption in Tanzania under the Kikwete regime is well documented, but this statement by Hosea, reported in Tanzania’s part State owned newspaper the Daily News on 31 March if accurate, demonstrates an arrogant refusal to address it. No comment from Bernard Membe was forthcoming after this statement by Hosea.

Membe's foreign ministry has also been blighted by the Silverdale Farm issue and the corrupt conduct of the powerful Mengi family in Tanzania.

In 2004, British investors Stewart Middleton and Sarah Hermitage purchased a 45-year lease to Silverdale & Mbono farms, situated in the Hai District of the Kilimanjaro Region from Benjamin Mengi, brother to Reginald Mengi owner of IPP Media a close friend of President Kikwete and Chairman of the Tanzania Private Sector Foundation.

One year after the assignment, Benjamin Mengi demanded the lease back, stating he had not been paid in full. This was despite the fact that he had signed a receipt for the monies. When the investors refused, Benjamin Mengi stated publicly in front of senior police officers, he would drive the investors from Tanzania by any means; “cut to pieces in a coffin, if necessary”.

A four-year campaign of violence and harassment was then unleashed against the investors, facilitated by the police and judiciary and involving a plethora of State institutions. Benjamin Mengi drove the investors from Tanzania using the courts, judiciary and government ministers in a campaign of violence and corruption. This criminal conduct remains unchecked despite the personal promises of President Kikwete and Bernard Membe to the British government that the rule of law would be upheld in this case.

Reginald Mengi sued Sarah Hermitage for Libel in the High Court in London in October 2012 after she alleged that he had used IPP Media to run a campaign of journalist terrorism against her, her family and Tanzanian staff to support his brother’s campaign to grab their investment.

Hermitage successfully defended this case. The judge ruled that Reginald Mengi and his witnesses lied to and misled the UK High Court. Importantly, the court found that he was complicit in the corruption of his brother Benjamin in his attempts to steal the investors property i.e. the lease to Silverdale and Mbono Farms.

Bernard Membe trumpeted vocally Tanzania's commitment to foreign investment. Albeit on a small scale, the British investors in the Silverdale issue had the opportunity to provide truly sustainable development in Tanzania and to improve the lives of the poor. The Silverdale issue illustrates how the climate of governance in Tanzania discourages private investment. It also works against the promotion of the well-being of Tanzania’s own citizens yet, as foreign Minister Bernard Membe has not condemned Reginald Mengi's corruption or any aspect of his government's failure to uphold the laws of Tanzania in respect of the British investor's legal rights.

On 21 September 2011, Membe appeared on the Straight Talk Africa talkshow hosted by Shaka Ssali. He was asked if Tanzania had helped to overthrow the Seychellois President James Mancham in 1977 and put into power the socialist France-Albert René; Membe responded by saying that Albert Rene had asked for Tanzania's assistance and Tanzanians did not hesitate to go all the way to Seychelles to transform that archipelago.

=== Chairman of the AU Executive Council ===
As foreign minister, Membe served as the chairman of the Executive Council of the African Union for one year when Tanzania assumed the rotating chair of the continental body in January 2008. During his tenure, Mauritania and Guinea had their membership suspended after the 2008 Mauritanian coup d'état and 2008 Guinean coup d'état respectively. Their delegations were barred from attending the biannual summit in January 2009. Membe was quoted as saying, "There is no good coup or bad coup. A coup is a coup and it cannot be tolerated." He also said the AU was against the indictment of Sudanese President Omar al-Bashir by the International Criminal Court.

=== Lake Nyasa border dispute ===
In July 2012, Membe informed his Malawian counterpart that oil and gas exploration on the eastern side of Lake Nyasa (also known as Lake Malawi) should henceforth cease immediately until the ownership of the lake is resolved. Tanzania maintains that the international border runs through the middle of the lake whereas Malawi insists the border is at the Tanzanian shore citing the Heligoland–Zanzibar Treaty of 1890. In December 2012 he presented a letter of application for mediation on Tanzania's behalf to Joaquim Chissano, the chair of the Forum of Former African Heads of State and Government requesting the forum to mediate the dispute. He ruled out the belated intervention by the Malawi Council of Churches and the Christian Council of Tanzania to mediate as the matter had now been handed over to the African Forum.

== Death ==
Membe died on 12 May 2023, at the age of 69.

== Honours and awards ==
=== Honours ===
- Tanzania: Medal for Operation Democracy in Comoros, December 2008
- Comoros: Medal from Comoros, March 2009
