= Reform of the United Nations =

Calls to change the United Nations

Numerous calls and proposals for the reform of the United Nations (UN) have been put forward since the late 1990s, although there has been little clarity or consensus on what those reforms should aim to achieve. Both those who want the UN to play a greater role in world affairs and those who want its role confined to humanitarian work, or otherwise reduced, use the term "UN reform" to refer to their ideas. The range of opinion extends from those who want to eliminate the UN entirely, to those who want to make it into a full-fledged world government. Secretaries-General have presented numerous ways to implement these new reforms. Other aspects of reform concern the transparency, location, structure and decision-making process of the UN. There have been reform efforts since the creation of the UN and closely associated with each of the Secretaries-General.

On 1 June 2011, UN secretary-general Ban Ki-moon appointed Atul Khare of India to spearhead efforts to implement a reform agenda aimed at streamlining and improving the efficiency of the world body. Khare led the Change Management Team (CMT) at the UN, working with both departments and offices within the Secretariat and with other bodies in the UN system and the 193 member states. The CMT was tasked with guiding the implementation of a reform agenda at the UN that started with the devising of a wide-ranging plan to streamline activities, increasing accountability and ensuring the organization was more effective and efficient in delivering its many mandates and protocols.

== Timeline of reforms ==
The United Nations has undergone phases of reform since its foundation in 1945. During the first years, the first decisive change was the development of peacekeeping measures to oversee the implementation of ceasefire agreements in 1949 in the Middle East and one year later in the Kashmir conflict between India and Pakistan. The Soviet Union launched reform initiatives during the East-West antagonism in the 1950s to curtail the independence of the Secretariat by replacing the post of Secretary-General with a troika, including a representative from the socialist states. Decolonization created rapid growth in UN membership, and by 1965 it stood at 118, twice as many as at the Organization's founding.

With states from Africa and Asia joining the United Nations, development issues became increasingly important, resulting in the expansion of the United Nations in the development area, including the establishment of the United Nations Development Programme (UNDP) in 1965 and negotiations on a New International Economic Order (NIEO) as part of the North-South conflict in the 1970s. The 1980s were characterized by financial crisis and the retreat of the United States, which triggered a reform of the budgetary process and the downsizing of the Organization. With the end of the Cold War, the rediscovery of and renaissance of the United Nations were hailed; the first half of the 1990s saw a major expansion of the Organization and the reform associated with the Agenda for Peace launched by Secretary-General Boutros Boutros-Ghali.

A string of new peacekeeping missions were launched in Namibia, Yugoslavia, Somalia, and Angola by the Security Council which also triggered interest in the reform of the 15-member body. Germany and Japan in particular, as well as India and Brazil, launched efforts to gain permanent seats and veto rights at the Council. In the late 1990s, Secretary-General Kofi Annan improved the coherence of the United Nations, with a better coordinated development system and more effective humanitarian structures. The fight against the HIV/AIDS pandemic was energized, and a new concept of partnership between the United Nations and international business developed under the Global Compact. Other reforms included the revamping of peacekeeping operations following the Brahimi Report. The World Summit in 2005 recognized, albeit mainly symbolically, an international 'responsibility to protect' populations from genocide and the Human Rights Council replaced the discredited Commission on Human Rights.

As of 2007, Secretary-General Ban Ki-moon continued the reform agenda covering oversight, integrity, and ethics which had previously been launched in response to investigation of the UN Oil-for-Food Programme. The Programme responded to the humanitarian needs of the Iraqi civilians and was the largest, most complex and most ambitious relief effort in the history of the United Nations. With reference to the 2005 World Summit, the General Assembly approved in April 2007 a number of loosely related reform initiatives, covering international environmental governance, a unified gender organization, and 'Delivering as One' at the country level to enhance the consolidation of UN programme activities.

== Reform ideas ==
=== Security Council reform ===
A very frequently discussed change to the UN structure is to change the permanent membership of the UN Security Council, which reflects the power structure of the world as it was in 1945. Various proposals have been put forward, including ones by the G4 nations, the Uniting for Consensus group, and former UN Secretary-General Kofi Annan, suggesting that other nations – most notably Brazil, Germany, India, and Japan – should also have permanent membership, to allow for a more equitable representation within the council.

Asia’s inadequate representation poses a serious threat to the UN’s legitimacy, which will only increase as the world’s most dynamic and populous region assumes an increasingly important global role. One possible way to resolve the problem would be to add at least four Asian seats: one permanent seat for India, one shared by Japan and South Korea (perhaps in a two-year, one-year rotation), one for the ASEAN countries (representing the group as a single constituency), and a fourth rotating among the other Asian countries.

— Jeffrey Sachs at Columbia University

=== UN Secretariat transparency reform ===
At another level, calls for reforming the UN demand to make the UN administration (usually called the UN Secretariat or "the bureaucracy") more transparent, more accountable, and more efficient, including direct election of the Secretary-General by the people as in a presidential system.

UN Secretariat/administration reforms seldom gets much attention in the media, though within the Organization they are seen as widely contentious issues. They run the bureaucracy of the UN, responding to the decisions by the Member States in the Security Council and the General Assembly.

Mark Malloch Brown, the former administrator of the United Nations Development Programme, attributes the inefficiency of the UN administration to the "disconnect between the merit and reward" and further advocates "reconnecting merit to make the UN again an international meritocracy" to overcome the problem. He believes that the UN must stop promoting on the basis of political correctness that encourages promoting staffs proportionately from certain regions of the world, but instead make more use of Asia, Africa and other so-called less developed regions that now offer a large pool of talented, skilled, and highly motivated professionals. He argues that these individuals who are highly qualified will readily move up through the UN system without need of the "cultural relativism which is used to promote incompetents".

A somewhat related point is often made by UN member states from the developing world, who complain that some of the most desirable senior posts within the Secretariat are filled under a "tradition" of regional representation that favours the United States and other affluent nations. The point has been made forcefully by Ambassador Munir Akram of Pakistan, who was recently head of the G-77. "The major countries, the major powers hold very high positions in the Secretariat and support their national interests and refuse to allow the Secretary-General to cut departments", he claims. And when they do ask for budget cuts, they do it "where it does not affect their national interests". He labels this "a double standard which is applied or is thought to be applied in the Secretariat, and we as overseers of the G-77 do not accept this double standard".

Among the notable efforts of Secretariat reform since 2005 is the Secretary-General's report Investing in the United Nations from March 2006 and the Comprehensive review of governance and oversight within the UN, June the same year. From the Member States side there is the Four Nations Initiative, a cooperation project by Chile, South Africa, Sweden and Thailand to promote governance and management reforms, aiming at increased accountability and transparency.

=== Democracy reform ===
Another frequent demand is that the UN become "more democratic", and a key institution of a world democracy. This raises fundamental questions about the nature and role of the UN. The UN is not a world government, but rather a forum for the world's sovereign states to debate issues and determine collective courses of action. A direct democracy would request the presidential election of the UN Secretary-General by direct vote of the citizens of the democratic countries (world presidentialism) as well as the General Assembly (just as cities, states and nations have their own representatives in many systems, who attend specifically to issues relevant to the given level of authority) and the International Court of Justice. Others have proposed a combination of direct and indirect democracy, whereby national governments might ratify the expressed will of the people for such important posts as an empowered World Court.

=== Financing reform ===
On the subject of financing, Paul Hawken made the following proposal in his book The Ecology of Commerce:

"A tax on missiles, planes, tanks, and guns would provide the UN with its entire budget, as well as pay for all peacekeeping efforts around the world, including the resettlement of refugees and reparations to the victims of war."

The main problem with implementing such a radical tax would be finding acceptance. Although such a system might find acceptance within some nations, particularly those (1) with a history of neutrality, (2) without an active military (such as Costa Rica), or (3) with lower levels of military spending (such as Japan, which currently spends 1% of its GDP on defence), it would be unpopular among many consumers of arms. Nations in this latter category range from the United States, which spends 4% of its GDP on defence, to dictatorships who depend on arms to keep themselves in power. Other likely opponents would be nations engaged in ongoing military conflicts, or others in a state of heightened military alert, such as Israel. Arms producers would also oppose it, because it would increase their costs and possibly reduce their consumer base.

=== Human rights reform ===
The United Nations Commission on Human Rights came under fire during its existence for the high-profile positions it gave to member states that did not guarantee the human rights of their own citizens. Several nations known to have been guilty of gross violations of human rights became members of the organization, such as Libya, Cuba, Sudan, Algeria, China, Azerbaijan and Vietnam. Meanwhile, the United States was also angry when it was ejected from the Commission in 2002. While it was re-elected, the election of human rights-abusing nations also caused frictions. It was partly because of these problems that Kofi Annan in the In Larger Freedom report suggested setting up a new Human Rights Council as a subsidiary UN body.

On Wednesday, 15 March 2006, the United Nations General Assembly voted overwhelmingly in favour of establishing a new United Nations Human Rights Council, the successor to the United Nations Commission on Human Rights, with the resolution receiving approval from 170 members of the 191-nation Assembly. Only the United States, the Marshall Islands, Palau, and Israel voted against the Council's creation, claiming that it would have too little power and that there were insufficient safeguards to prevent human rights-abusing nations from taking control.

The UNHRC has itself been criticised for the repressive states among its membership. The UNHRC has also been accused of anti-Israel bias, a particular criticism being its focus on the Israeli-Palestinian conflict at each session as Agenda Item 7.

== Relocation proposals ==
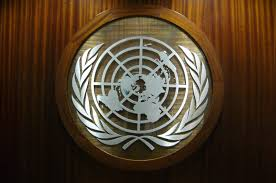
United Nations logo in headquarters

Due to the significance of the organization, proposals to relocate its headquarters have occasionally been made. Complainants about its current location include diplomats who find it difficult to obtain visas from the United States and local residents complaining of inconveniences whenever the surrounding roads are closed due to visiting dignitaries, as well as the high costs to the city. A US telephone survey in 2001 found that 67% of respondents favored moving the United Nations headquarters out of the country. Countries critical of the US, such as Iran and Russia, are especially vocal in questioning the current location of the United Nations, arguing that the United States government could manipulate the work of the General Assembly through selective access to politicians from other countries, with the aim of having an advantage over rival countries. In the wake of the Snowden global surveillance disclosures, the subject of the relocation of the UN headquarters was again discussed, this time for security reasons.

Among the cities that have been proposed to house the headquarters of the United Nations are Saint Petersburg, Montreal, Dubai, Jerusalem, and Nairobi. Another past notable proposal that was known as the "World Peace Capital" included uninhabited Navy Island, situated in the Niagara River along the Canada–United States border.

Some critics of relocation say that the idea might be expensive or could also involve the withdrawal of the United States from the organization, and with it much of the agency's funding. In past they also state that the proposals have never gone from being mere declarations.

== Creation, removals and additions for proposed UN reform ==
=== Creation of United Nations Parliamentary Assembly ===
A United Nations Parliamentary Assembly, or United Nations People's Assembly (UNPA), is a proposed addition to the United Nations System which would eventually allow for direct election of UN Parliament members by citizens of all over the world.

Proposals for a UNPA date back to the UN's formation in 1945, but largely stagnated until the 1990s. They have recently gained traction amidst increasing globalization, as national parliamentarians and citizens groups seek to counter the growing influence of unelected international bureaucracies.

=== Creation of United Nations Environment Organization ===
Following the publication of Fourth Assessment Report of the IPCC in February 2007, a "Paris Call for Action" read out by French President Jacques Chirac and supported by 46 countries, called for the United Nations Environment Programme to be replaced by a new and more powerful United Nations Environment Organization (UNEO), to be modelled on the World Health Organization. The 46 countries included the European Union member states, but notably did not include the United States, China, Russia, and India, the top four emitters of greenhouse gases.

=== Placing all UN Development Agencies and Specialized Programmes under a UNDG ===
Secretary-General Kofi Annan streamlined all UN Agencies working on International Development Issues under a new United Nations Development Group, chaired by the Administrator of the UNDP. The Delivering as One concept was also introduced. The main normative instrument for reforming the UN development system is the Quadrennial comprehensive policy review (QCPR). Following an assessment of progress, this General Assembly resolution which designs and gives mandates to the UN system to better address reform objectives is negotiated every four years. The most recent QCPR was adopted in December 2012.

=== Removal of spent provisions in UN Charter ===
Several provisions of the United Nations Charter are no longer relevant. In Larger Freedom proposed the removal of these provisions:

- Since there are no longer any trust territories, the Trusteeship Council no longer serves any purpose. Thus, Chapter XIII of the Charter is no longer relevant, and can be deleted.
- Due to Cold War disagreements, the Military Staff Committee never succeeded in its intended purpose. Although it formally still meets every two weeks, it has been effectively inactive since 1948. Thus, article 47, and the references to it in articles 26, 45 and 46 can be deleted.
- The "enemy clauses" in articles 53 and 107 contain special provisions relating to the members of the Axis in World War II (Germany, Japan, etc.) Some nations consider these to be no longer relevant; Japan in particular would like to see them removed.

There are also other provisions of the UN Charter that deal with transitional arrangements, and thus are now spent. For example, article 61(3) and article 109(3). However, In Larger Freedom does not contain any proposals with respect to these provisions.

Due to the difficulty in amending the Charter, it is unlikely that any of these spent provisions will be amended except as part of a package making substantive amendments, such as Security Council reform. Further, while In Larger Freedom proposes that certain provisions be removed, there is not universal agreement. One school of thought in particular suggests that the Military Staff Committee could be revitalized by member states finally meeting their Article 45 commitments to provide a force able to perform peacemaking and peace enforcement under the legitimacy of the United Nations flag.

== Policy research ==
The Center for UN Reform Education (CURE) is an independent policy research organization founded in 1978 to publish research on proposals to reform the United Nations. Associated with the Department of Publication Information (DPI) of the United Nations, it does not take positions on specific proposals. Issues covered by CURE monographs, papers, articles, and books have included "weighted voting, E-democracy, and restructuring of the UN's principal organs including the Security Council and the General Assembly".

== See also ==
- Amendments to the United Nations Charter
- Binding Triad: a proposal to change the power mechanisms of the UN
- Delivering as One The concept to streamline UN Development activities.
- The Four Nations Initiative on Governance and Management reform of the UN Secretariat
- United Nations Parliamentary Assembly
- United Nations Sustainable Development Group
- PassBlue
- UN Watch

== References and further reading ==
Published in the 2000s

- Müller, Joachim, 2016, "Reforming the United Nations: A Chronology", Brill Nijhoff Publisher, ISBN 978-90-04-24221-0.
- Shimbun, Asahi: Koizumi: No Shift in Article 9 for UN Security Council Bid, Global Policy Forum, 25 August 2004.
- Annan, Kofi: In Larger Freedom, 21 March 2005.
- Leopold, Evelyn: Annan wants swift decision on U.N. council reform, Reuters, 20 March 2005.
- Hans Köchler, The United Nations Organization and Global Power Politics: The Antagonism between Power and Law and the Future of World Order, in: Chinese Journal of International Law, Vol. 5, No. 2 (2006), pp. 323–340. (Oxford Journals)
- CIA World Factbook: Ranked order of Military Expenditure as a percentage of GDP, 2006
- Franda, Marcus F. (2006), The United Nations in the Twenty-first Century: Management and Reform Processes in a Troubled Organization, Lanham, Maryland: Rowman & Littlefield, p. 219, ISBN 978-0-7425-5334-7, OCLC 62895793
- Linda Fasulo, An Insider's Guide to the UN, Yale University Press, 2009.

Published in the 2010s

- Edward Horgan Thesis on UN Reform: Author Horgan, Edward J. Title The United Nations – beyond reform? : the collective insecurity of the international system and the prospects for sustainable global peace and justice / Edward J. Horgan. Thesis (PhD) – University of Limerick, 2008. Supervisor: Alex Warleigh-Lack. Includes bibliography. Also, Kaveh L. Afrasiabi, UN Management Reform (Createspace, 2011).
- Khandekar, Roopmati, 2012, "United Nations; The Reforms Process", Sumit Publishers, ISBN 9788184203301
- Mitcham, Chad, 'Jackson, Sir Robert Gillman (1911–1991)', Australian Dictionary of Biography, National Centre of Biography, Australian National University, Australian Dictionary of Biography, published online 2016.
- Mitcham, Chad,'Wilenski, Peter Stephen (1939–1994)', Australian Dictionary of Biography, National Centre of Biography, Australian National University, Australian Dictionary of Biography, published online 2020.
- Page, James, 2015. Fixing global governance, Online Opinion, 29 October 2015.
- Anthony Banbury (18 March 2016), "I Love the U.N., but It Is Failing", The New York Times. ("...colossal mismanagement")
- Runjic, Ljubo, Reform of the United Nations Security Council: The Emperor Has No Clothes, Brazilian Journal of International Law, v. 14, n. 2, 2017.
