= United Nations Sustainable Development Group =

Consortium of the Secretary-General of the UN

- Abbreviation: UNSDG
- Formation: 1997; 29 years ago
- Type: United Nations group
- Legal status: Active
- Headquarters: New York City, United States
- Head: Chair; Amina J. Mohammed
- Website: www.unsdg.un.org

The United Nations Sustainable Development Group (UNSDG), previously the United Nations Development Group (UNDG), is a group of 37 United Nations funds, programmes, specialized agencies, departments and offices that play a role in development. It was created by the secretary-general of the United Nations in order to improve the effectiveness of United Nations development activities at the country level.

Its strategic priorities are to respond to the Triennial Comprehensive Policy Review (TCPR) – which became in 2008 the Quadrennial comprehensive policy review (QCPR) – and global development priorities, as well as to ensure the UN development system becomes more internally focused and coherent. The UNSDG strategic priorities give direction to UNSDG members' efforts at the global, regional and country level to facilitate a step change in the quality and impact of UN support at the country level. The UNSDG (at the time the UNDG) was one of the main UN actors involved in the development of the Post-2015 Development Agenda, which led to the creation of the Sustainable Development Goals. The UNDG was renamed as the UNSDG around January 2018.

== History ==
By 1997, there were calls within the United Nations to draw all UN agencies working on development issues together; for the many UN Development Programmes, Funds, and Specialised Agencies were encroaching upon each other's activities. This was especially so with the Delivering as One initiative. An initial proposal was to merge UNICEF, the World Food Programme and the UNFPA into the UNDP. Finally, then-secretary-general Kofi Annan worked to form the UNDG and won praise from then UNDP administrator James Speth.

In May 2018 the United Nations Development Group (UNDG) was reorganized into the United Nations Sustainable Development Group (UNSDG) in order to accelerate progress toward the Sustainable Development Goals.

== Members ==
The following are all members of the UNSDG, as of January 2022:

- Food and Agriculture Organization (FAO)
- International Fund for Agricultural Development (IFAD)
- International Labour Organization (ILO)
- International Organization for Migration (IOM)
- International Trade Centre (ITC)
- International Telecommunication Union (ITU)
- United Nations Office for the Coordination of Humanitarian Affairs (OCHA)
- Office of the High Commissioner for Human Rights (OHCHR)
- Joint United Nations Programme on HIV/AIDS (UNAIDS)
- United Nations Conference on Trade and Development (UNCTAD)
- United Nations Department of Economic and Social Affairs (UN DESA)
- United Nations Development Programme (UNDP) / United Nations Capital Development Fund (UNCDF) / United Nations Volunteers (UNV)
- United Nations Department of Political Affairs (UN DPA)
- United Nations Economic Commission for Africa (UN ECA)
- United Nations Economic Commission for Europe (UNECE)
- United Nations Economic Commission for Latin America and the Caribbean (UN ECLAC)
- United Nations Environment Programme (UNEP)
- United Nations Economic and Social Commission for Asia and the Pacific (UN ESCAP)
- United Nations Educational, Scientific and Cultural Organization (UNESCO)
- United Nations Economic and Social Commission for Western Asia (UN ESCWA)
- United Nations Population Fund (UNFPA)
- United Nations Human Settlements Programme (UN-Habitat)
- United Nations High Commissioner for Refugees (UNHCR)
- United Nations Children's Fund (UNICEF)
- United Nations Industrial Development Organization (UNIDO)
- United Nations Office for Disaster Risk Reduction (UNDRR)
- United Nations Office on Drugs and Crime (UNODC)
- United Nations Office for Project Services (UNOPS)
- United Nations Peacebuilding Support Office (UN PBSO)
- United Nations Relief and Works Agency for Palestine Refugees in the Near East (UNRWA)
- United Nations Entity for Gender Equality and the Empowerment of Women (UN Women)
- United Nations World Tourism Organization (UNWTO)
- World Food Programme (WFP)
- World Health Organization (WHO)
- World Meteorological Organization (WMO)

The following organizations have membership confirmation pending at the UNSDG, as of March 2019:

- International Atomic Energy Agency (IAEA)
- International Civil Aviation Organization (ICAO)
- International Maritime Organization (IMO)
- Universal Postal Union (UPU)
- World Intellectual Property Organization (WIPO)

== Leadership and organization ==
=== Structure ===
The UNSDG is one of the three pillars of the UN system Chief Executives Board (CEB), which furthers coordination and cooperation on a wide range of substantive and management issues facing UN system organizations. The CEB brings the executive heads of UN organizations together on a regular basis under the chairmanship of the Secretary-General. Within the CEB structure, the High-Level Committee on Management works on system-wide administrative and management issues, the High-Level Committee on Programmes considers global policy issues, while the United Nations Development Group deals with operational activities for development with a focus on country-level work.

The Administrator of the United Nations Development Programme (UNDP) chairs the UNSDG. The UNSDG Chair reports to the Secretary-General and the CEB on progress in implementing the group's work plan, and on the management of the Resident Coordinator System.

=== Leadership ===
The UNSDG is chaired by the UN Deputy Secretary-General, with the Administrator of the UN Development Programme (UNDP) serving as the Vice-Chair. As of 2026, Amina J. Mohammed serves as the Chair (as UN Deputy Secretary-General), and Alexander De Croo serves as the Vice-Chair (as UNDP Administrator).

The United Nations Economic and Social Council and the United Nations General Assembly provide oversight and mandates for the UNSDG. The UNSDG is overseen by the Economic and Financial Committee (Second Committee) of the General Assembly. The UNSDG has provided reports such as the Comprehensive statistical analysis of the financing of operational activities for the development of the UN system for 2006 and the Comprehensive statistical analysis of the financing of operational activities for the development of the UN system for 2007 to the General Assembly.

Since 2018, the UN Deputy Secretary-General and the UNDP Administrator have served as the Chair and Vice-Chair of the UNSDG, respectively. Before 2018, the organization's Chair was the UNDP Administrator. This re-structure of the leadership happened along with the organization's name change from the UN Development Group (UNDG) to the UN Sustainable Development Group (UNSDG).

==== List of Chairs and Vice-Chairs ====
Since 2018, the UN Deputy Secretary-General has served as the Chair of the UNSDG:

- (Brazil) Amina J. Mohammed (2018–present)

Since 2018, the UNDP Administrator has served as the Vice-Chair UNSDG:

- (Germany) Achim Steiner (2018–2025)
- (Belgium) Alexander De Croo (2025–present)

Between 1997 and 2018, the following people served as the Chair of the UNDG, while serving as the UNDP Administrator:

- (United States) James Speth (1997–1999)
- (United Kingdom) Mark Malloch Brown (1999–2005)
- (Turkey) Kemal Derviş (2005–2009)
- (New Zealand) Helen Clark (2009–2017)
- (Germany) Achim Steiner (2017–2018)

=== UNSDG Advisory Group ===
Under Kemal Derviş' leadership, an "Advisory Group", which provides the UNSDG Chair with advice and guidance on managing the operational dimensions of the UNSDG and the Resident Coordinator System, was established. In 2009, the non-rotational members of the advisory group were: the FAO, ILO, UNDP, UNESCO, UNFPA, UNICEF, UNHCR, WFP, WHO and UNIDO. The rotational members (for a period of one year, as of 2016) are: UNCTAD (representing UNEP, UN-Habitat and UNODC) and the Economic and Social Commission for Western Africa (representing all five Regional Commissions).

=== Development Coordination Office ===
The UN Development Operations Coordination Office (DOCO) is a key component within the UNSDG, promoting social and economic progress by providing support. It was a key part of UNSDG's formation in 1997, uniting the UN system and improving the quality of its development assistance. Coordination leads to more strategic UN support for national plans and priorities, makes operations more efficient, reduces transaction costs for governments, and ultimately helps people attain the Millennium Development Goals and other internationally agreed development objectives. At present it is the Secretariat and technical and advisory support unit of the UNSDG. It brings together the UN development system to promote change and innovation to deliver together on sustainable development. DOCO works under the leadership of the UNSDG Chair and the guidance of the UNSDG. The team provides field evidence to inform policy, facilitates the achievement of shared results, and promotes excellence in UN leadership and coordination. The core objective is a relevant and impactful UN contribution to development.

== See also ==
- Delivering as One
- Quadrennial comprehensive policy review
- Reform of the United Nations
- United Nations Development Assistance Plan
- United Nations Development Programme
