= Nape Nnauye =

Tanzanian politician

Honourable Nape Moses Nnauye MP
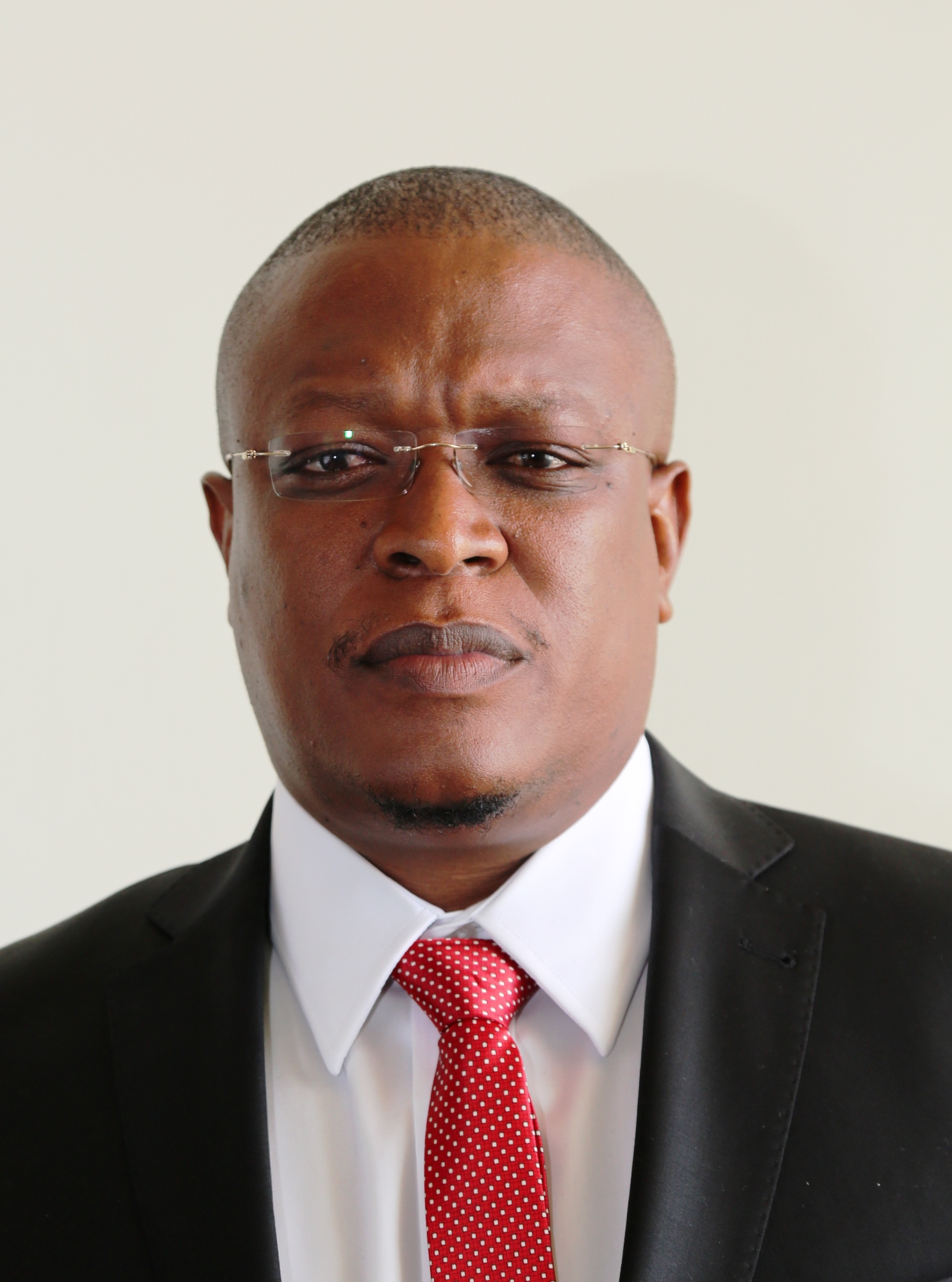

Minister of Information, Communication & ICT
- In office 10 January 2022 – 22 July 2024
- President: Samia Suluhu
- Preceded by: Ashatu Kijaji

The Minister of Information, Culture, Artists and Sports
- In office 12 December 2015 – 23 March 2017
- President: John Magufuli
- Preceded by: Fenella Mukangara
- Succeeded by: Harrison Mwakyembe

The Member of Parliament for Mtama
- Incumbent
- Assumed office November 2015
- Preceded by: Bernard Membe

Chama Cha Mapinduzi Secretary for Ideology and Publicity
- In office April 2011 – 13 December 2016
- Chairman: Jakaya Kikwete
- Preceded by: Kingunge Ngombale–Mwiru
- Succeeded by: Humphrey Polepole

The District Commissioner for Masasi
- In office 10 September 2010 – April 2011
- President: Jakaya Kikwete

Personal details
- Born: c. 1977 (age 48–49) Mwanza
- Party: CCM
- Education: The Bangalore University (BA); The Mzumbe University (MPA)

Nape Moses Nnauye is a Tanzanian politician presently serving as the Chama Cha Mapinduzi's Member of Parliament for Mtama constituency since November 2015.

He was elected as a Member of Parliament for the Mtama constituency in the October 2015 general election and was thereafter appointed by President John Magufuli as the Minister of Information, Culture, Artists and Sports in December 2015. He was relieved of his duty in a mini cabinet reshuffle by the president on 23 March 2017 and was replaced by Harrison Mwakyembe. In January 2022, he was appointed Minister for information, communications and information technology and was subsequently sacked by the president in a cabinet reshuffle on 22 July 2024.
