= Nadine Ibrahim =

Nigerian film director

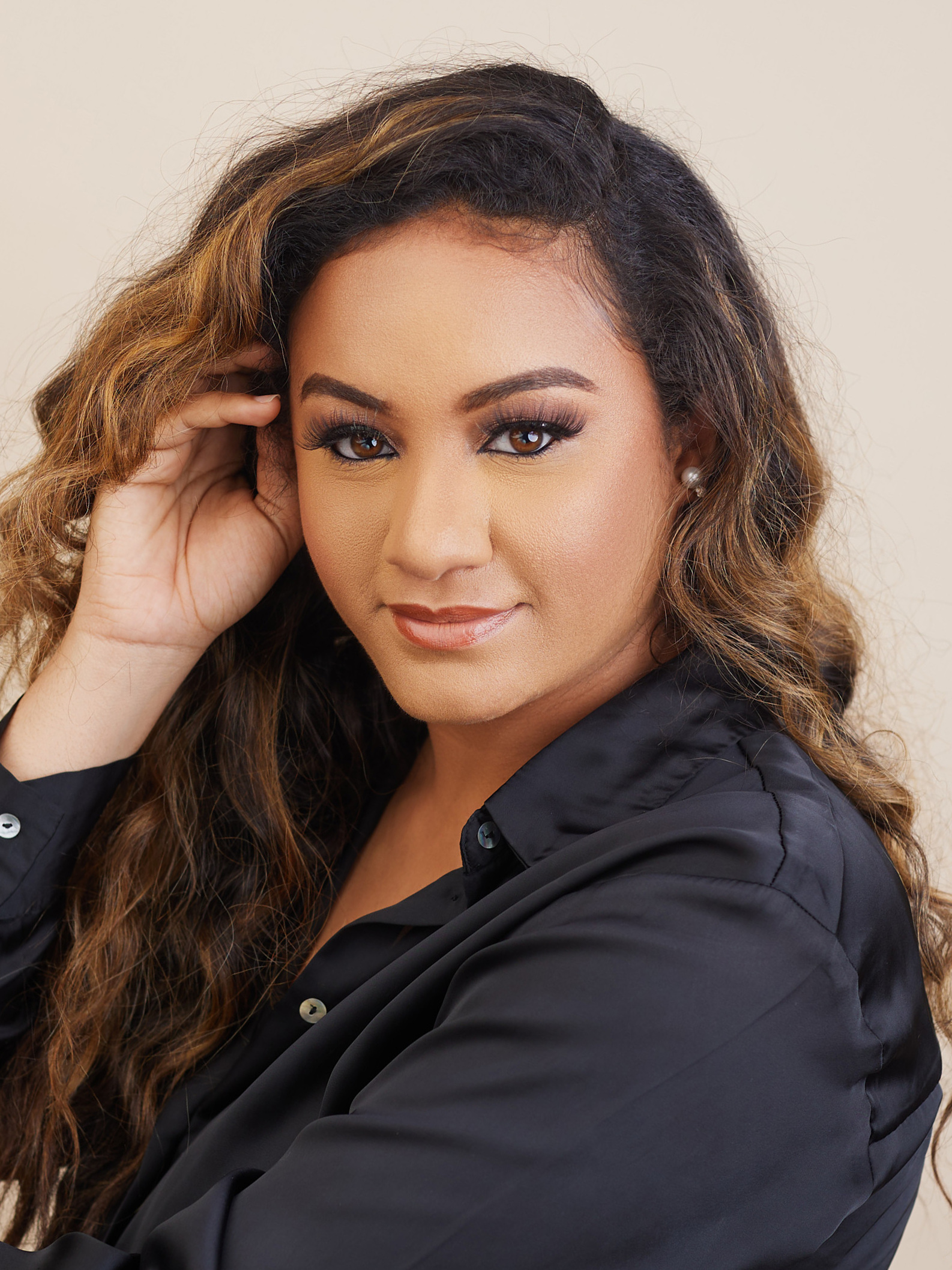
- Nadine Ibrahim in 2022
- Born: 1993 or 1994 (age 32–33); Kaduna, Nigeria
- Education: University of Gloucestershire
- Occupation: Film director
- Years active: 2015–present
- Mother: Amina J. Mohammed

Nadine Ibrahim (born 1993 or 1994) is a Nigerian film director.

== Biography ==
Ibrahim was born in Kaduna, in northern Nigeria, and was raised as a Muslim. Her mother, Amina J. Mohammed is the former Nigerian minister of the environment and current Deputy Secretary-General of the United Nations. At a young age, Ibrahim developed an interest in storytelling and filmmaking rather than traditional academic subjects. She moved from Nigeria to Great Britain at the age of 14 and studied media and film production at the University of Gloucestershire. Among other things, she worked on projects for the United Nations and Fictionless films. Ibrahim was the associate producer for Hakkunde, about a Southern Nigerian who encounters Northern culture for the first time.

Her short documentary film Through Her Eyes was released in 2017. It tells the story of a Azeeza, a 12-year-old girl who was kidnapped and became a suicide bomber. The film was a semi-finalist at the Los Angeles Cinema Festival and was nominated in the short film category at the Africa International Film Festival. For the media group EbonyLife films and television she used film to tell stories of the ethnic groups of northern Nigeria, such as the Hausa, Fulani, Igbira, Igala, Tiv and Gbagyi. She is the CEO of a Nigerian-based multimedia company, Nailamedia, founded in 2017. Her documentary short film Marked, which she worked on for two years, was inspired by the marking on her aunt's face, and made its debut at the Aké Festival in Lagos in 2019. It deals with traditional scarification, which is widespread in Nigeria but also a taboo subject, however, the beauty aspect of it was what Ibrahim wanted to champion.

Ibrahim listed Tyler Perry, Alfred Hitchcock, Spike Lee and Ang Lee as her role models. Another important influence she mentions is her mother, through whose work in the government she learned of poverty and corruption in Nigeria. She has been named one of the top young Nigerian filmmakers to watch.

== Partial filmography ==
- 2015: Idéar (short film)
- 2017: Hakkunde (short film)
- 2017: Through Her Eyes (short film)
- 2018: Tolu (short film)
- 2019: I am not corrupt (short film)
- 2019: Marked (short film)
- 2019: Words cut deep (short film)
