= United Nations Development Assistance Plan =

- Abbreviation: UNDAP

The United Nations Development Assistance Plan (UNDAP) is a common business plan for the United Nations agencies and national partners, aligned to the priorities of the host country and the internationally agreed development goals. It was launched by former UNDP Administrator James Speth. The UNDAP builds on the current joint programming processes for developing an UNDAF and UNDAF Action Plan.

== Methodology ==
The UNDAP methodology was first used in Tanzania. The methodology was designed based on experiences from the previous UNDAF cycle, the Delivering as One (DaO) experience, and JAST participation. It was also a response to the recommendations from the DaO country-led evaluations.

UNDAP aims to reduce duplication in planning requirements for UN agencies and national partners and for some agencies to replace the current requirements of the UNDAF and agency-specific country programme planning documents. UNDAP aims to bring together agency-specific planning requirements in a consistent and seamless manner and ensure a "necessary and sufficient" programme logic in the results chain and resource requirements.

The plan outlines linkages to regional and global initiatives at the sectoral level, forging greater synergy between UN plans, and support of larger multilateral and bilateral programmes. Annual reviews and adjustments ensure the continued relevance of the UNDAP; the plan and its implementation modalities ensure coherence and consistency from actions to results to reporting, yielding a synergistic effect.

== Tanzania ==
Tanzania was the first country to use the UNDAP methodology. The four-year USD $777 million UNDAP for Tanzania was approved on 24 June 2011 by the Tanzanian Governments' Joint Steering Committee (JSC) and United Nations

UNDAP 2011-15 Tanzania

As part of the UNDAP development and in line with the agreement reached by UNDP, UNFPA, UNICEF and WFP, a Common Country Programme Document (CCPD) has been prepared and submitted together with agency-specific annexes. The CCPD is an extract of the contribution of the four agencies to the UNDAP.

== Uruguay ==
A joint workshop was held in Uruguay in May 2010 to discuss the design of a UNDAP plan in relation to the UN Development Assistance Framework (UNDAF) agreement between the Uruguayan government and the United Nations.

== See also ==
- United Nations Development Group
