= James Gustave Speth =

American lawyer (born 1942)

Gus Speth
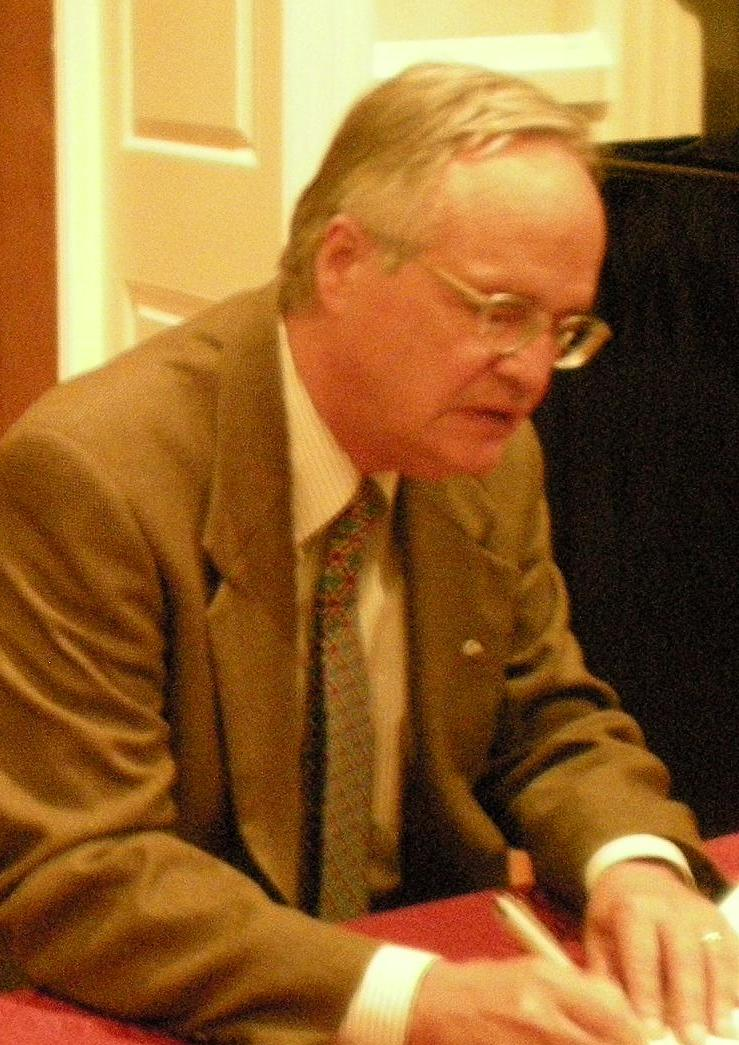
- Speth in 2008

Administrator of the United Nations Development Programme
- In office 1993–1999
- Secretary General: Boutros Boutros-Ghali; Kofi Annan
- Preceded by: William Henry Draper III
- Succeeded by: Mark Malloch-Brown

Chair of the Council on Environmental Quality
- In office 1979–1981
- President: Jimmy Carter
- Preceded by: Charles Warren
- Succeeded by: A. Alan Hill

Personal details
- Born: James Gustave Speth; March 4, 1942 (age 84) Orangeburg, South Carolina, U.S.
- Party: Democratic
- Education: Yale University (BA, JD); Balliol College, Oxford (BLitt)

James Gustave Speth (born March 4, 1942) is an American environmental lawyer and advocate who co-founded the Natural Resources Defense Council.

== Early life and education ==
Speth was born in Orangeburg, South Carolina in 1942. He graduated summa cum laude from Yale University in 1964, attended Balliol College at the University of Oxford as a Rhodes Scholar and graduated from Yale Law School, where he was a member of St. Anthony Hall and the Yale Law Journal, in 1969.

== Career ==
In 1969 and 1970, Speth served as a law clerk to U.S. Supreme Court Justice Hugo L. Black. He was a co-founder of the Natural Resources Defense Council, where he served as senior attorney from 1970 to 1977.

He served from 1977 to 1981 as a member and then for two years as chairman of the Council on Environmental Quality in the Executive Office of the President. As chair, he was a principal adviser on matters affecting the environment and had overall responsibility for developing and coordinating the President's environmental program. In 1981 and 1982, he was a professor of law at Georgetown University Law Center, teaching environmental and constitutional law. Many conservatives considered Speth to be a radical in regards to his approach to environnmetal laws.

In 1982, he founded the World Resources Institute, a Washington, D.C.–based environmental think tank, and served as its president until January 1993. He was a senior adviser to President-elect Bill Clinton's transition team, heading the group that examined the U.S.'s role in natural resources, energy and the environment.

In 1991, Speth chaired a U.S. task force on international development and environmental security which produced the report Partnership for Sustainable Development: A New U.S. Agenda.

In 1990 he led the Western Hemisphere Dialogue on Environment and Development which produced the report Compact for a New World.

From 1993 to 1999, he served as Administrator of the United Nations Development Programme; he served as special coordinator for economic and social affairs under Secretary-General Boutros Boutros-Ghali, managed the United Nations Development Assistance Plan and also served as chair of the United Nations Sustainable Development Group.

In 1999, Speth became the dean of the Yale School of Forestry and Environmental Studies at Yale University, New Haven, Connecticut. He served the school as the Carl W. Knobloch, Jr. Dean and Sara Shallenberger Brown Professor in the Practice of Environmental Policy when he retired from Yale in 2009 to assume a professorship at Vermont Law School in South Royalton, Vermont. Speth was succeeded as Dean at Yale by Sir Peter Crane.

In 2014 Speth published his memoir Angels by the River. In that year, he was also board member of the New Economy Coalition.

He currently serves on the advisory council of Represent.Us, a nonpartisan anti-corruption organization. He is an ambassador of the Wellbeing Economy Alliance.

Speth has led or participated in many task forces and committees aimed at combating environmental degradation, including the President's Task Force on Global Resources and Environment; the Western Hemisphere Dialogue on Environment and Development; and the National Commission on the Environment.

== Awards ==
Among his awards are the National Wildlife Federation’s Resources Defense Award, the Natural Resources Council of America's Barbara Swain Award of Honor, a 1997 Special Recognition Award from the Society for International Development, the Lifetime Achievement Award of the Environmental Law Institute, and the Blue Planet Prize. He holds honorary degrees from Clark University, the College of the Atlantic, Vermont Law School, Middlebury College, and the University of Massachusetts Boston.

== Publications ==
=== Books ===
- Globalization and the Environment (as an editor), Island Press (2003)
- Red Sky at Morning: America and the Crisis of the Global Environment (2004)
- Global Environmental Governance, Island Press (2006)
- The Bridge at the Edge of the World: Capitalism, the Environment, and Crossing from Crisis to Sustainability, Yale University Press (2008) ISBN 978-0-300-13611-1
- America the Possible: Manifesto for a New Economy, Yale University Press (2012) ISBN 978-0300180763
- Moral Ground: Ethical Action for a Planet in Peril (chapter), Nelson, Michael P. and Kathleen Dean Moore (eds.) Trinity University Press, (2010) ISBN 9781595340665
- Angels by the River, a memoir, Chelsea Green Publishing (2014)
- Imagine a Joyful Economy, with Peter Denton, Wood Lake Publishing Inc. (2020) ISBN 978-1-77343-161-1
- They Knew: The US Federal Government's Fifty-Year Role in Causing the Climate Crisis, MIT Press (2021) ISBN 9780262542982

=== Articles ===
- Beyond Reform Our Planet Magazine PDF
- America the Possible: A Manifesto, From decline to rebirth link
- America the Possible: A Manifesto, A new politics for a new dream link

== See also ==
- List of law clerks for the first seat of the Supreme Court of the United States

Government offices
Preceded by Charles Warren	Chair of the Council on Environmental Quality; 1979–1981	Succeeded by A. Alan Hill
Positions in intergovernmental organisations
Preceded by William Henry Draper III	Administrator of the United Nations Development Programme; 1993–1999	Succeeded by Mark Malloch Brown
