= Asha-Rose Migiro =

Tanzanian politician and UN Deputy-Secretary General

Asha–Rose Migiro
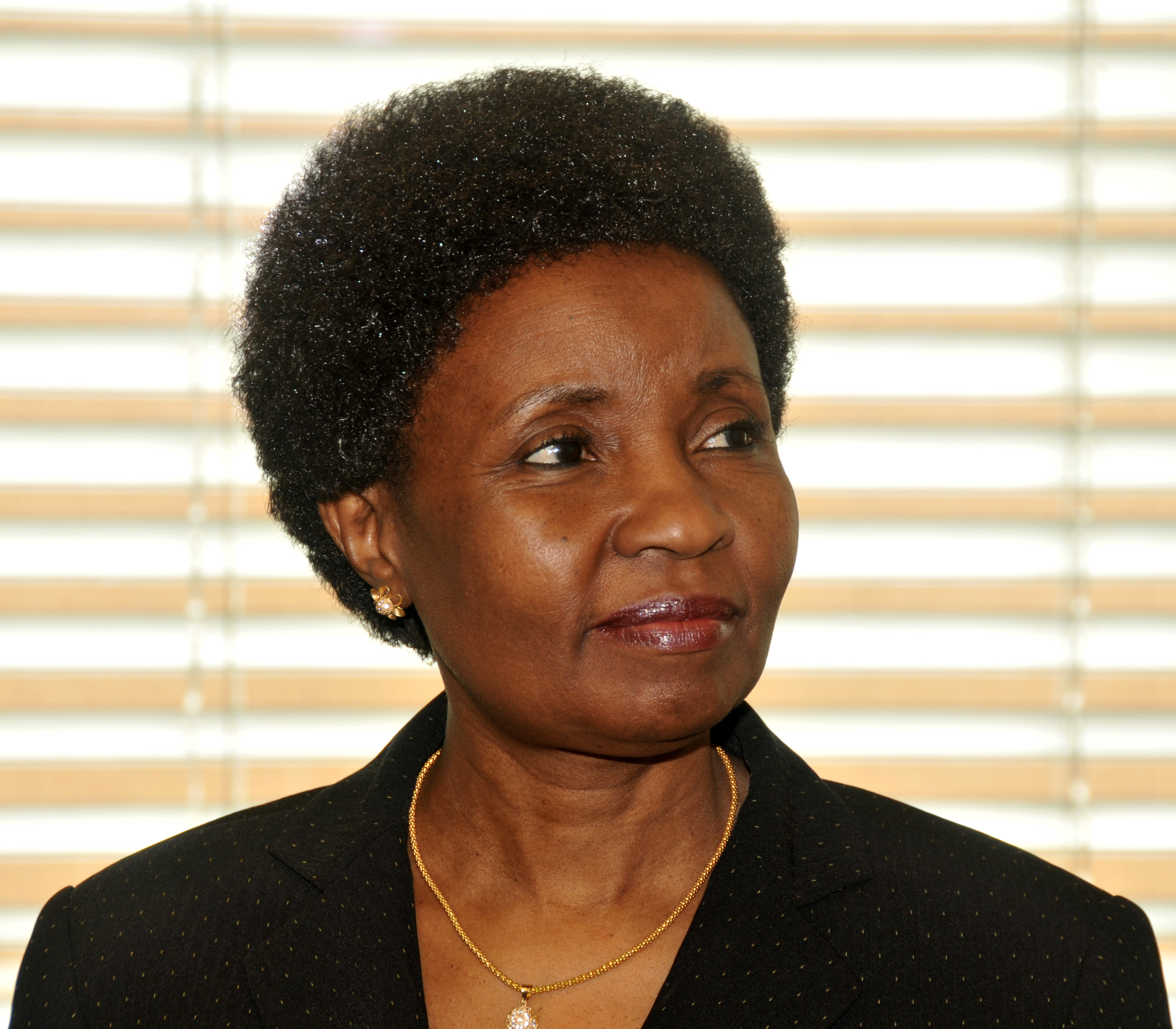
- Migiro in 2009

Minister of Justice and Constitution Affairs
- In office 20 January 2014 – 5 November 2015
- President: Jakaya Kikwete
- Preceded by: Mathias Chikawe

Member of Parliament
- In office 12 December 2013 – July 2015
- Appointed by: Jakaya Kikwete
- Constituency: None (Nominated MP)

3rd Deputy Secretary-General of the United Nations
- In office 5 February 2007 – 1 July 2012
- Secretary-General: Ban Ki-moon
- Preceded by: Mark Malloch Brown
- Succeeded by: Jan Eliasson

12th Minister of Foreign Affairs
- In office 4 January 2006 – 11 January 2007
- Preceded by: Jakaya Kikwete
- Succeeded by: Bernard Membe

Minister of Community Development, Women and Children
- In office 2000–2005
- President: Benjamin Mkapa
- Succeeded by: Sophia Simba

4th Chancellor of Open University of Tanzania
- In office 2011–2016
- President: Jakaya Kikwete
- Preceded by: John Malecela
- Succeeded by: Mizengo Pinda

High Commissioner to the United Kingdom
- In office 2016–2023
- Preceded by: Peter Kallage
- Succeeded by: Mbelwa Kairuki

Personal details
- Born: 9 July 1956 (age 70) Songea, Tanganyika
- Party: Chama Cha Mapinduzi
- Spouse: Cleophas Migiro
- Education: University of Dar es Salaam; University of Konstanz (Dr. iur.)
- Profession: Lawyer
- Positions: Lecturer, UDSM (1981–2000); Chancellor, OUT (2011-2016)

Asha-Rose Mtengeti Migiro (born 9 July 1956) is a Tanzanian politician and diplomat who was the Deputy Secretary-General of the United Nations from 2007 to 2012. She was appointed as the United Nations Secretary-General's Special Envoy for HIV/AIDS in Africa on 13 July 2012.

== Early life and education ==
Born at Songea in Ruvuma Region, Migiro commenced her education at Mnazi Mmoja Primary School in 1963. She later moved on to Korogwe Primary School, Weruweru Secondary School, and, finally, Korogwe Secondary School, where she graduated high school in 1975.

She obtained her LL.B and LL.M from the University of Dar es Salaam and her PhD in 1992 from the University of Konstanz in Germany. Before entering politics, she was a senior lecturer at the Faculty of Law at the University of Dar es Salaam (UDSM). She headed the Department of Constitutional and Administrative Law from 1992 to 1994 and the Department of Civil and Criminal Law from 1994 to 1997.

== Time in the Tanzanian government ==
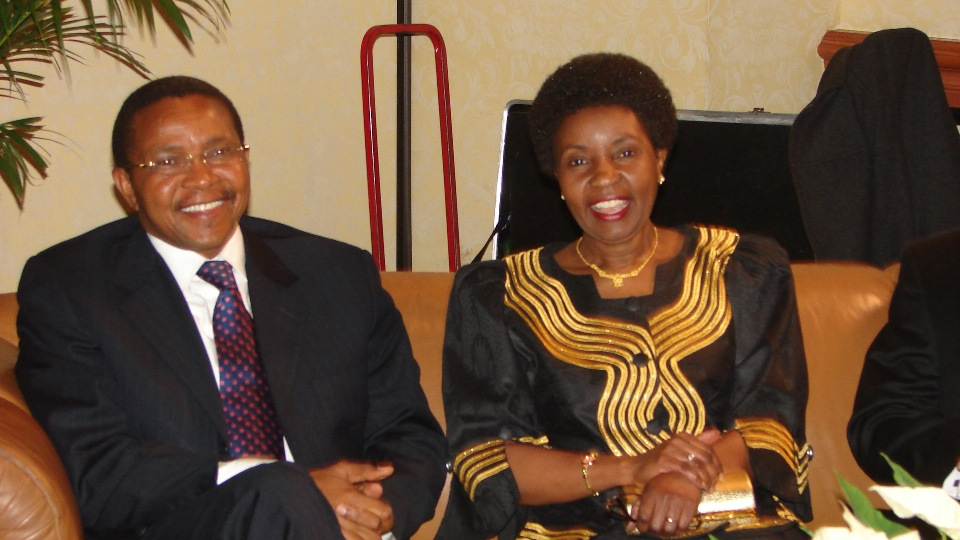
Migiro with President Jakaya Kikwete

Migiro served as a ward member of Chama Cha Mapinduzi from 1994 to 2000, and as a member of a Regional Executive Council from 2000 to 2005. From 2000 to 2006, she was the Minister of Community Development, Gender and Children's Affairs. She became the Minister of Foreign Affairs and International Cooperation on 4 January 2006, when the previous foreign minister, Jakaya Kikwete, who had been elected president, appointed his new cabinet. She was the first woman in that position since the independence of the United Republic of Tanzania.

While in the position of foreign minister, Migiro chaired the Council of Ministers' meetings of the International Conference of the Great Lakes Region and the Southern African Development Community(SADC) Ministerial Committee of the Organ on Politics, Defense and Security Cooperation. She coordinated SADC assistance to the elections in the Democratic Republic of the Congo (DRC), Zambia and Madagascar. She also served as President of the United Nations Security Council during its open debate on peace, security and development in the Great Lakes Region.

Serving as foreign minister, Migiro accompanied the former president of the Comoros, Azali Assoumani, during a tour of his country's new consulate in Tanzania and inspected a Tanzanian hospital. According to United States officials, Condoleezza Rice, the American Secretary of State, is "personally acquainted" with her. Kikwete appointed Bernard Membe to succeed Migiro as foreign minister in January 2007.

== United Nations appointment ==
Migiro was appointed to the post of United Nations Deputy Secretary-General by Ban Ki-moon, the new United Nations Secretary-General from South Korea, on 5 January 2007. According to Ban, "She is a highly respected leader who has championed the cause of developing countries over the years..." He also said that "Through her distinguished service in diverse areas, she has displayed outstanding management skills with wide experience and expertise in socio-economic affairs and development issues." According to The New York Times, this was a fulfilment of his promise to pick a woman from the developing world for the post of Deputy Secretary-General. The UN News Centre noted that Migiro and Ban had worked together while they were foreign ministers of their respective countries. She was formally appointed and assumed office on 1 February 2007.

During her time at the United Nations, Migiro was also a member of the Commission on Effective Development Cooperation with Africa which was set up by the Prime Minister Anders Fogh Rasmussen of Denmark and held meetings between April and October 2008. In September 2009, she travelled to Rome and had a meeting with Italian foreign minister Franco Frattini and Pope Benedict XVI to discuss violence against women. United Nations representatives were reportedly preparing to finalise an initiative aimed at stopping the genital mutilation of women and genocide.

Migiro served as Deputy Secretary-General until June 2012.

== Later career ==
After serving at the United Nations, Migiro returned to Tanzania and was appointed cabinet minister in the cabinet of Jakaya Kikwete. She later entered the race to become the CCM candidate in the 2015 presidential elections, but lost the nomination to the eventual winner John Magufuli.

President Magufuli appointed Migiro as High Commissioner to the United Kingdom in May 2016.

== Personal life ==
She is married to Cleophas Migiro, and the couple has two daughters.

Political offices
Preceded by Jakaya Kikwete	Minister of Foreign Affairs and International Cooperation; 4 January 2006 – 11 January 2007	Succeeded by Bernard Membe
Positions in intergovernmental organisations
Preceded by (United Kingdom) Mark Malloch Brown	Deputy Secretary-General of the United Nations; 2007–2012	Succeeded by (Sweden) Jan Eliasson
Party political offices
Preceded by January Makamba	CCM Secretary for Politics and Foreign Relations; November 2012 – present	Incumbent
