= Through Her Eyes (film) =

- Directed by: Nadine Ibrahim
- Written by: Nadine Ibrahim
- Release date: 2017
- Country: Nigeria

Through Her Eyes is a 2017 Nigerian film that was directed and written by Nadine Ibrahim.

== Plot ==
The movie is a short documentary that gives insight about how children in Nigeria are abducted and made to be terrorists. It tries to explain the point that no child is born a terrorist.

== Cast ==
- Aisha Anisah Ayagi
