= Four Nations Initiative =

International cooperative project

The Four Nations Initiative (4NI) is a cooperation project started in 2005 as an initiative by Chile, South Africa, Sweden and Thailand. The initiative was created to contribute to the efforts to reform governance and management systems and structures of the UN Secretariat, departing from the perspective of the UN Member States.

The Four Nations Initiative, active from early 2006 until October 2007, consists of a steering committee with representatives from all four countries, and a secretariat based in Stockholm.

UN Secretariat reform is an important topic and was high on the agenda during the tenure of Secretary-General Kofi Annan. There have been many reform efforts, notably the Secretary-General's reports Investing in the United Nations and Mandating and delivering, both from March 2006, and the Comprehensive review of governance and oversight in the UN, June 2006.

The Four Nations Initiative differs from the above-mentioned reform initiatives by being driven by Member States themselves. It is also characterised by its focus on a consultations process trying to create as large as possible scope for consensus before actually submitting reform proposals. The Initiative plans to submit final proposals by September 2007 but a preliminary report is already available on the 4NI website (Towards a Compact - report of preliminary proposals by the Steering Committee of the Four Nations Initiative).
