= Humphrey Polepole =

Tanzanian politician and former diplomat

Honorable Humphrey Polepole Ambassador

United Republic of Tanzania Ambassador to Malawi
- In office 15 March 2022 – 3 April 2023
- President: Samia Suluhu
- Preceded by: Amb. Benedict Martin Mashiba
- Succeeded by: Agnes Richard Kayola

Member of Parliament
- In office 2020–2022
- President: John Magufuli
- Preceded by: None (Nominated MP)
- Succeeded by: Appointment End

CCM Ideology and Publicity Secretary
- In office 13 December 2016 – 30 April 2021
- Chairman: John Magufuli
- Preceded by: Nape Nnauye
- Succeeded by: Shaka Hamdu Shaka

United Republic of Tanzania Ambassador to Cuba
- In office 3 April 2023 – 13 July 2025
- Preceded by: Valentino Longino Mlowola

Personal details
- Born: Humphrey Herson Polepole; 25 November 1980 Muleba District, Kagera Region, Tanzania
- Party: CCM
- Education: Mwalimu Nyerere Memorial Academy; University of Dar-es-Salaam
- Profession: Civil Servant . Diplomat . Lobbyist . Social Activist
- Committees: Chairman, Parliamentary Standing Committee on Administration and Local Government

Humphrey Herson Polepole (born 25 November 1980) is a Tanzanian politician and diplomat who served as Tanzania's Ambassador to Cuba from 2023 until his resignation on 13 July 2025. He previously served as Tanzania's High Commissioner to Malawi from 2022 to 2023.

He was the Chama Cha Mapinduzi's Ideology and Publicity Secretary and Member of Parliament appointed by President John Magufuli. Before being appointed, Polepole was a District Commissioner for Ubungo district for five months. Previously, he served as District Commissioner for Musoma District for two months.

He resigned from his post as ambassador to Cuba in July 2025, citing the government's disregard of the rule of law and the constitution as his reason for doing so. In the following months, he became a vocal critic of the government and President Samia Suluhu Hassan.

On 6 October 2025, a few weeks before the 2025 Tanzanian general election, his family reported that he was likely abducted from his home.

Party political offices
Preceded by Nape Nnauye	CCM Secretary Ideology and Publicity; 2016–2021	Succeeded by Shaka Hamdu Shaka
