= Red Sky at Morning (Speth book) =

2004 book by James Gustave Speth

Red Sky at Morning: America and the Crisis of the Global Environment
- Author: James Gustave Speth
- Language: English
- Genre: Non-fiction
- Publisher: Yale University Press
- Publication date: 2004
- Publication place: United States
- ISBN: 0-300-10232-1

Red Sky at Morning: America and the Crisis of the Global Environment by James Gustave Speth, is a 2004 Yale University Press book whose central premise is that environmentalism, so far, has been unsuccessful in protecting the natural environment on Earth. Deprecating the past efficacy of the Natural Resources Defense Council, the White House Council on Environmental Quality, and the United Nations Development Programme — as well as the actions of the former George W. Bush administration – Speth writes (as cited in the TIME article listed in the "References" section): "The climate convention is not protecting climate, the biodiversity convention is not protecting biodiversity, [and] the desertification convention is not preventing desertification."

Potential for effective environmentalism, he says (as cited in the TIME article) now rests upon actions analogous to "jazz": volunteerism, and improvisation. He also notes, "Since the Montreal Protocol, [the United States] has not accorded global-scale environmental challenges the priority needed." (p.116)
