= United Nations Department of Management Strategy, Policy and Compliance =

Section of the United Nations Secretariat

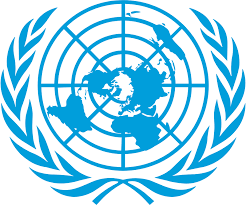
- Formation: January 2019; 7 years ago
- Website: https://www.un.org/management/

The United Nations Department of Management Strategy, Policy and Compliance (DMSPC) is a section of the United Nations Secretariat established in January 2019 and is led by the Under-Secretary-General. The DMSPC was created to uphold the United Nations policies regarding conduct during political and peacekeeping missions of high importance.

== Departments ==
The DMSPC carries out its mission through the following departments:

=== Office of Program Planning, Finance and Budget (OPPFB) ===
In accordance with Article 17 of the Charter of the United Nations, the Office of Program Planning, Finance and Budget collaborates with Member States to ensure successful reporting and management of the United Nations resources. OPPFB additionally works to create and manage workplans in cooperation with the Member States to monitor resource management and use of finances.

=== Office of Human Resources (OHR) ===
The Office of Human Resources creates and maintains an active workforce focused on effectively serving the directive of the United Nations. OHR implements the human resource framework consisting of directives, strategies, and policies to guarantee the execution of tasks in any office space. A learning and results focused workplace is fostered through workshops, talent expansion, staff development, and a focus on accountability.

=== Business Transformation and Accountability ===
Business Transformation and Accountability creates systems for risk management and accountability within the United Nations. Real time support for stakeholders is provided on performance and conduct management reviews are implemented for quality assurance.

=== Umoja - Enterprise Resource Planning Project ===
Umoja manages the United Nations resources and improves program delivery with the mission to better both administrative and financial operations. Resources include human, physical, and financial.

=== Office of Information and Communications Technology (OICT) ===
The Office of Information and Communications Technology works to create a safer and sustainable future using technology. The OICT supplies guidance in the Secretariat regarding systems, applications, and their uses for decision making.
