= Louise Fréchette =

1st United Nations Deputy Secretary-General

Louise Fréchette OC
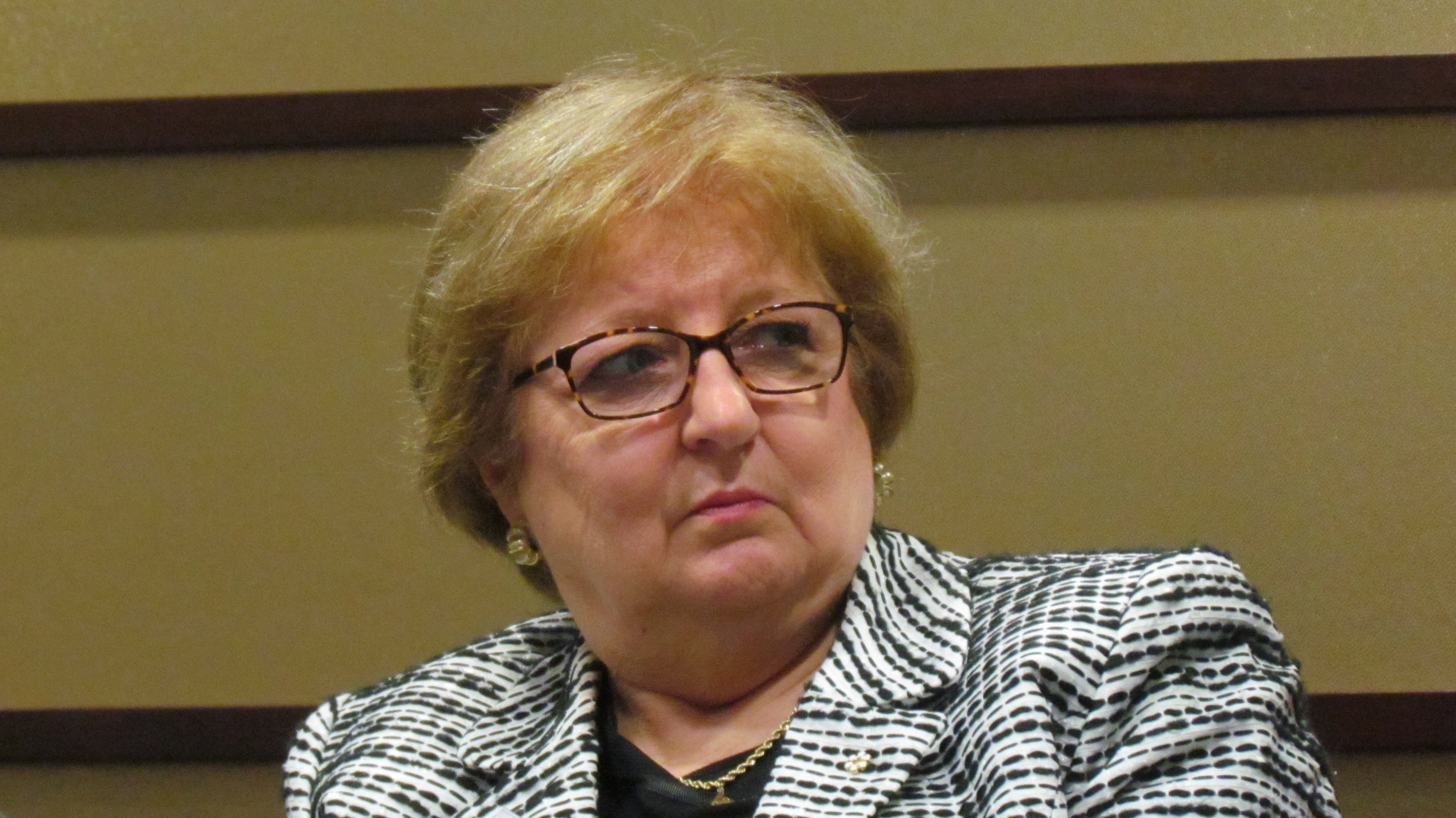
- Fréchette in 2015

1st United Nations Deputy Secretary-General
- In office 1 April 1997 – 1 April 2006
- Secretary-General: Kofi Annan
- Preceded by: Office established
- Succeeded by: Mark Malloch-Brown

Canadian Ambassador to the United Nations
- In office January 1992 – December 1994
- Preceded by: Yves Fortier
- Succeeded by: Robert Fowler

Personal details
- Born: July 16, 1946 (age 80) Montreal, Quebec, Canada
- Education: Université de Montréal; College of Europe

Louise Fréchette OC (French pronunciation: [lwiz fʁeʃɛt]; born July 16, 1946) is a Canadian diplomat and public servant who served for nine years as United Nations Deputy Secretary-General (1997–2006). She also served a three-year term at the Centre for International Governance Innovation, an international relations and policy think-tank in Waterloo, Ontario, working on a major research project on nuclear energy and the world's security.

== Early life and education ==
Born in Montreal, Fréchette graduated with a degree in history from the Université de Montréal in 1970 and from the College of Europe (Bruges) with a postgraduate Certificate of Advanced European Studies (equivalent to a master's degree) in 1978.

== Career ==
=== Diplomatic career ===
Fréchette began her career in 1971 when she joined Canada's Department of External Affairs. She was posted to the Canadian embassy in Athens before joining Canada's UN delegation in Geneva in 1978.

In 1985, at the age of 39, Fréchette was named Canada's ambassador to Argentina. In 1989, she was sent on a secret mission to Cuba to lobby Fidel Castro to support the Gulf War. While unsuccessful, she impressed Ottawa with her efforts and was named Canada's ambassador to the United Nations in 1992.

In 1995, Fréchette left the foreign service to become assistant deputy minister of finance in Ottawa. She was later promoted to deputy minister of national defense, the first woman to hold that position.

=== Deputy Secretary General of the UN ===
In 1997, UN Secretary General Kofi Annan announced a series of reforms at the world body, including the creation of the position of deputy secretary-general to handle many of the administrative responsibilities which had previously been the responsibility of the secretary-general. Fréchette was offered the position and accepted and has been responsible for overseeing numerous reforms at the UN. While at the United Nations, Fréchette – working with her U.S. counterpart Madeleine K. Albright, among others – was pivotal in devising a peacekeeping operation for Haiti with the return from exile of President Jean-Bertrand Aristide in 1994.

In 2005, after being criticized by former U.S. Federal Reserve Chairman Paul Volcker for failed management of the Iraq Oil-for-Food Program, Fréchette announced her resignation.

== Later career ==
Fréchette is a Member of the Global Leadership Foundation and is a member of the International Advisory Board at the Institute for the Study of International Development (ISID) at McGill University. She was a member of the International Atomic Energy Agency (IAEA) Commission of Eminent Persons on nuclear energy challenges which issued its report in April 2008.

== Other activities ==
=== Corporate boards ===
- Essilor, Independent Member of the Board of Directors
- Shell Canada, Independent Member of the Board of Directors (2006–2007)

=== Non-profit organizations ===
- CARE Canada, chair of the Board (since 2011)
- CARE International, Chair of the Supervisory Board
- Global Leadership Foundation (GLF), Member
- International Commission on Nuclear Non-proliferation and Disarmament (ICNND), Member of the Advisory Board
- Montreal Centre for International Studies, Member of the Advisory Board
- Montreal Council on Foreign Relations (MCFR), Member of the Board of Directors

== Recognition ==
In 1998, Fréchette was made an Officer of the Order of Canada.

Diplomatic posts
Preceded by Yves Fortier	Canadian Ambassador to the United Nations; 1992–1994	Succeeded by Robert Fowler
Positions in intergovernmental organisations
New office	Deputy Secretary-General of the United Nations; 1998–2006	Succeeded by (United Kingdom) Mark Malloch Brown
