= Delivering as One =

United Nations report

Delivering as One is a United Nations report established by the then UN secretary-general Kofi Annan in 2005 on the topics of development assistance, humanitarian aid and environmental issues. The panel issued its report in November 2006, and sets out a program of reform of the UN's development operations. It focuses on four main principles: One Leader, One Budget, One Programme and One Office. This effort is mostly led by the United Nations Development Group, a group of 32 United Nations specialised agencies working on International Development issues. As a result, countries — both Government and UN partners — have undertaken efforts to work together more effectively and efficiently. Eight countries—Albania, Cape Verde, Mozambique, Pakistan, Rwanda, Tanzania, Uruguay, and Viet Nam—volunteered to be pilots for the initiative.

== See also ==
- United Nations Sustainable Development Group
- Reform of the United Nations
