= Amina J. Mohammed =

Deputy Secretary-General of the United Nations since 2017

Her Excellency Amina J. Mohammed GCON
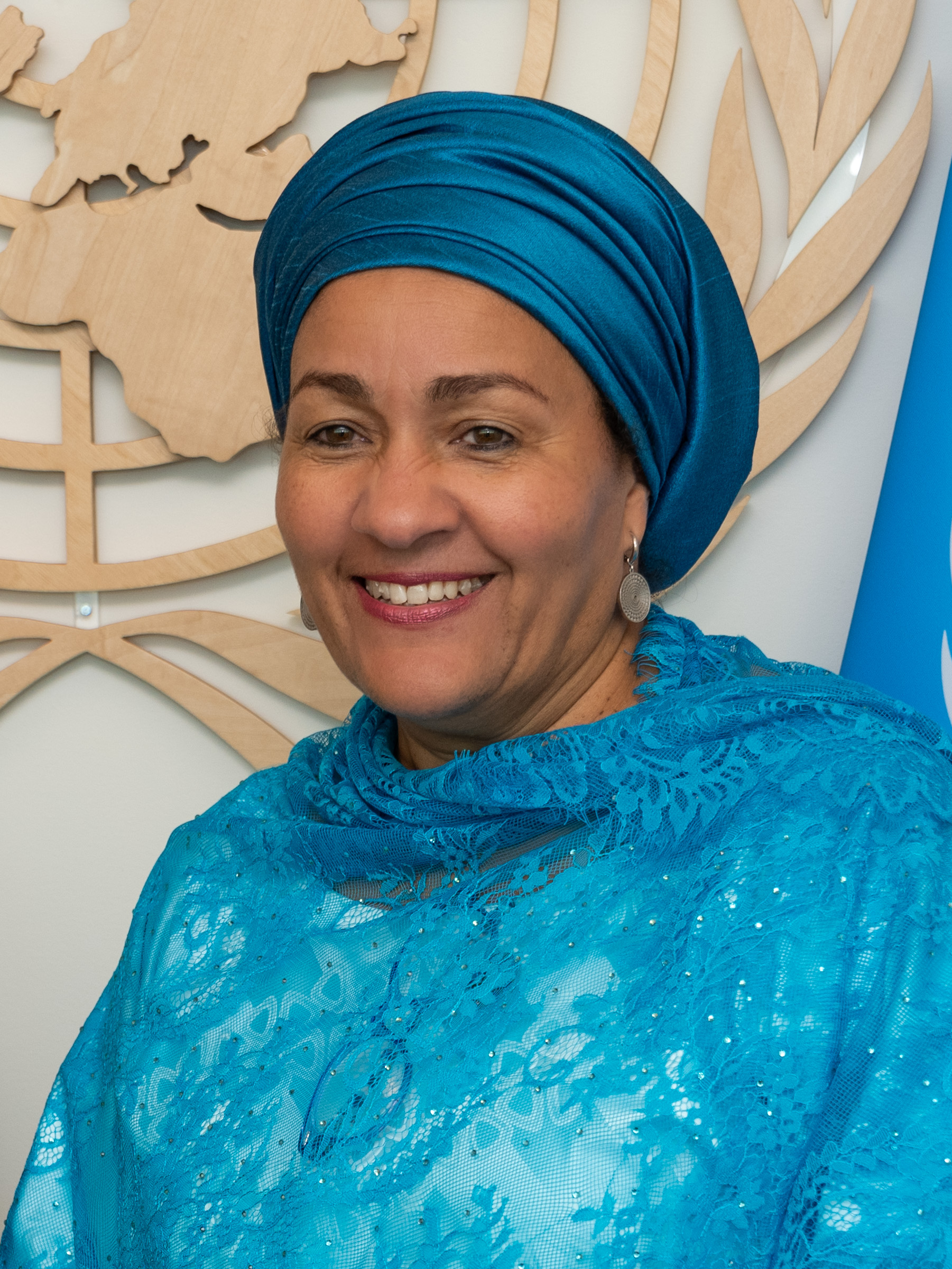
- Mohammed in 2023

5th Deputy Secretary-General of the United Nations
- Incumbent
- Assumed office 1 January 2017
- Secretary-General: António Guterres
- Preceded by: Jan Eliasson

Minister of Environment of Nigeria
- In office 11 November 2015 – 15 December 2016
- President: Muhammadu Buhari
- Preceded by: Lawrencia Laraba-Mallam
- Succeeded by: Ibrahim Usman Jibril

Personal details
- Born: Amina Jane Mohammed; 27 June 1961 (age 65) Liverpool, England
- Citizenship: Nigeria; United Kingdom
- Children: Nadine Ibrahim
- Education: Henley Management College

Amina Jane Mohammed GCON (born 27 June 1961) is a Nigerian-British diplomat and politician who is serving as the 5th Deputy Secretary-General of the United Nations. Previously, she was Nigerian Minister of Environment from 2015 to 2016 and was a player in the Post-2015 Development Agenda process. She is also Chair of United Nations Sustainable Development Group.

== Early life and education ==
Amina Jane Mohammed was born in Liverpool, England, on 27 June 1961 to a Fulani Nigerian veterinarian-officer and a British nurse. She is the eldest of five daughters.

Mohammed attended a primary school in Kaduna and Maiduguri in Nigeria and The Buchan School on the Isle of Man. She further attended Henley Management College in 1989 but she does not hold a formal bachelor's degree. After she finished her studies her father asked that she return to Nigeria.

== Career ==
Between 1981 and 1991, Mohammed worked with Archcon Nigeria, an architectural design firm in association with Norman and Dawbarn United Kingdom. She founded Afri-Projects Consortium in 1991 and served as its Executive Director until 2001.

From 2002 until 2005, Mohammed coordinated the Task Force on Gender and Education for the United Nations Millennium Project.

Mohammed later acted as the Senior Special Assistant to the President of Nigeria on the Millennium Development Goals (MDGs). In 2005, she was charged with the coordination of Nigeria's debt relief funds toward the achievement of the Millennium Development Goals, MDGs. Her mandate included designing a Virtual Poverty Fund with innovative approaches to poverty reduction, budget coordination and monitoring, as well as providing advice on pertinent issues regarding poverty, public sector reform and sustainable development.

Amina Mohammed later became the founder and CEO of the Center for Development Policy Solutions and an adjunct professor in the Master's in Development Practice program at Columbia University. During that time, she served on numerous international advisory boards and panels, including the United Nations, UN Secretary-General's High-level Panel on Post-2015 Development Agenda and the Independent Expert Advisory Group on the Data Revolution for Sustainable Development. She also chaired the Advisory Board of the United Nations Educational, Scientific and Cultural Organization (UNESCO) Global Monitoring Report on Education (GME).

From 2012, Mohammed was a key player in the Post-2015 Development Agenda process, serving as the Special Adviser to UN Secretary-General Ban Ki-moon on Post-2015 development planning. In this role, she acted as the link between the Secretary-General, his High Level Panel of Eminent Persons (HLP), and the General Assembly’s Open Working Group (OWG), among other stakeholders. From 2014, she also served on the Secretary-General's Independent Expert Advisory Group on the Data Revolution for Sustainable Development.

=== Minister of the Environment (2015–2017) ===
Mohammed served as Federal Minister of the Environment in the First Cabinet of President Muhammadu Buhari from November 2015 to February 2017. During that time, she was Nigeria's representative in the African Union (AU) Reform Steering Committee, chaired by Paul Kagame. She resigned from the Nigerian Federal Executive Council, on 24 February 2017.

In 2017, Mohammed was accused by an advocacy group of granting illegal permits to Chinese firms to import endangered Nigerian timber during her term as Nigeria's environment minister. The Nigerian government has denied the claims.

=== Deputy Secretary-General of the United Nations (2017–present) ===
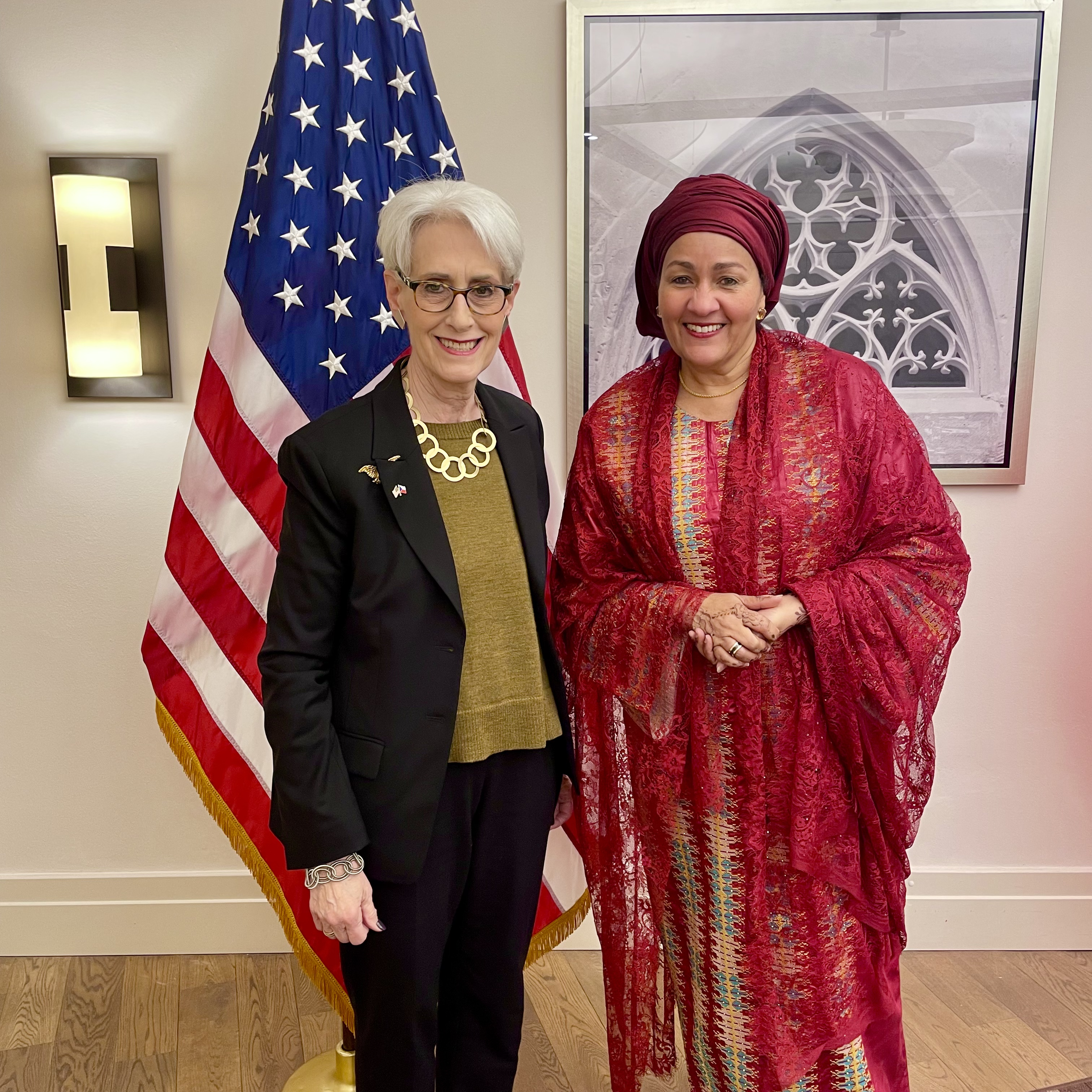
Mohammed with US Deputy Secretary of State Wendy Sherman in 2022

In January 2017, United Nations Secretary-General António Guterres announced his intention to appoint Mohammed Deputy Secretary-General of the United Nations. In this capacity, she is a member of the UN Interagency Coordination Group on Antimicrobial Resistance (IACG).

== Other activities ==
- Africa Europe Foundation (AEF), Member of the High-Level Group of Personalities on Africa-Europe Relations (since 2020)
- Global Partnership for Sustainable Development Data, member of the Board of Directors (since 2017)
- ActionAid, International Right to Education Project, member of the Advisory Board
- Bill & Melinda Gates Foundation, Member of the Global Development Program's Advisory Board.
- Hewlett Foundation, member of the Board
- International Development Research Centre, member of the Board of Governors
- International Gender Champions (IGC), Member
- Institute of Scientific and Technical Information of China (ISTIC), member of the Advisory Board
- World Economic Forum's Young Global Leaders, member of the Board

== Recognition ==
- 2006 – Order of the Federal Republic
- 2007 – Nigerian Women's Hall of Fame
- 2015 – Ford Family Notre Dame Award for International Development and Solidarity
- 2017 – Diplomat of the Year Awards
- 2018 – Sarraounia chieftaincy title of Niger in 2018, installed by that country's Kings
- 2018 – BBC 100 Women for her work as deputy secretary general of the United Nations
- 2019 – Global Citizen Prize World Leader Award
- 2022 – Nigerian national honour Grand Commander of the Order of the Niger (GCON)

== Personal life ==
Mohammed's daughter, Nadine Ibrahim, is a film director.

Mohammed is a Muslim.

== The Amina Mohammed Skills Acquisition Centre ==
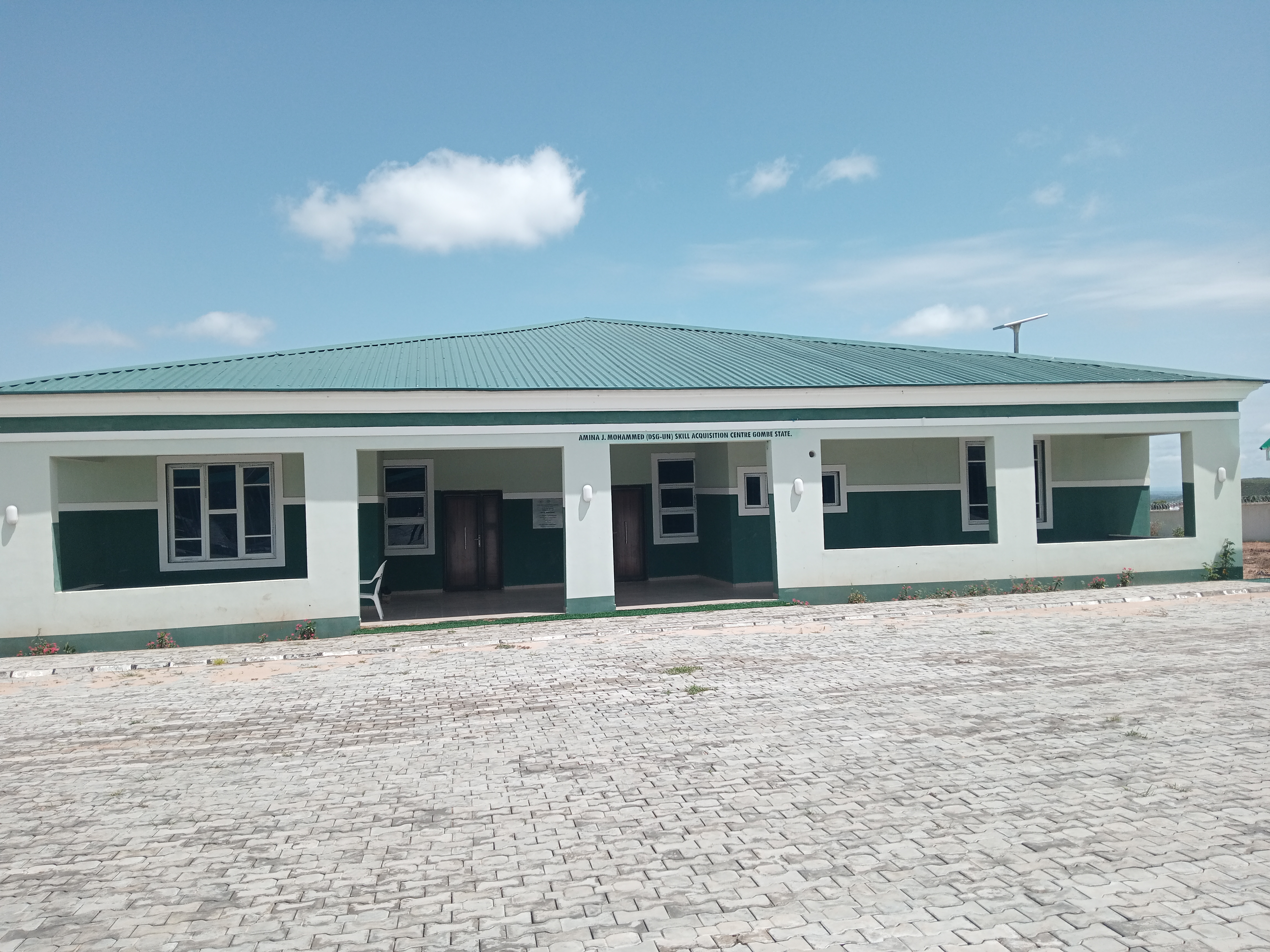
The Amina J Muhammed Skills Acquisition Centre

The Amina Mohammed Skills Acquisition Centre which is located along the Gombe bye-pass was constructed by the SDGs in partnership with the Government of Gombe in order to honour the Deputy Secretary General of the United Nations, Hajiya Amina Mohammed's contributions to social, political and cultural boundaries. The skills acquisition centre named after her seeks to offer instruments for economic empowerment and also to provide various life-skills trainings for young people in many areas of life.

== Bibliography ==
- Kabir, Hajara Muhammad,. Northern women development. [Nigeria]. ISBN 978-978-906-469-4. OCLC 890820657.

Positions in intergovernmental organisations
Preceded by (Sweden) Jan Eliasson	Deputy Secretary-General of the United Nations; 2017–present	Incumbent
