= Mark Malloch Brown =

British diplomat and former politician (born 1953)

The Right Honourable The Lord Malloch-Brown KCMG PC
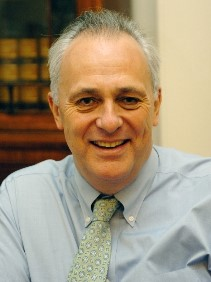
- Official portrait, 2007

Minister of State for Africa and the United Nations
- In office 28 June 2007 – 24 July 2009
- Prime Minister: Gordon Brown
- Preceded by: Brian Wilson (Note: Office vacant between 11 June 2001 and 28 June 2007.)
- Succeeded by: The Baroness Kinnock of Holyhead

2nd Deputy Secretary-General of the United Nations
- In office 1 April 2006 – 31 December 2006
- Secretary‑General: Kofi Annan
- Preceded by: Louise Fréchette
- Succeeded by: Asha-Rose Migiro

Administrator of the United Nations Development Programme
- In office 1 July 1999 – 15 August 2005
- Secretary‑General: Kofi Annan
- Preceded by: James Speth
- Succeeded by: Kemal Derviş

Member of the House of Lords
- Lord Temporal
- Life peerage 9 July 2007

Personal details
- Born: George Mark Malloch Brown; 16 September 1953 (age 73) London, England, UK
- Party: Labour (former); Crossbench
- Spouse: Trish Cronan (m. 1989)
- Children: 4
- Education: Magdalene College, Cambridge (BA); University of Michigan, Ann Arbor (MA)

George Mark Malloch Brown, Baron Malloch-Brown, (Note: His title is hyphenated but his surname is not.) KCMG, PC (born 16 September 1953) is a British diplomat, communications consultant, journalist and former politician. He served as president of the Open Society Foundations from 2021 to 2024. Malloch Brown previously served as Deputy Secretary-General of the United Nations under Kofi Annan from April to December 2006. A former member of the Labour Party, he served as Minister of State for Africa and the United Nations in the Brown government from 2007 to 2009.

Born in Marylebone, Malloch Brown studied at Magdalene College, Cambridge and the University of Michigan. He was a political correspondent for The Economist between 1977 and 1979 and then worked for the office of the United Nations High Commissioner for Refugees from 1979 to 1983. After acting as a lead international partner at American public relations firm Sawyer-Miller, he was a development specialist at the World Bank from 1994 to 1999, administrator of the United Nations Development Programme from 1999 to 2005 and United Nations Deputy Secretary-General from April to December 2006.

Malloch Brown joined the government of Gordon Brown in 2007 at the Foreign and Commonwealth Office and was elevated to the House of Lords as a life peer. After stepping down from the government in 2009 due to family and personal reasons, he was appointed chairman of global affairs for FTI Consulting a year later. In 2014, he was appointed chairman of the board of directors of election technology manufacturer Smartmatic's holding company. He served as president of Open Society Foundations from January 2021 until June 2024.

== Early life and career ==
Malloch Brown was born in 1953 in Marylebone, the only son of an exiled South African diplomat. He was educated at Marlborough College, and earned a First Class Honours Degree in History from Magdalene College, Cambridge and a master's degree in political science from the University of Michigan.

Malloch Brown was the political correspondent at The Economist between 1977 and 1979. Following this he worked for the United Nations High Commissioner for Refugees from 1979 to 1983, where he worked for Kofi Annan, and was stationed in Thailand (1979 to 1981) where he was in charge of field operations for Cambodian refugees and supervised the construction of camps at Sa Kaeo and Khao-I-Dang. In this period the United Nations High Commissioner for Refugees was awarded the 1981 Nobel Peace Prize, the second time it had been awarded the prize. In 1983, he returned to The Economist as the founding editor of the Economist Development Report, a position he retained until 1986.

Malloch Brown contemplated running for the Social Democratic Party at the 1983 United Kingdom general election but was not selected as a candidate.

== Sawyer-Miller (1986–1994) ==
Malloch Brown was the lead international partner at the US-based Sawyer-Miller Group communications consultancy from 1986 to 1994; he ultimately co-owned the Group with three other partners. The Group was among the first communication consultants to use US-style election campaign methods for foreign governments, companies, and public policy debates. Malloch Brown "worked extensively on privatisation and other economic reform issues with leaders in Eastern Europe and Russia".

Malloch Brown focused much of his public relations energies on advising politicians in Latin America. He advised Gonzalo Sánchez de Lozada's 1989 presidential campaign in Bolivia. In Peru, he assisted Mario Vargas Llosa with his 1990 presidential campaign, though Vargas Llosa did not heed his advice and lost to Alberto Fujimori despite having an initial lead in polls. In Chile, Malloch Brown advised the opposition in its successful challenge to former dictator Augusto Pinochet. In Colombia, he advised the government on how to shed "its image as the political wing of the Medellin cartel"

In the Philippines, Malloch Brown worked with Corazon Aquino in the campaign against Ferdinand Marcos. Malloch Brown wrote Aquino's victory speech which she recited days before voting results were to be released since her campaign assumed that Marcos claim victory as well. He stated that an "outstanding accomplishment during the Cory campaign was to produce an exit poll that indicated that she had won".

== World Bank (1994–1999) ==
In 1994, Malloch Brown joined the World Bank as Vice-President for External Affairs, which included responsibility for relations with the United Nations. He used his experience to good effect at the bank, helping to transform its reputation: "under his guidance, the bank blitzed opinion-makers with full-page newspaper advertisements and a television campaign to change perceptions of it as an arrogant institution unwilling to heed outsiders. To his credit, the institution gradually gained a reputation as a 'listening bank', unlike its more aloof sister institution, the International Monetary Fund."

== United Nations (1999–2006) ==
Malloch Brown moved back to the United Nations as Administrator of the United Nations Development Programme (UNDP) in July 1999, remaining in this position until August 2005.

He led the UN's creation of the Millennium Development Goals which were adopted at the UN Millennium Summit in December 2000, later recounting the draft had gone to the printers without an environmental goal when Malloch Brown passed the head of the UN environment programme in a corridor, leading to the rapid addition of MDG number 7.

While serving as United Nations Development Programme Administrator, Malloch Brown spoke beside George Soros in 2002 suggesting that the United Nations and Soros's Open Society Institute, as well as other organizations, work together to fund humanitarian functions.

In late 2002, Malloch Brown offered to assist talks between Hugo Chavez's Bolivarian government and the opposition, who was seeking to begin the process of attempting to recall Chávez a year later. His UNDP observers were chosen by Venezuela's National Electoral Council (CNE) to supervise the signature collection for the 2004 Venezuela recall.

In this role Malloch Brown co-ordinated the UN's response to the 2004 Indian Ocean earthquake and tsunami.

In January 2005 he was appointed Chef de Cabinet to UN Secretary-General Kofi Annan, whilst retaining his position as Administrator of UNDP for much of 2005.

Malloch Brown was listed 7th in the Leaders and Revolutionaries section of the Time 100 in 2005.

=== Deputy Secretary-General (2006) ===
Malloch Brown succeeded Louise Fréchette as United Nations Deputy Secretary-General on 1 April 2006, retaining the position until December 2006.

In 2006, he was named a visiting fellow at the Yale Center for the Study of Globalization and announced plans to focus on writing a book on changing leadership in a globalised world while in residence during the spring semester.

==== Oil for food ====
Malloch Brown publicly defended the handling of the Oil-for-Food Programme by the UN in general, and Kofi Annan in particular. While he countered critics that "Not a penny was lost from the organization," an internal UN audit of the Oil-for-Food programme revealed that there had been overcompensation amounting to $557 million. A separate audit of UN peacekeeping procurement concluded that at least $310 million from a budget of $1.6 billion could not be accounted for.

Malloch Brown, briefing the Security Council, argued that, while the situation uncovered by the audit was "alarming", and that nearly $300 million out of a $1.6 billion budget was involved, it showed more that there was significant waste with only narrow instances of fraud. He noted that the UN Secretariat, based on the reservations expressed by the department being audited, did not entirely accept the auditor's conclusions.

==== Criticisms of the George W. Bush administration ====
On 6 June 2006, while addressing a conference in New York City, he criticised the United States administration for allowing "too much unchecked UN-bashing and stereotyping". He stated that much of the political dialogue in the US about the UN had been abdicated to its most strident critics, such as conservative talk-show host Rush Limbaugh and the Fox News cable channel and, as a result of this, the true role and value of the UN has become "a mystery in Middle America". These remarks resulted in a backlash from the White House and some US conservative commentators, culminating in a call for an apology by the US envoy to the United Nations John Bolton. Bolton added to reporters, "I spoke to the secretary-general this morning, I said "I've known you since 1989 and I'm telling you this is the worst mistake by a senior U.N. official that I have seen in that entire time."

John Podesta and Richard C. Leone wrote that Bolton's comment "distorted Mr. Malloch Brown's remarks by calling them an attack on 'the American people', and ... by conflating Rush Limbaugh and Fox News with the American people. ... Mr. Malloch Brown had to break with the niceties of diplomatic tradition to plead for such leadership. ... Mr. Malloch Brown is surely correct: the people of the United States deserve better leadership and diplomacy to represent their interests in the world’s most important international body." Malloch Brown himself rejected the need to apologise and received the support of Secretary-General Kofi Annan, who said that his deputy's comments "should be read in the right spirit".

In July 2006, during the Israel-Hezbollah crisis in Lebanon, Malloch Brown said America should allow others to "share the lead" in solving the Lebanon crisis and also advised that Britain adopt a lower profile in solving the crisis, lest the international community see the negotiations as being led by the same team that instigated the invasion of Iraq. These comments again drew criticism from some American officials, including the US State Department, a spokesman who stated "We are seeing a troubling pattern of a high official of the UN who seems to be making it his business to criticize member states and, frankly, with misplaced and misguided criticisms."

Malloch Brown responded in an interview with PBS:

"I don't think the US has anything to object to in the comments. I was really in fact in the interview calling for the US to reach out to France and others to make sure it was demonstrating a broad multilateral coalition and within a single news cycle of my calling for that, it was doing it." He added "I may be prophetic but I wasn't critical".

When Bolton later announced his own resignation in early December, Malloch Brown made his delight clear, telling reporters "No comment – and you can say he said it with a smile".

In May 2007, George Soros's Quantum Fund announced the appointment of Malloch Brown as vice-president. He was named vice-chairman of Soros Fund Management and the Open Society Institute, two other important Soros organisations.

== Political career (2007–2009) ==
On 27 June 2007, it was announced Malloch Brown was joining the government of incoming Prime Minister Gordon Brown as Minister of State for Africa and the United Nations at the Foreign and Commonwealth Office (FCO). Following his appointment, he was created a life peer on 9 July 2007 as Baron Malloch-Brown, of St Leonard's Forest in the County of West Sussex. He was also appointed to the Privy Council. Plans for his appointment and peerage had been leaked to The Observer in November 2006. At the time, The Daily Telegraph said "While the aid agencies and liberals were still toasting the arrival of 'Saint Mark' to Whitehall, the neo-cons on both sides of the Atlantic were throwing darts at photographs of their devil. [He] divides opinion between those who see him as the great hope for Africa and a principled opponent of the war in Iraq, and those who believe that he is an anti-American egotist who defended Kofi Annan over the oil-for-food scandal." On becoming a government minister, The Observer reported he had resigned his position as vice-chairman of Quantum Fund.

Following the decision by the Scottish Criminal Cases Review Commission (SCCRC) to refer the case of Abdelbaset al-Megrahi back for a second appeal against conviction, Dr Hans Köchler, UN-appointed international observer at the Lockerbie trial, wrote on 4 July 2007 to Malloch Brown reiterating his call for a "full and independent public inquiry of the Lockerbie case". Köchler addressed the letter also to First Minister of Scotland Alex Salmond, Foreign Secretary David Miliband and Home Secretary Jacqui Smith.

In November 2007, the conservative British magazine The Spectator drew some attention with its criticism of the Malloch Brown family's occupancy of a government-owned, so-called "grace and favour" apartment in London, previously used by former Deputy Prime Minister John Prescott. On 18 November 2007, The Sunday Times fuelled the controversy by reporting that "some see the hand of Miliband behind the savaging of Malloch Brown in The Spectator".

On 7 July 2009, Malloch Brown announced he was stepping down from his position as Minister of State for Africa, Asia and the United Nations at the end of July 2009, citing personal and family reasons.

== Post-ministerial career (2010–present) ==
Malloch Brown was appointed chairman of global affairs for FTI Consulting in September 2010. Consultancy appointments to oil companies Vitol and SouthWest Energy Ltd (both approved by the relevant parliamentary committee) were reported in 2010. In 2013, Malloch Brown and FTI Consulting came to a legal settlement with Israeli mining billionaire Beny Steinmetz, who had sued them claiming Malloch Brown had given confidential information to George Soros which led to a smear campaign against Steinmetz's mining company. The out-of-court settlement of €90,000 plus costs was without any determination of liability.

Malloch Brown was a member of The Guardian's global development advisory panel. He contributed to the panel beside U2's Bono, the Center for Economic and Policy Research's Ha-Joon Chang and Mark Weisbrot, Paul Collier and others.

Malloch Brown's book The Unfinished Global Revolution came out early 2011 on Penguin Press. In 2012, Malloch Brown left the Labour Party to sit as a Crossbencher in the House of Lords.

Among his non-governmental and private sector roles, Malloch Brown became chairman of the board of directors of SGO Corporation Limited, a holding company whose primary asset is the election technology and voting machine manufacturer Smartmatic, in 2014. He has also served as chair of the Royal African Society and as a member of the Executive Committee of the International Crisis Group. In July 2014, he became co-chair of the Board of Trustees of the latter organisation.

In December 2020, Malloch Brown was announced as succeeding Patrick Gaspard as president of Open Society Foundations on 1 January 2021. In March 2024, Malloch Brown announced he was stepping down as president.

In September 2025, he was named Distinguished Visiting Fellow with the World Perry House at the University of Pennsylvania.

== Personal life ==
In 1989 Malloch Brown married Trish Cronan, with whom he has four children. He is a close friend of billionaire speculator George Soros, with the two having worked together in their roles at the UN and Open Society Foundations, and he rented an apartment owned by Soros while living with his family in New York working on UN assignments.

== Honours ==
- Malloch Brown was appointed Knight Commander of the Order of St Michael and St George (KCMG) in the 2007 New Year Honours.
- Eminent member, Sergio Vieira de Mello Foundation
- Honorary Patron, University Philosophical Society, Trinity College, Dublin.
- Honorary President, London International Model United Nations Foundation

== Notes ==
Positions in intergovernmental organisations
Preceded by James Speth	Administrator of the United Nations Development Programme; 1999–2005	Succeeded by Kemal Derviş
Preceded by Louise Fréchette	Deputy Secretary-General of the United Nations; 2006	Succeeded by Asha-Rose Migiro
Political offices
Preceded by Brian Wilson; 2001	Minister of State for Africa, Asia and the United Nations; 2007–2009	Succeeded by Glenys Kinnock
Orders of precedence in the United Kingdom
Preceded by The Lord Mawson	Gentlemen; Baron Malloch-Brown	Followed by The Lord West of Spithead
