= Mtama =

Ward in Lindi District, Lindi Region

Mtama Kata ya Chumo (Swahili)
- Ward
- Kata ya Mtama, Wilaya ya Lindi
- Location within Tanzania
- Country: Tanzania
- Region: Lindi Region
- District: Lindi District

Area
  - Total: 36.4 km^{2} (14.1 sq mi)
- Elevation: 185 m (607 ft)

Population (2012)
  - Total: 4,398
  - Density: 121/km^{2} (313/sq mi)

Ethnic groups
  - Settler: Swahili
  - Native: Mwera people
- Tanzanian Postal Code: 65215

Mtama is the district capital and an administrative ward in Lindi District of Lindi Region in Tanzania. The ward covers an area of 36.4 km^{2} (14.1 sq mi), and has an average elevation of 185 m (607 ft). According to the 2022 census, the ward had a population of 5,422.
