= Quadrennial comprehensive policy review =

The Quadrennial comprehensive policy review (QCPR) of the operational system of the United Nations is a process and a United Nations General Assembly resolution by which the 193 members of the United Nations General Assembly (UN GA) review the coherence effectiveness and funding of the 27 UN development programmes, funds, and specialised agencies of the UN operational system for development. This review was conducted on a triennial basis until 2007. Since 2008 it has been conducted on a quadrennial basis.

Typically, the Quadrennial comprehensive policy review covers the following subjects:

- The funding of operational activities of the UN for development including the core funding of its agencies, funds and programmes
- The role of the UN development system in building capacity and fostering development in developing countries
- The responsibility of the UN development system in the global fight against poverty
- The responsibility of the UN development system in promoting South-South cooperation and the development of national capacities
- The importance of placing gender equality and women's empowerment at the center of the agenda of the UN development system
- Guidance to the UN development system on its operations in countries in transition from relief to development
- Instructions to improve the functioning of the UN development system, and particularly the simplification and harmonization of its business practices

The substantive basis for this review is a report by the Secretary-General of the United Nations which is produced by the United Nations Department of Economic and Social Affairs (UN DESA) during the summer preceding the UN GA negotiations. This report is then debated in the second committee of the UN GA. The negotiation of the resolution has historically been chaired by the economic and development counselor of the Permanent Mission of Switzerland to the United Nations (Olivier Chave 2001 and 2004, Thomas Gass 2007, Pio Wennubst 2012).

The implementation of the Quadrennial comprehensive policy review is carried out through the United Nations Economic and Social Council (ECOSOC).
