= Deputy Secretary-General of the United Nations =

Administrative position within the United Nations

- Emblem of the United Nations

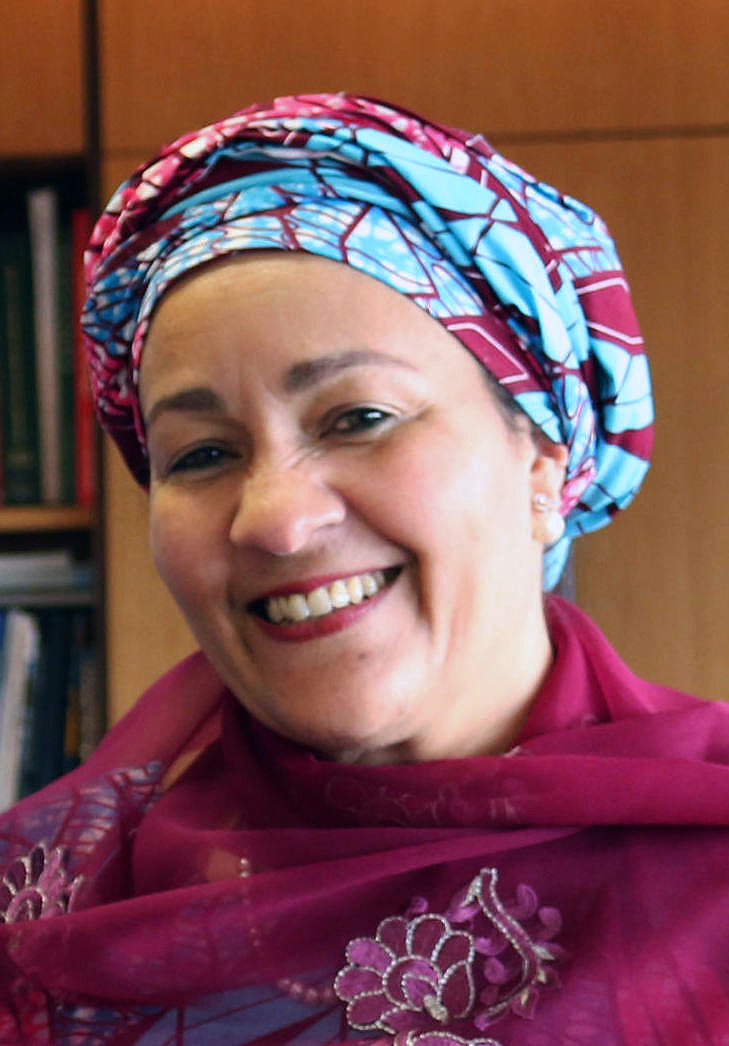
- Incumbent; Amina J. Mohammed since 1 January 2017
- United Nations; United Nations Secretariat
- Style: Her Excellency
- Type: Deputy chief administrative officer
- Reports to: The secretary-general
- Seat: UN Headquarters; New York City (international territory)
- Appointer: The secretary-general following consultations with member states and in accordance with Article 101 of the Charter of the United Nations.
- Term length: See below The term of office of the deputy secretary-general must not exceed that of the secretary-general.
- Constituting instrument: General Assembly Resolution 52/12 B
- Precursor: Deputy Secretary-General of the League of Nations
- Inaugural holder: Louise Fréchette
- Formation: 1997
- Website: Deputy Secretary-General

The deputy secretary-general of the United Nations is the deputy to the secretary-general of the United Nations. The office was created to handle many of the administrative responsibilities of the secretary-general, help manage Secretariat operations, and ensure coherence of activities and programs. The post was formally established by the General Assembly at the end of 1997.

Amina J. Mohammed of Nigeria was named as deputy secretary-general by then secretary-general-designate António Guterres. Mohammed assumed the office the same day as Guterres began his term, on 1 January 2017.

== Responsibilities ==
Responsibilities generally delegated by the secretary-general to the deputy secretary-general include:

(a) To assist the Secretary-General in managing the operations of the Secretariat;
(b) To act for the Secretary-General at United Nations Headquarters in the absence of the Secretary-General and in other cases as may be decided by the Secretary-General;
(c) To support the Secretary-General in ensuring inter-sectoral and inter-institutional coherence of activities and programs and to support the Secretary-General in elevating the profile and leadership of the United Nations in the economic and social spheres, including further efforts to strengthen the United Nations as a leading centre for development policy and development assistance;
(d) To represent the Secretary-General at conferences, official functions and ceremonial and other occasions as may be decided by the Secretary-General;
(e) To undertake such assignments as may be determined by the Secretary-General;

The director in the Office of the Deputy Secretary-General is a sitting observer of the United Nations Development Group.

== History ==
Canadian Louise Fréchette was the first deputy secretary-general of the United Nations, holding the position from 1998 to 2005. She was appointed to the post by Secretary-General Kofi Annan and assumed her duties on 2 March 1998. In 2005, partly in response to criticism by former U.S. Federal Reserve Chairman Paul Volcker for failed management of the Iraq Oil-for-Food Programme, Frechette announced her resignation. She remained at her post until 31 March 2006.

On 3 March 2006 it was announced that Mark Malloch Brown from the United Kingdom would succeed Louise Fréchette as deputy secretary-general on 1 April 2006. Brown left his post concurrent with Kofi Annan's departure as secretary-general on 31 December 2006.

== List of deputy secretaries-general ==
No.	Portrait	Deputy Secretary-General	Country	Term	Secretary-General
1		Louise Fréchette	Canada	2 March 1998 – 1 April 2006	(Ghana) Kofi Annan
2		Mark Malloch Brown	United Kingdom	1 April 2006 – 31 December 2006	(Ghana) Kofi Annan
3		Asha-Rose Migiro	Tanzania	5 February 2007 – 1 July 2012	(South Korea) Ban Ki-moon
4		Jan Eliasson	Sweden	1 July 2012 – 31 December 2016	(South Korea) Ban Ki-moon
5		Amina J. Mohammed	Nigeria	1 January 2017 – present	(Portugal) António Guterres

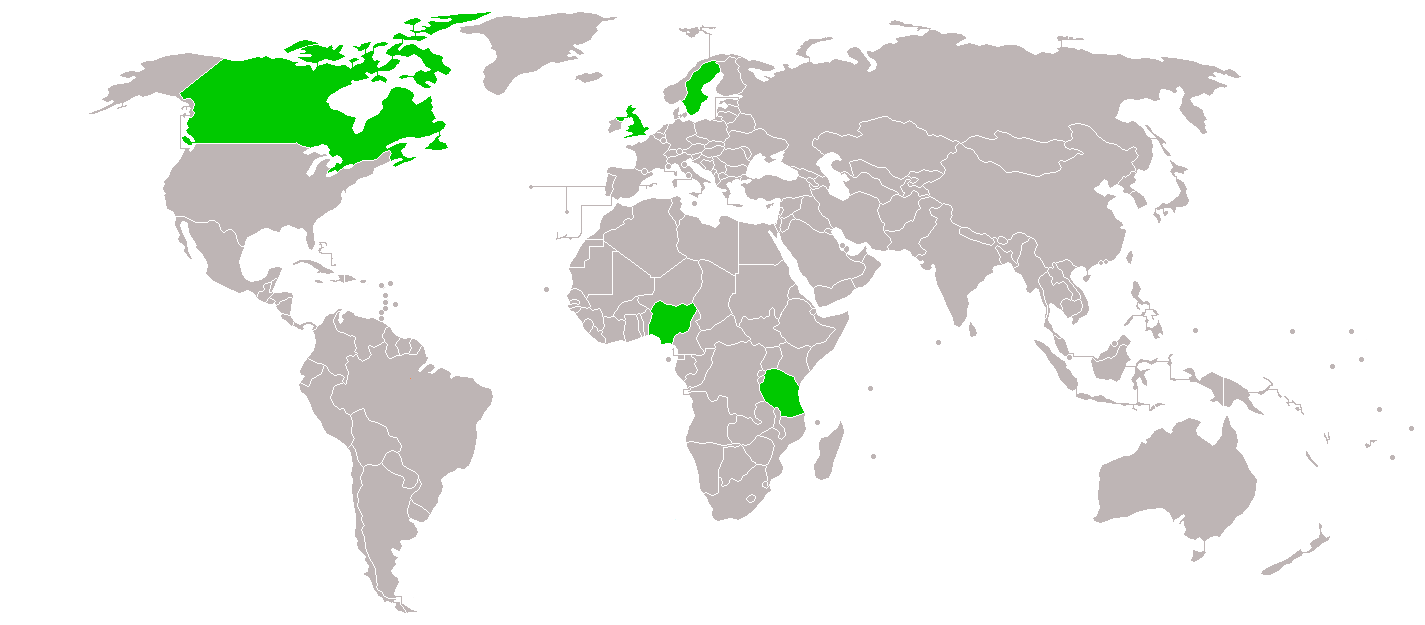
Countries that have had a national serve as deputy secretary-general of the United Nations.

UN Regional Group	Deputy Secretaries-General
African Group	2
Asia-Pacific Group	0
Eastern European Group	0
Latin American and Caribbean Group	0
Western European and Others Group	3
