= Gareth Evans (politician) =

Australian politician (born 1944)

The Honourable Gareth Evans AC KC FASSA FAIIA
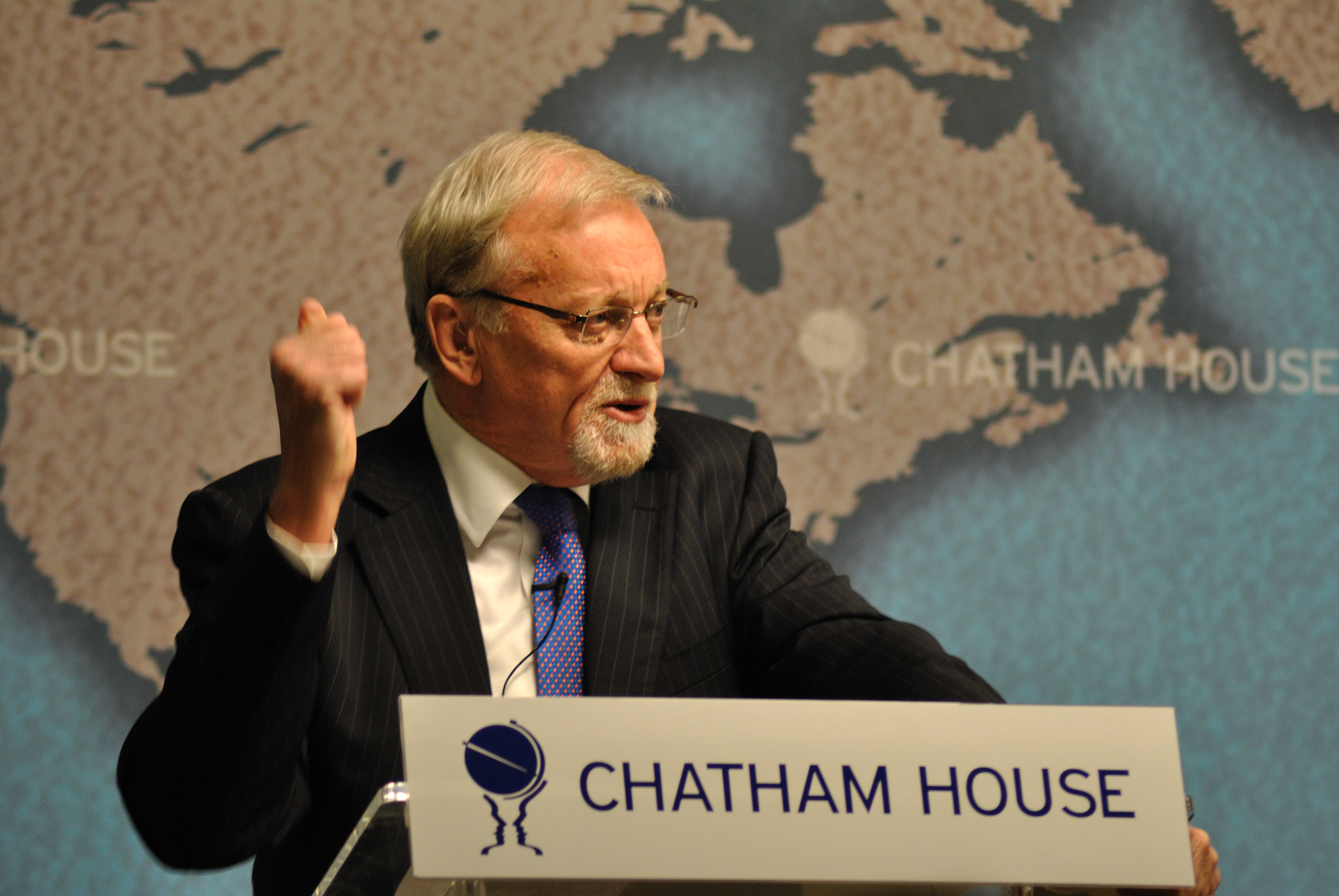
- Evans at Chatham House in 2011

Chancellor of Australian National University
- In office 1 January 2010 – 1 January 2020
- Preceded by: Kim Beazley
- Succeeded by: Julie Bishop

Deputy Leader of the Opposition
- In office 19 March 1996 – 19 October 1998
- Leader: Kim Beazley
- Preceded by: Peter Costello
- Succeeded by: Simon Crean

Deputy Leader of the Labor Party
- In office 19 March 1996 – 19 October 1998
- Leader: Kim Beazley
- Preceded by: Kim Beazley
- Succeeded by: Simon Crean

Leader of the Government in the Senate
- In office 24 March 1993 – 11 March 1996
- Prime Minister: Paul Keating
- Deputy: Robert Ray
- Preceded by: John Button
- Succeeded by: Robert Hill

Minister for Foreign Affairs
- In office 2 September 1988 – 11 March 1996
- Prime Minister: Bob Hawke; Paul Keating
- Preceded by: Bill Hayden
- Succeeded by: Alexander Downer

Minister for Transport and Communications
- In office 24 July 1987 – 2 September 1988
- Prime Minister: Bob Hawke
- Preceded by: Peter Morris
- Succeeded by: Ralph Willis

Minister for Resources and Energy
- In office 13 December 1984 – 24 July 1987
- Prime Minister: Bob Hawke
- Preceded by: Peter Walsh
- Succeeded by: John Kerin

Attorney-General of Australia
- In office 11 March 1983 – 13 December 1984
- Prime Minister: Bob Hawke
- Preceded by: Peter Durack
- Succeeded by: Lionel Bowen

Member of the Australian Parliament for Holt
- In office 2 March 1996 – 30 September 1999
- Preceded by: Michael Duffy
- Succeeded by: Anthony Byrne

Senator for Victoria
- In office 1 July 1978 – 2 March 1996
- Succeeded by: Stephen Conroy

Personal details
- Born: Gareth John Evans; 5 September 1944 (age 82) Melbourne, Victoria, Australia
- Party: Labor
- Spouse: Merran Evans
- Children: Caitlin Evans; Eamon Evans
- Education: University of Melbourne; Magdalen College, Oxford
- Profession: Academic, barrister
- Website: gevans.org

Gareth John Evans (born 5 September 1944) is an Australian politician, international policymaker, academic, and barrister. He represented the Labor Party in the Senate and House of Representatives from 1978 to 1999, serving as a Cabinet Minister in the Hawke and Keating governments from 1983 to 1996 as Attorney-General, Minister for Resources and Energy, Minister for Transport and Communications and most prominently, from 1988 to 1996, as Minister for Foreign Affairs. He was Leader of the Government in the Senate from 1993 to 1996, Deputy Leader of the Opposition from 1996 to 1998, and remains one of the two longest-serving federal Cabinet Ministers in Labor Party history. (Note: Ralph Willis is the other. Of the others holding ministerial office at the beginning and end of the Hawke/Keating governments, Kim Beazley and Brian Howe were initially in the outer Ministry, not Cabinet, and Paul Keating retired for a time to the back bench.)

After leaving politics, he was president and chief executive officer of the Brussels-based International Crisis Group from 2000 to 2009. On returning to Australia he was appointed in 2009 honorary professorial fellow at the University of Melbourne. He has served on a number of major international commissions and panels, including as co-chair of the International Commission on Intervention and State Sovereignty (2000–01) and the International Commission on Nuclear Non-proliferation and Disarmament (2008–10). Evans has written extensively on international relations and legal, constitutional and political affairs, and has been internationally recognised for his contributions to the theory and practice of mass atrocity and conflict prevention, arms control and disarmament.

From 2010 to 2020, Evans was the Chancellor of the Australian National University (ANU). He was appointed an Honorary Professorial Fellow at the ANU in 2012.

== Early life and education ==
Evans was born in Melbourne, Victoria. His Welsh father was a tram driver, and his mother, who had been a wartime Woolworths supermarket manager, ran a small baby-wear business from home. He was educated at Hawthorn West Central School (1950–1957); Melbourne High School, where he was school captain (1958–1961); the University of Melbourne (1962–1967) where he graduated with a Bachelor of Arts and Bachelor of Laws with First-Class Honours, sharing the Supreme Court Prize, was a Member of the Melbourne University Law Review and was President of the Students Representative Council from 1964 to 1966; and Magdalen College, Oxford (1968–1970), where he attended on a Shell scholarship and graduated with a Master of Arts with First-Class Honours in Philosophy, Politics and Economics (PPE).

== Career ==
In 2004, he was elected an Honorary Fellow of Magdalen College, his alma mater at Oxford.

From 1971 to 1976, he was a law academic at the University of Melbourne, teaching crime, torts, civil liberties law and federal constitutional law, and becoming a prominent commentator on legal issues, especially at the time of the dismissal of the Whitlam Government in 1975. In 1977 he edited Labor and the Constitution 1972–75, a collection of essays on constitutional issues arising during the life of the Whitlam government, and later co-authored Australia's Constitution, arguing for major constitutional reforms. From 1976 to his entry into the Parliament he practised full-time as a barrister, specialising in industrial law, and appellate argument, and became a Queen's Counsel (in Victoria and the ACT) in 1983.

Evans was active in civil liberties issues from his student days on, campaigning on issues such as censorship, capital punishment, the White Australia policy, apartheid and abortion law reform. He was a long-serving vice-president of the Victorian Council for Civil Liberties (now Liberty Victoria), and an active executive member of the Victorian Aboriginal Legal Service.

During the Whitlam Labor government, he acted as a consultant to Aboriginal Affairs Minister Gordon Bryant, advising on Indigenous land rights and legal services issues, and Attorney-General Lionel Murphy, where he was closely involved in drafting the Racial Discrimination Act 1975 and the (unsuccessful) Human Rights Bill 1973. He was appointed by Murphy as a foundation member of the Australian Law Reform Commission, chaired by Justice Michael Kirby, and was primarily responsible for the commission's 1975 report on Criminal Investigation.

Evans joined the Australian Labor Party while at University of Melbourne and became actively involved after his return from Oxford in 1975, joining the centrist Labor Unity faction and working closely with its leaders including Clyde Holding, Peter Redlich and Ian Turner – and Bob Hawke, whose ambition to lead the party he strongly supported. He was an unsuccessful Labor candidate for the Senate in 1975, but was elected in 1977 and took his seat in 1978.

== Parliamentary and ministerial career ==
=== Opposition, 1978–1983 ===
As a young backbencher, Evans was one of the two parliamentarians chosen to sit – along with international architects I. M. Pei and John Andrews – on the Parliament House Competition Assessment Panel which in 1980 chose the winning design for the new Australian Parliament House.

In his first years in the Senate, Evans focused strongly on legal and constitutional reform issues, attracting early attention with his series of attacks on Sir Garfield Barwick, for potential conflict of interest between his role as the Chief Justice of the High Court and his involvement in his family company Mundroola. After the October 1980 election Evans was promoted to the Opposition front bench in 1980, becoming Shadow Attorney-General.

Evans played an active part in ALP National Conferences during this period, seeking to modernise the party's platform, in particular the language of the "socialist objective", and within the Parliamentary Party in developing a detailed "transition to government" strategy. He supported Bob Hawke's leadership challenge against Bill Hayden in 1982, which led ultimately to Hayden resigning just hours before Malcolm Fraser announced the March 1983 election and Hawke leading Labor to victory.

=== Attorney-General, 1983–1984 ===
As Attorney-General, Evans undertook a large agenda for law reform on a range of issues. He immediately ran into controversy, arranging for the Royal Australian Air Force to take surveillance photos of the Franklin Dam project in Tasmania. The Hawke government was pledged to (and ultimately did) stop the project, over the objections of the Tasmanian Liberal government, on the ground that it endangered a World Heritage listed area. The Hawke government was accused of misusing the RAAF for domestic political purposes, and Evans's use of RAAF planes led to his earning the nickname "Biggles", after Captain W. E. Johns's fictional aviation hero – a self-inflicted wound, following his remark to journalists at the time "whatever you do, don't call me Biggles". This incident also led to Evans coining the expression "streaker's defence" (i.e. "it seemed like a good idea at the time"), which has entered the Australian vocabulary. More serious controversy surrounded the Government's handling of national security issues including the Combe-Ivanov affair and the attempted suppression of publication of leaked documents by journalist Brian Toohey, and the allegations of impropriety made against High Court Justice Lionel Murphy, all of which created stress for Evans as an avowed civil libertarian. He achieved a number of reforms, including the establishment of the Commonwealth Director of Public Prosecutions and the National Crime Authority, the strengthening of the Family Law and Freedom of Information Act, and some business regulation changes, but failed in his attempts to achieve uniform national defamation law, a legislative bill of rights, and constitutional reform. In a demotion following this mixed record, Hawke moved him to the less sensitive portfolio of Resources and Energy after the 1984 election.

=== Resources, energy, transport and communications, 1984–1988 ===
In the two major industry portfolios he held over the next five years, Evans was generally perceived as playing himself back into the government mainstream. As Minister for Resources and Energy from 1984 to 1987 he won industry support for his role in rescuing the huge North West Shelf gas project from possible collapse, managing the Australian fallout from the crash in world oil prices in 1986, and seeking to strike a workable balance, between resource sector and competing interests, on uranium mining, the environment and Aboriginal land rights.

In February 1987, shortly after his appointment as Manager of Government Business in the Senate, Evans caused controversy by making comments comparing a Senate debate to rape, stating "that if rape is inevitable, one might as well if not enjoy it, at least succumb with such grace as one can muster in the circumstances". His ALP colleague Susan Ryan asked him to withdraw the comment, but he refused to do so. The Canberra Rape Crisis Centre requested that Evans apologise and staged a protest in the public gallery of the Senate two days later. On the same day, Evans caused further controversy by comparing three female Liberal senators to a half-back line and stated that they were among "things [that] frighten me". In a personal explanation to the Senate he said his remarks were a throwaway line and that he "did not say, nor would I ever say, in jest or otherwise, that rape could ever be enjoyed".

As Transport and Communications minister in 1987–88, he was involved in controversy with the Australian Broadcasting Commission over funding guarantees and charter reform, but primarily concerned with issues at the heart of the government's micro-economic strategy: major airline deregulation, and the reform of government business enterprises in the telecommunications and other sectors, designed to corporatise their commercial practices, as a necessary prelude to the privatisation that later followed.

=== Minister for Foreign Affairs, 1988–1996 ===
Evans was appointed Foreign Minister in September 1988, after his predecessor Bill Hayden resigned to become Governor-General. He held the position for seven years and six months, the longest-serving Labor minister in that portfolio since Evatt. He became a well-known Foreign Minister and highly regarded internationally, and continues to be regarded as one of Australia's most successful. The Hawke and Keating governments were committed to shifting emphasis from Australia's traditional relationships with the United States and the United Kingdom to increased involvement with Asian neighbours, particularly Indonesia and China, and were strongly committed to multilateral diplomacy both globally and regionally.

Evans brought a strongly structured and analytical approach to foreign policymaking and is credited with significant innovative thinking in his articulation, in particular, of the concepts of middle power and niche diplomacy, "good international citizenship" as a national interest, and cooperative security (see "Contributions to international relations thinking", below).

His most widely acknowledged successes as foreign minister were his initiation of the UN peace plan for Cambodia, and the roles that he and Australia played in bringing to fruition the International Chemical Weapons Convention and establishing both the Asia Pacific Economic Cooperation (APEC) forum and the ASEAN Regional Forum (ARF). Major contributions to international agenda setting, though not bearing much immediate fruit, were his book on UN reform launched in New York City in 1993, and his initiation with Paul Keating of the Canberra Commission on the Elimination of Nuclear Weapons.

In 1990, Evans famously became the first person to drop the f-bomb in the Australian Parliament, interjecting "for fuck's sake" during a speech by Senator Robert Hill. Despite his reputation as a negotiator, he was widely reputed to be in possession of a short temper, with a particular intolerance for elected representatives of the Australian Greens.

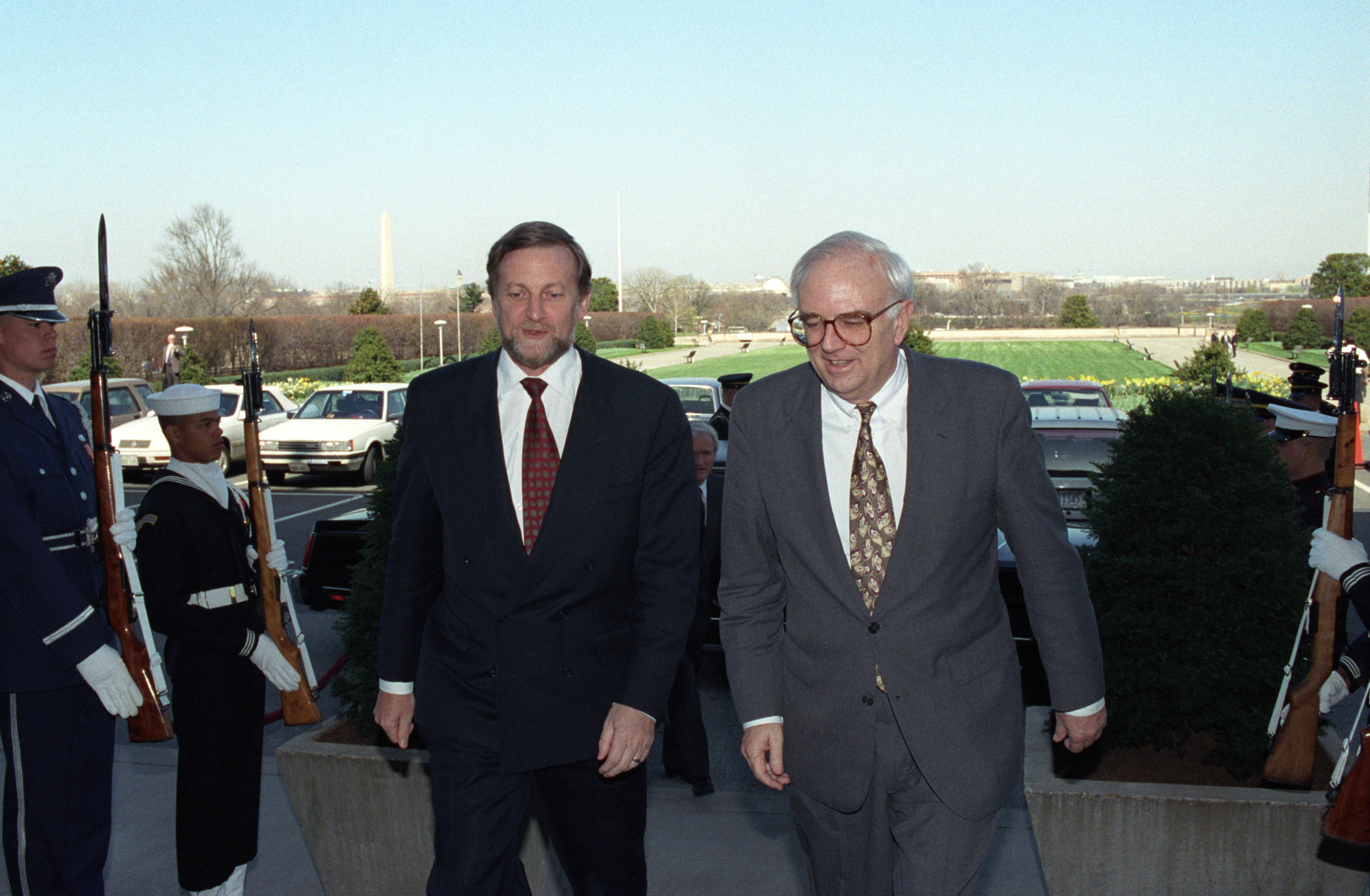
Evans (left) with United States Secretary of Defense Les Aspin (right) in 1993.

Evans ran into significant controversy on two major issues: relations with Indonesia over East Timor and French Nuclear Tests in the Pacific. Evans continues to be strongly criticised by many commentators – most prominently Noam Chomsky and John Pilger – for supporting Australia's recognition of Indonesian sovereignty over East Timor following its military invasion in 1975, negotiating (and celebrating "replete with champagne") with then Indonesian Foreign Minister Ali Alatas the Timor Gap Treaty, and describing the 1991 Dili massacre as "an aberration, not an act of state policy". Evans has replied at length to these charges in various forums, acknowledging that the Indonesian military's behaviour had been appalling and conceding that Australia had been too optimistic about its capacity for redemption, but arguing that de jure recognition by Australian (and other) governments had never denied the continuing right of the East Timorese to self-determination; that he personally had worked hard (as subsequently acknowledged by José Ramos-Horta) to achieve real autonomy for East Timor as the only realistic option before the events of 1997; and that independent East Timor had fully inherited the benefits of the Timor Gap Treaty. The Timor Gap Treaty was replaced by the Timor Sea Treaty after East Timor's independence in 2002. However, after the Australia-East Timor spying scandal came to light, East Timor terminated the treaties, which were favourable to Australia. In 2018, the treaty in force today was concluded, which is far more favourable to East Timor.

When in June 1995 the resumption of French underground nuclear tests at Moruroa Atoll was announced, Evans generated a storm of press and public criticism for remarking that, while Australia deplored the decision, "it could have been worse". This was strictly accurate as the test series was limited in number, and France promised to then permanently close the test facility and join the Comprehensive Nuclear Test Ban Treaty negotiations, but it politically damaged Evans and his party.

=== Leader of the government in the Senate, 1993–1996 ===
In 1993, as a member of the Keating government, Senator Evans became Leader of the Government in the Senate, replacing the retiring John Button, whose deputy he had been since 1987. In this position he led the government's domestic legislative agenda in the upper house, where the government did not have a majority, and every bill had to be negotiated with the minor parties. In what was described at the time as "perhaps the finest moment in his political career", he played the leading role in getting the government's Native Title Act 1993 through the Senate in one of the Parliament's longest-ever debates following the High Court of Australia's decision in Mabo v Queensland.

=== Return to opposition, 1996–1999 ===
Evans had long desired to move from the Senate to the House of Representatives, where he hoped to pursue leadership ambitions. His first attempt to do so, in 1984, had been thwarted by the Socialist Left faction, but in 1995 he gained endorsement for the seat of Holt, in Melbourne's eastern suburbs, and was elected at the 1996 election. He was elected Deputy Leader of the Labor Party, defeating Simon Crean, and appointed Shadow Treasurer by Leader Kim Beazley. As Deputy Leader, Evans led a major policy review in every shadow portfolio area, and during 1997 orchestrated in secret the defection to the Labor Party of the popular leader of the Australian Democrats, Senator Cheryl Kernot, who resigned from the Senate in October and became a Labor House of Representatives candidate at the 1998 election. The political triumph of the defection was, however, soured by the later revelation – by Laurie Oakes in his column in The Bulletin in 2002 – that Evans and Kernot had been having an affair at the time.

Evans, after eighteen years in the Senate, found the transition to the much rowdier and fast-paced lower-house environment not easy to manage, and – with Australia sailing comfortably through the 1997 Asian financial crisis – also found it difficult to get traction with his own economic policy brief. He also did not enjoy the move to opposition after thirteen years in government, coining the expression "relevance deprivation syndrome", which – while he was criticised more than applauded for his honesty at the time – is now entrenched in the national vocabulary. His biographer, Keith Scott, commented that "Overwhelmingly, Evans's period as deputy leader and shadow treasurer – from March 1996 to October 1998 – was his least successful in federal parliament". Labor's defeat at the 1998 election led to Evans's resignation from the opposition front bench, and in September 1999 he resigned from Parliament, causing a by-election which was won by Labor candidate Anthony Byrne.

Throughout his time as a member of both houses of Parliament, Evans served in three of the four leadership positions: deputy Senate leader, Senate leader and deputy leader in the House of Representatives.

Ironically, the only leadership position he did not attain was that of party leader (in the House of Representatives) which had been the very reason for his switch from the Senate to the House of Representatives.

== International activity after politics ==
=== International Crisis Group ===
In 1994, while Foreign Minister of Australia, Evans committed his government to donate $500,000 as initial funding for Brussels-based conflict prevention and resolution organisation, the International Crisis Group (ICG).

From 2000 to 2009 Evans was president and CEO of the ICG, which during his tenure grew in staff from 25 to over 130, in budget from $US2 million to over $15 million, and in operating area from a handful of countries in the Balkans and Central Africa to over 60 across four continents, and published 784 worldwide-distributed reports.

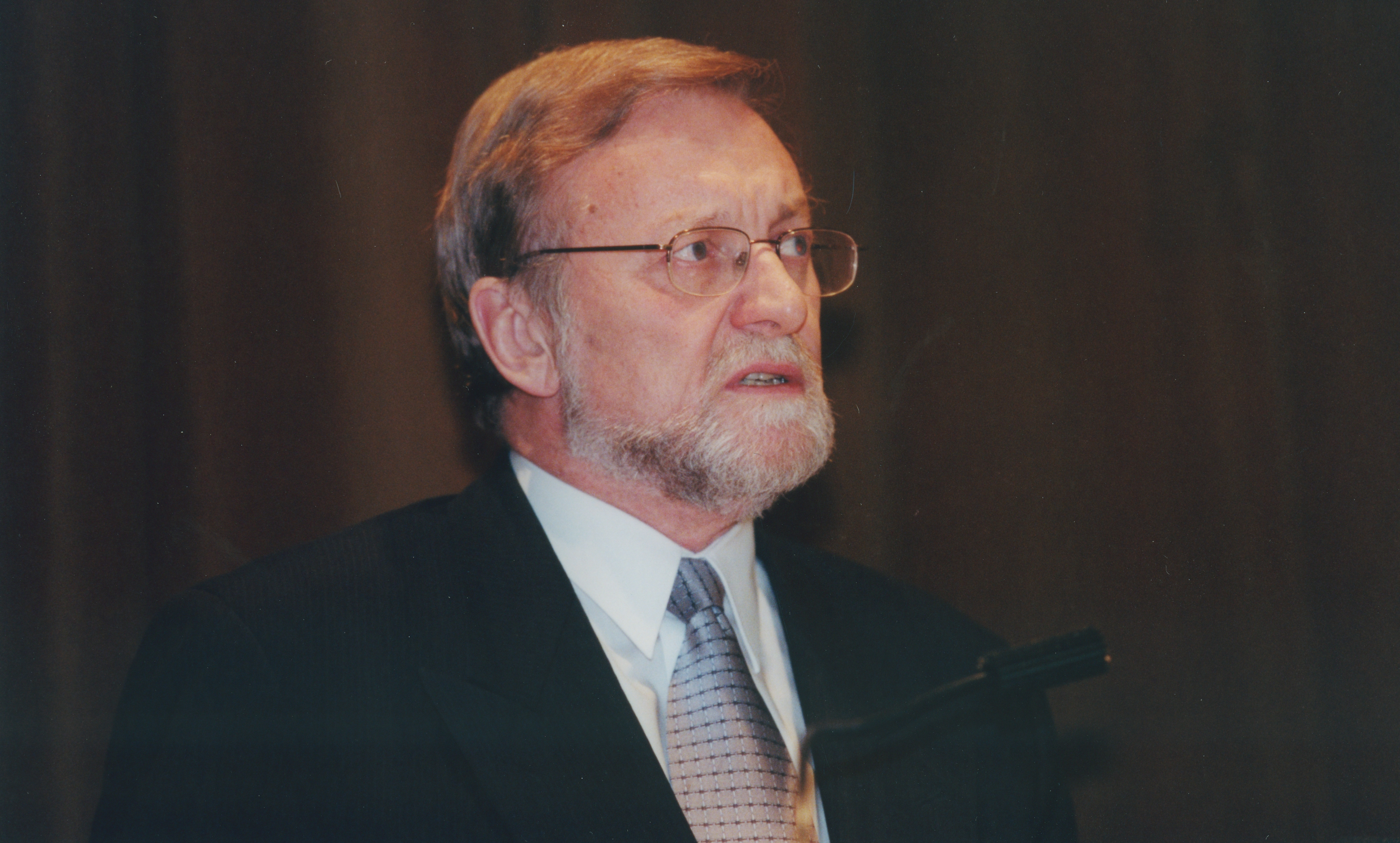
Evans at the London School of Economics as the guest lecturer on human rights in 2000.

The ICG made important contributions during this period in early-warning bellringing in cases like Darfur and Ethiopia-Eritrea, supporting conflict mediation in situations like Southern Sudan, Kosovo and Aceh, making path-breaking recommendations on Israel-Palestine, Iran and Burma/Myanmar, analysing the different strands of Islamism, and generally providing timely and detailed field-based analysis and recommendations to policymakers on hundreds of separate conflict-related issues.

Although subject to occasional attack for the taken positions, the ICG was established by the time of Evans's departure, and has remained, the international NGO working on the prevention and resolution of conflict, praised by leaders like Condoleezza Rice to Hillary Clinton, and regularly being identified as one of the world's most influential think tanks.

=== The responsibility to protect ===
In 2000–2001 Evans co-chaired, with Mohamed Sahnoun, the International Commission on Intervention and State Sovereignty (ICISS), appointed by the government of Canada to address the issue of genocide and other mass atrocity crimes, which published its report, The Responsibility to Protect, in December 2001.

The co-chairs then wrote an article on this matter. A state's sovereignty, they argued, is also under question in times of mass murder, in terms of legitimacy. Sovereignty is dependent upon the state's responsibility to its people; if not fulfilled, then the contract between the government and its citizen is void, thus the sovereignty is not legitimate. In that crucible lies the genesis of the responsibility to protect (R2P) doctrine.

The core idea of the R2P doctrine, as endorsed by the United Nations General Assembly at the 2005 World Summit, is that every state has the responsibility to protect its population from genocide and other mass atrocity crimes; the international community has a responsibility to assist the state if it is unable to protect its population on its own; and that, if the state fails to protect its citizens from mass atrocities and peaceful measures have failed, the international community has the responsibility to intervene with appropriate measures, with coercive military intervention, approved by the UN Security Council, available as a last resort. The concept was expressly designed to supersede the idea of "humanitarian intervention", which had failed to generate any international consensus about how to respond to the 1990s catastrophes of Rwanda, Bosnia and Kosovo.

Evans has been widely acknowledged as playing a crucial role in initiating the concept and advocating its international acceptance, first as co-chair of the International Commission on Intervention and State Sovereignty which introduced the expression in its 2001 report of that name, and subsequently as a member of the UN Secretary-General's High Level Panel on Threats, Challenges and Change, Co-Chair of the Advisory Board of the Global Centre on the Responsibility to Protect, a member of the Editorial Board of the journal Global Responsibility to Protect and as the author of the Brookings Institution-published The Responsibility to Protect: Ending Mass Atrocity Crimes Once and For All and many other published works. He has made innumerable speeches and presentations on the issue, including in July 2009 participating at the UNGA in an interactive dialogue with Noam Chomsky.

=== Other international panels and commissions ===
He was a member of the UN Secretary General's High Level Panel on Threats, Challenges and Change, whose report A More Secure World: Our Shared Responsibility, addressing mass atrocity crimes and many other UN reform issues, was published in December 2004.

Evans also served on the UN Secretary-General's Advisory Committee on Genocide Prevention.

Evans had previously served as a member of the Carnegie Commission on Preventing Deadly Conflict (1994–97), co-chaired by Cyrus Vance and David Hamburg. He was also a member of the International Task Force on Global Public Goods, sponsored by Sweden and France and chaired by Ernesto Zedillo, which reported in September 2006.

He is a member of the Crimes Against Humanity Initiative Advisory Council, a project of the Whitney R. Harris World Law Institute at Washington University School of Law in St. Louis to establish the world's first treaty on the prevention and punishment of crimes against humanity.

Evans drew on this personal experience in his chapter on "Commission Diplomacy" in The Oxford Handbook of Modern Diplomacy.

=== Nuclear issues ===
On nuclear issues, he was a member of the Commission on Weapons of Mass Destruction sponsored by Sweden and chaired by Hans Blix which reported in June 2006; and the Commission of Eminent Persons on The Role of the IAEA to 2020 and Beyond, chaired by Ernesto Zedillo, whose report Reinforcing the Global Nuclear Order for Peace and Prosperity was launched in June 2008. From 2008 to 2010 he co-chaired (with former Japanese Foreign Minister Yoriko Kawaguchi) the Australia and Japan sponsored International Commission on Nuclear Non-proliferation and Disarmament: its report Eliminating Nuclear Threats: A Practical Agenda for Global Policymakers was published in December 2009.

Evans was the founding Convenor of the Asia-Pacific Leadership Network on Nuclear Non-Proliferation and Disarmament in 2011, and Chair of the International Advisory Board of the ANU Centre for Nuclear Non-Proliferation and Disarmament 2011-15.

=== Other organisations ===
His other recorded affiliatins with internationally focused organisations include:

- Asia Pacific Leadership Network on Nuclear Non-Proliferation and Disarmament (APLN), Founding Convenor and Board Member
- Asia Society, Member of the Global Council
- Australian Institute of International Affairs, Fellow
- ANU Centre for Asian-Australian Leadership, Co-Chair
- Bulletin of the Atomic Scientists, Member of Board of Sponsors
- Global Leadership Foundation, Member
- Independent Diplomat, Member of the Advisory Council
- Institute for Economics and Peace, Member of the International Advisory Board
- Institute for Integrated Transitions, Member of the International Advisory Council
- International Luxembourg Forum on Preventing Nuclear Catastrophe, Member of the Supervisory Council

=== Academic career and published writing ===
Before entering Australian politics Evans was a lecturer, then senior lecturer, in law at the University of Melbourne, teaching constitutional and civil liberties law, crime and torts, from 1971 to 1976. In 2009, after his retirement from politics and his subsequent career as head of the International Crisis Group, he returned to academic life as an honorary professorial fellow (later professorial fellow) in the School of Social and Political Sciences at the University of Melbourne, teaching a graduate course on international policymaking in practice in 2011 and 2012.

He was elected as chancellor of the Australian National University (ANU) from 1 January 2010, replacing Kim Beazley following Beazley's appointment as Australian Ambassador to the United States. Evans was installed by Governor-General Quentin Bryce at a ceremony in Canberra on 18 February 2010, and served until 1 January 2020.

He is also elected an Honorary Fellow of Magdalen College, Oxford in 2024; and since 2020 has been Distinguished Honorary Professor at ANU; he is also a Distinguished Fellow of the Australia India Institute at the University of Melbourne. Evans has maintained strong academic and scholarly connections throughout his career, lecturing at many universities around the world, including Oxford, Cambridge (where he delivered the 2013 Humanitas Lectures on Statecraft and Diplomacy), Princeton, Yale, Stanford, Indiana and the Central European University in Budapest.

Evans has written or edited 14 books, most recently Good International Citizenship: The Case for Decency (Monash Publishing, 2022). His other major works include Incorrigible Optimist: A Political Memoir (Melbourne University Press, 2017), Inside the Hawke Keating Government: A Cabinet Diary (Melbourne University Press, 2014), The Responsibility to Protect: Ending Mass Atrocity Crimes Once and for All (Brookings Institution Press, September 2008, paperback edition 2009), which was awarded an Honorable Mention in the US Council on Foreign Relations Arthur Ross Book Award 2009 as one of the best three books on international relations published in the previous year, as well as Australia's Foreign Relations (with Bruce Grant, Melbourne University Press 1991, 2nd ed 1995), Cooperating for Peace: The Global Agenda for the 1990s (Allen & Unwin, 1993), Australia's Constitution (with John McMillan and Haddon Storey, Allen & Unwin, 1983) and the edited collection Labor and the Constitution, 1972–1975 (Heinemann, 1977). He co-edited the annual Labor Essays series from 1980 to 1982.

Evans has also published nearly 150 chapters in books, monographs and articles in refereed and other journals – and many more newspaper and magazine articles – on foreign relations, politics, human rights and legal reform.

== Contributions to international relations thinking ==
=== Good international citizenship ===
Evans introduced the idea of "good international citizenship" in his first major speeches as Australian foreign minister, and repeated and refined it in subsequent writing, most recently his monograph Good International Citizenship: The Case for Decency (Monash Publishing, 2022). The core notion was that "being, and being seen to be, a good international citizen" should be seen not as the "foreign policy equivalent of boy-scout good deeds", but as a distinct component of any country's national interest, "quite distinct from the familiar duo of security and economic interests":

The interest in question here is more than just the pleasure of basking in approbation. There are many direct reciprocal benefits to be gained in a world where no country can solve all its own problems: my assistance for you today in solving your drugs and terrorism problem might reasonably lead you to be more willing to help solve my environmental problem tomorrow. But the reputational benefit does also count. The perception of being a country willing to take principled stands for other than immediately self-interested reasons does no harm at all – as the Scandinavians in particular seem to have well understood – when it comes to advancing one's own commercial or political agendas.

The concept of "good international citizenship" has been specifically attributed to Evans in academic writing; its "idealistic pragmatism" has been seen as a way of bridging or transcending rival doctrines of realism and idealism in international relations theory; and the idea has been advanced as mapping a possible "third way for British foreign policy".

=== Niche diplomacy ===
"Niche diplomacy" was identified by Evans as one of the characteristic methods of the larger and more familiar concept of middle power diplomacy which has traditionally characterised the approach to international relations of Canada (especially during the Pearson years) and Australia (especially under the Labor governments of Hawke, Keating and Rudd). He defined it as "concentrating resources in specific areas best able to generate returns worth having, rather than trying to cover the field. By definition, middle powers are not powerful enough in most circumstances to impose their will, but they may be persuasive enough to have likeminded others see their point of view, and to act accordingly". The concept is now familiar in academic discourse, and has been specifically attributed to Evans.

=== Cooperative security ===
Evans won the 1995 Grawemeyer Award for Ideas Improving World Order (following Mikhail Gorbachev the year before) for his fall 1994 Foreign Policy article, "Cooperative Security and Intra-State Conflict", which was cited as presenting ideas that, following the end of the Cold War "could quicken the process ... to help maintain a new world order". He described "cooperative security" as being a single conceptual theme that effectively captured the essence of three more familiar concepts in international security discourse, viz. comprehensive security, common security and collective security. Its defining – and attractive – characteristics were that "the term tends to connote consultation rather than confrontation, reassurance rather than deterrence, transparency rather than secrecy, prevention rather than correction, and interdependence rather than unilateralism".

== Honours and awards ==
On 11 June 2012, Evans was named a Companion of the Order of Australia for "eminent service to international relations, particularly in the Asia Pacific Region as an adviser to governments on a range of global policy matters, to conflict prevention and resolution, and to arms control and disarmament". He had previously been made an Officer of the Order of Australia (AO) in 2001 for "service to the Australian Parliament, particularly through advancing Australia's foreign policy and trade interests, especially in Asia and through the United Nations", and has been awarded honorary doctorates of laws by the University of Melbourne in 2002, Carleton University in 2005, the University of Sydney in 2008 and Queen's University Ontario in 2010. In October 2005, he and the International Crisis Group were named European and Asian "Heroes of 2005". In July 2008, he was selected as an inaugural fellow of the Australian Institute of International Affairs in recognition of his "outstanding contribution to Australian international relations". In May 2010 he was awarded the 2010 Roosevelt Institute Four Freedoms Award for Freedom from Fear for his pioneering work on the responsibility to protect concept and his contributions to conflict prevention and resolution, arms control and disarmament. In October 2011, he was presented by the Nuclear Threat Initiative, led by Sam Nunn and Ted Turner, the Amartya Sen Award "for intrepid and creative leadership in creating momentum toward a world free of nuclear weapons". In December 2011 Foreign Policy magazine cited him, along with Francis Deng, as one of the Top 100 Global Thinkers for 2011 "for making 'the responsibility to protect' more than academic". In 2012 Evans was elected an honorary fellow of the Academy of the Social Sciences in Australia.

In 2016 he was awarded the Sir Edward 'Weary' Dunlop Asialink Medal "for long-term commitment to enhancing the quality of life in the region and improving Australia-Asia relations". In March 2017 he received the Canadian Simons Foundation Award for Distinguished Global Leadership in the Service of Peace and Disarmament. In May 2023 he was given the ROK Jeju 4.3 Peace Award for his significant contribution over three decades to promoting peace, reconciliation and human rights as foreign minister, NGO head, international commission member, writer and advocate.

Earlier in his career he was designated Australian Humanist of the Year in 1990 by the Council of Australian Humanist Societies, won the ANZAC Peace Prize in 1994 for his "leadership role in the Cambodian Peace Process", was awarded in 1995 the prestigious University of Louisville $150,000 Grawemeyer Prize for Ideas Improving World Order for his 1994 Foreign Policy article "Cooperative Security and Intrastate Conflict", and in 1999 received the Chilean Order of Merit (Grand Officer) for his work in initiating APEC.

== Personal life ==
Evans has been married since 1969 to Professor Merran Evans, of Monash University, with whom he has two adult children. They have four grandchildren.

In 2002, Evans admitted to having an extramarital relationship with Cheryl Kernot.

He has been a lifelong supporter, and was during his time in Australian government a special patron, of the Hawthorn Football Club. His other stated leisure interests are reading and writing, travel, architecture, opera and golf.

== Books ==
- Good International Citizenship: The Case for Decency (Monash Publishing Press, 2022)
- Incorrigible Optimist: A Political Memoir (Melbourne University Press, 2017)
- Nuclear Weapons: The State of Play 2015 (with Ramesh Thakur and Tanya Ogilvie-White co-authors), Canberra, Centre for Nuclear Non-Proliferation and Disarmament, 2015
- Inside the Hawke-Keating Government: A Cabinet Diary (Melbourne, Melbourne University Press, 2014)
- Nuclear Weapons: The State of Play (with Ramesh Thakur co-ed), Canberra, Centre for Nuclear Non-Proliferation and Disarmament, 2013
- The Responsibility to Protect: Ending Mass Atrocity Crimes Once and for All (Washington DC: Brookings Institution Press, 2008)
- Australia's Foreign Relations (with Bruce Grant), Melbourne University Press, Melbourne, 2nd ed. 1995
- Cooperating for Peace: The Global Agenda for the 1990s and Beyond, Sydney, Allen and Unwin, 1993
- Australia's Constitution (with John McMillan and Haddon Storey), Law Foundation of NSW & Allen and Unwin, Sydney, 1983
- Labor Essays 1982: Socialist Principles and Parliamentary Government (with John Reeves co-ed.), Melbourne, Drummond, 1982
- Labor Essays 1981 (with John Reeves and Justin Malbon co-eds), Melbourne, Drummond, 1981
- Labor Essays 1980 (with John Reeves co-ed.), Melbourne, Drummond, 1980
- Law, Politics and the Labor Movement (ed.), LSB, Melbourne, 1980
- Labor and the Constitution, 1972–1975 (ed.), Melbourne, Heinemann, 1977

Political offices
Preceded by Peter Durack	Attorney General of Australia; 1983–1984	Succeeded by Lionel Bowen
Preceded by Peter Walsh	Minister for Resources and Energy; 1984–1987	Succeeded by John Kerin
Preceded by Peter Morris	Minister for Transport and Communications; 1987–1988	Succeeded by Ralph Willis
Preceded by Bill Hayden	Minister for Foreign Affairs; 1988–1996	Succeeded by Alexander Downer
Preceded by John Button	Leader of the Government in the Senate; 1993–1996	Succeeded by Robert Hill
Parliament of Australia
Preceded by Michael Duffy	Member of Parliament for Holt; 1996–1999	Succeeded by Anthony Byrne
Party political offices
Preceded by John Button	Leader of the Labor Party in the Senate; 1993–1996	Succeeded by John Faulkner
Preceded by Kim Beazley	Deputy Leader of the Labor Party; 1996–1998	Succeeded by Simon Crean
Business positions
Preceded by Alain Destexhe	President of the International Crisis Group; 2000–2009	Succeeded by Louise Arbour
Academic offices
Preceded by Kim Beazley	Chancellor of Australian National University; 2010–2020	Succeeded by Julie Bishop
