= Sivanka Dhanapala =

Sri Lankan international lawyer and UN humanitarian official

- Born: 1968
- Education: University of Colombo; University of Buckingham (LL.B.); American University (LL.M.)
- Occupations: International lawyer; Humanitarian official
- Employer: United Nations High Commissioner for Refugees
- Title: Director of the UNHCR New York Office
- Parents: Jayantha Dhanapala (father); Maureen Dhanapala (mother)

Sivanka Dhanapala (born 1968) is a Sri Lankan international lawyer and humanitarian official. Serving with the United Nations High Commissioner for Refugees (UNHCR) since 1992, he is the director of the UNHCR New York Office. Over a three-decade career with the United Nations, he has held senior field and diplomatic posts across Asia and the Middle East, including serving as the UNHCR Representative to Iran, China, and Syria.

== Early life and education ==
Dhanapala was born in 1968 into a diplomatic family, leading to an upbringing across several countries. He completed his secondary education at the International School of Geneva in Switzerland.

Following high school, he returned to Sri Lanka to study at the Faculty of Law at the University of Colombo. Due to political instability and university closures in Sri Lanka at the time, he transferred to the United Kingdom, earning his Bachelor of Laws (LL.B.) from the University of Buckingham. He later moved to the United States to pursue postgraduate studies, obtaining a Master of Laws (LL.M.) with a specialization in international humanitarian law from the American University Washington College of Law in Washington, D.C.

== Career ==
Dhanapala began his career as a lawyer in Sri Lanka before joining the UNHCR in 1992. Between 1993 and 1994, he worked at the headquarters of the International Atomic Energy Agency (IAEA) in Vienna, Austria. From 1999 to 2001, he served in New York as the representative for Francis Deng, the Representative of the UN secretary-general on Internally Displaced Persons.

Throughout his early and mid-career at UNHCR, Dhanapala alternated between policy roles in New York and Geneva and emergency field operations. His field assignments included missions in Cambodia, Bosnia and Herzegovina, North Macedonia (during the Kosovo crisis), Myanmar, Afghanistan, and Pakistan.

=== Country Representative roles ===
- Iran (2014–2018): In May 2014, Dhanapala was appointed as the UNHCR Representative in Iran. During his tenure in Tehran, he oversaw humanitarian assistance and protection programs for nearly one million registered refugees, predominantly from Afghanistan. He notably worked alongside Iranian authorities on initiatives expanding refugee access to national healthcare and education systems.
- China (2018–2022): Dhanapala subsequently served as the UNHCR Representative in the People's Republic of China, managing refugee protection, advocacy, and regional cooperation across mainland China, Hong Kong, and Macau.
- Syria (2022–2024): Appointed as the UNHCR Representative in Syria, Dhanapala led one of the agency's largest complex humanitarian operations. In February 2023, he coordinated UNHCR's emergency shelter and relief response in Syria following the 2023 Turkey–Syria earthquakes, advocating for international aid for communities facing compounded displacement.

=== Director of the UNHCR New York Office ===
In early 2024, Dhanapala was appointed director of the UNHCR New York Office. In this capacity, he serves as the agency's primary liaison to United Nations Headquarters, representing UNHCR in briefings to the United Nations Security Council, the Economic and Social Council (ECOSOC), and permanent diplomatic missions regarding global forced displacement, asylum protection, and humanitarian-development coordination.
