= Mohamed Sahnoun =

Algerian diplomat (born 1931)

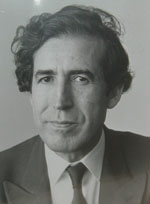

Permanent Representative of Algeria to the United Nations
- In office 1982–1984

Ambassador of Algeria to the United States
- In office 1984–1989
- Preceded by: Layachi Yaker
- Succeeded by: Abderrahane Bensid

United Nations Special Representative for Somalia
- In office April 1992 – November 1992
- Succeeded by: Ismat Kittani

Special Representative of the Secretary-General of the OAU in the Congo
- Incumbent
- Assumed office 1993

UN/OAU Special Representative for Great Lakes Region of Africa
- Incumbent
- Assumed office 1997

Personal details
- Born: 8 April 1931 Chlef, French Algeria
- Died: 20 September 2018 (aged 87) Paris, France
- Education: New York University
- Occupation: Diplomat

Mohamed Sahnoun (Arabic: محمد سحنون; 8 April 1931 – 20 September 2018) was an Algerian diplomat who served as ambassador of Algeria to West Germany, France, the United States, and Morocco as well as permanent representative of Algeria to the United Nations. He also served as the Organisation of African Unity's Assistant Secretary General, the Arab League's Assistant Secretary-general, the Secretary-General of the United Nations's Special Representative for Somalia in 1992 and the Secretary-General of the United Nations's Special Representative for the Great Lakes region of Africa in 1997 before continuing to work for peace and reconciliation through various UN-related or independent charities. He particularly focused on developing intercultural and inter-religious dialogues and on healing wounded memories from past conflicts.

== Early years and Algerian War ==
Mohamed Sahnoun was born in 1931 in Chlef (known as Castellum Tingitanum during Roman times, Al Asnam during the Umayyad Caliphate period and from 1962 to 1980 as well as Orléansville during the French colonization), in Algeria. He first studied at the Lycée of Algiers and then went on at the Sorbonne in Paris. He was there on the day of the first hostilities of the Algerian War (1 November 1954). As an activist of the FLN, he responded to the call to strike launched by the Union générale des étudiants musulmans algériens (Ugema) on 19 May 1956, stopped studying in Paris and came back home in Algeria.

There, he started to work in the 'Social Centers' created by former French Resistance fighter Germaine Tillon with the agreement of Jacques Soustelle (then Governor General of Algeria) in order to alleviate misery, squalor and illiteracy in Algerian populations. In March 1957, the organisation was raided and searched by police, who arrested and detained twelve Christians (among which priests) and twenty-three Muslims. Being one of the managers of the 'Social Centers', Mohamed Sahnoun was part of this group, which was charged with conspiracy and tried in a fairly loudly-trumpeted trial, nicknamed the "Progressive Christians" trial. Mohamed Sahnoun was subsequently detained in the infamous "Villa Sésini", the torture and detention centre of the 1st Foreign Parachute Regiment during the Battle of Algiers. He himself was subjected to torture. Released for lack of conclusive evidence, Mohamed Sahnoun then sought refuge in metropolitan France, in Clichy then in Switzerland in Lausanne. He was unable to go back to Algeria before independence.

During his early years Mohamed Sahnoun also got acquainted with the pacifist NGO Service Civil International in Algeria in 1952–53; he participated in several of their international workcamps and even became the head of their Algerian branch for some time. This provided him with an enduring philosophical background (see infra) and also with an important network of trusted friends who would be of great assistance to him through the events of the 1950s. Mohamed Sahnoun then resumed his studies at New York University where he obtained a Bachelor of Arts degree and a Master of Arts degrees, both in political science.

== Diplomatic career ==
=== At the service of Algeria ===
Mohamed Sahnoun first became diplomatic advisor of the Provisional Government of the Algerian Republic. In 1962 he travelled with president Ben Bella on his first official visit to the USA, where he met with president John Kennedy who had been one of the supporters of the cause of Algerian independence. As the Algerian delegation was then due to travel to Cuba, Kennedy showed Ben Bella the first secret pictures taken by U2 planes showing Russian missiles launch pads in Cuba. In the name of peace and human security, Ben Bella agreed to convey a message to Fidel Castro making clear how much the American regarded this situation as a casus belli. Mohamed Sahnoun then held the following positions:

- Deputy Secretary-General of the Organization of African Unity (OAU) (1964–1973)
- Deputy Secretary-General of the League of Arab States in charge of Arab-Africa dialogue (1973–1975).
- Algerian Ambassador to Federal Republic of Germany (1975–1979)
- Algerian Ambassador to France (1979–1982). Under his leadership, an agreement was reached between France and Algeria regarding social security and retirement settlement for Algerian workers in France.
- Head of the Algerian diplomatic mission to the United States (1982–1984)
- Algerian Ambassadeur d'Algérie to the United States (1984–1989). During his tenure, he organised a state visit by president Chadli Bendjedid to Ronald Reagan, the first official visit ever of an Algerian head of state to the United States.
- In 1989, Sahnoun is called to take over urgently as Algeria's Ambassador to Morocco, in order to succeed ambassadeur Abdelhamid Mehri, who is himself urgently requested to take the presidency of FLN after the 1988 October riots in Algeria; he becomes simultaneously Algerian Ambassador to Morocco and secretary of the Arab Maghreb Union (1989–1990).
- His name was mentioned as a possible recourse candidate for the Algerian presidential election of April 1999 but it is finally Abdelaziz Bouteflika, a former foreign minister who had retired from public office since 1981, who stood as a " free candidate " for and from FLN.

=== At the service of the United Nations ===
- Senior Adviser to the Secretary-General of the United Nations Conference on Environment and Development (UNCED).
- Special Representative of the Secretary-General of the United Nations to Somalia (April to November 1992). In this position, the efficiency of his diplomatic style is unanimously recognised and promising results are achieved; however his peacebuilding action was interrupted by the lack of efficient backing from the UN and by the US military impatience to intervene. Mohamed Sahnoun resigned in protest. The intervention led by the US-backed Unified Task Force (code-named Operation Restore Hope) actually ended in utter disaster.
- Special Representative of the Secretary-General of the OAU in the Congo (1993).
- Special Adviser to the Director-General of the United Nations Educational, Scientific and Cultural Organization (UNESCO) for the Culture of Peace Programme (1995–1997).
- United Nations/Organization of African Unity (OAU) Special Representative for the Great Lakes region of Africa (1997).

== Studies and reports ==
- Mohamed Sahnoun was a member of the Brundtland Commission on environment and development and co-author of the Brundtland report, which coined the expression sustainable development and its definition.
- Co-chair with Gareth Evans of the International Commission on Intervention and State Sovereignty (ICISS), whose report, entitled The Responsibility to Protect was published in December 2001 with the support of the Canadian government. (Following the Rwanda genocide, the Canadian government established the International Commission on Intervention and State Sovereignty (ICISS) in September 2000 under the joint presidency of Gareth Evans and Mohamed Sahnoun. In February 2001, the ICISS suggested the phrase "responsibility to protect" as a way to avoid the "right to intervene" or "obligation to intervene" doctrines and yet keep a degree of duty to act to resolve humanitarian crises.)
- Pearson fellow with the International Development Research Centre in Ottawa, Canada (1994).
- Member of the Special Advisory Group of the War-torn Societies Project, a joint endeavour of the United Nations Research Institute for Social Development (UNRISD) and of and the Graduate Institute of International Studies in Geneva.

== Personal commitments with NGOs ==
- Board member of International Institute for Sustainable Development (IISD) from 1990 to 1996, and from 2003 to 2009.
- President of Initiatives of Change International, Swiss-based iNGO which promotes effecting social change beginning with personal change, and works particularly on reestablishing dialogue and trust between opposing parties as a contribution towards peacebuilding, good governance and sustainable economic development (2007–2008).
- President of the Caux Forum for Human Security (2008–2012), a project which annually brought together 300 people active in human security, aiming to build a worldwide coalition of conscience that recognises the importance of building trust among actors at all levels to achieve meaningful change.
- Vice-president of the board of University for Peace (UPEACE), UN-mandated organisation, established in December 1980 as a Treaty Organisation by the UN General Assembly; senior advisor for the Africa and Middle-East UPEACE programmes and chair of the UPEACE consultative Council for Africa.
- Co-chair of the International Advisory Board for the Global Centre for the Responsibility to Protect.
- Member of the Earth Charter Commission and served as a member of the Earth Charter International Council.

== Books ==
- In 1994, Mohamed Sahnoun published "Somalia: The Missed Opportunities", a book in which he analyses the reasons for the failure of the 1992 UN intervention in Somalia; he shows in particular that, between the start of the Somali civil war in 1988 and the fall of the Siad Barre regime in January 1991, the United Nations missed at least three opportunities to prevent major human tragedies. When the United Nations tried to provide humanitarian assistance, they were totally outperformed by NGOs, whose competence and dedication sharply contrasted with the United Nations' excessive caution and bureaucratic inefficiencies. If radical reform was not undertaken, warned Mohamed Sahnoun, then the United Nations would continue to respond to such crisis in a climate of inept improvisation.
- In 2007, Mohamed Sahnoun also published (in French) a largely autobiographic novel set in Algeria in 1954, Mémoire blessée (Hurt Memory'’); its main character, Salem, a man of faith and dialogue'’, is jailed and tortured because of his convictions. He is however rescued by French people, some civilian, some military and some ecclesiactic – who all take great risks to shield him. The book is clearly an evocation of the events which marked the author's younger years (see above the early years and Algeria wars section), but it also calls for human solidarity and the protection of the weaker.

== Philosophy ==
Mohamed Sahnoun met pacifism in 1952 in Alger through the Service Civil International NGO. He had read the book by Pierre Ceresole, the Swiss founder of this organisation, and even more importantly the book by Romain Rolland on Gandhi, "which was practically my bedside book at the time." These ideas stayed with him through his long professional career, where he was from the onset a man of dialogue, trying for instance to establish appropriate communication between communities about Congo through the UNESCO-backed World Assembly of Youth (WAY), or as a leading figure of the OAU, particularly when African countries were confronted with the problems stemming from the borders inherited from colonialism, or in his different missions for the UN. His participation for several years in the very international and religiously mixed Service Civil International NGO also played a role in his understanding the sources of conflict and brought him to invest in how to heal the memory injuries resulting from past conflicts. He reinforces further this reflection in his later career years as he more and more commits in favour of human security, for instance though The Responsibility to Protect project (2001) or through his organizing from 2008 to 2012 of the Caux Forum for Human Security, with the following five themes: Healing Memory, Just Governance, Living Sustainably, Inclusive Economics and Intercultural Dialogue Very committed to interreligious diversity and dialogue, Mohamed Sahnoun rose strongly against the idea of Clash of Civilizations, saying for example: "I said to Huntington during a discussion in Washington, there is no such clash. Take the Somalian example: from a religious point of view, Somalis are more or less all on the same wavelength. But because of total insecurity, they split into clans and sub-clans. That's why I want to develop intercultural and inter-religious dialogue. "

== Distinctions ==
- A secondary school bears his name in the city of Oued Sly in Chlef, Algeria, his birthplace.
- 2007 "Elizabeth Haub Prize for Environmental Diplomacy" (link is external)'. The award, which recognizes significant achievements in the field of environmental law and diplomacy, was conferred on 14 May at a ceremony in New York.

== Sources ==
- Phillip C. Naylor, Historical Dictionary of Algeria, Scarecrow Press, Oxford, 2006; p. 400
- United Nations press releases
- Interview of Mohamed Sahnoun by Katherine Marshall in the Huffington Post on 10 May 2011

== See also ==
- List of peace activists
