= Nureldin Satti =

Sudanese diplomat

Doctor Nureldin Satti
- نور-الدين ساتي

Sudanese Ambassador to the United States

Personal details
- Education: University of Paris-Sorbonne

Nureldin Mohamed Hamed Satti is a former Sudanese ambassador to the United States who served from 2020 to 2022.

== Education ==
In 1974, Satti received his doctorate in literature from the University of Paris-Sorbonne.

== Life and career ==
Following his graduation, Satti returned to Sudan to teach the French language and literature at the University of Khartoum. In the following year, he joined the Ministry of Foreign Affairs of Sudan. From 1992 to 1996, he served as ambassador to France, the Vatican, Portugal and Switzerland and as Permanent Delegate to UNESCO.

In 2002, Satti was appointed United Nations Deputy Special Representative for Burundi, where he worked to end the country's civil war.

On May 5, 2020, Satti was appointed to be the first ambassador to Washington from Khartoum in 23 years.

On January 31, 2022, Satti was forced to resign from his position as ambassador, due to the coup in Sudan. He has said that he will "continue to resist" military rule in Sudan.

== Bibliography ==
- Two Views on the Crisis in Sudan, 2010.

== See also ==
- List of ambassadors of Sudan to the United States
- Sudan–United States relations
