= List of ambassadors of Sudan to the United States =

Coordinates: 38°54′41.2″N 77°2′58.1″W

Ambassador of Sudan to the United States
- Incumbent; Mohamed Abdalla Idris since 2022
- Inaugural holder: Ibrahim Anis
- Formation: August 31, 1956

The Sudanese Ambassador in Washington, D.C. is the official representative of the Government in Khartoum to the Government of the United States.

== List of representatives ==
Diplomatic agreement/designated	Diplomatic accreditation	Ambassador	Observations	List of heads of state of Sudan	List of presidents of the United States	Term end
August 22, 1956	August 31, 1956	Ibrahim Anis		Ismail al-Azhari	Dwight D. Eisenhower	
July 7, 1959	July 21, 1959	Osman El Hadari		Ibrahim Abbud	Dwight D. Eisenhower	
April 16, 1965	May 5, 1965	Khalifa Abbas el Abeid	(* July 29, 1915): Religion: Muslim; Son of Abbas al-Obaid and Mrs., née Aicha.; In January 1946 married to Safiya, 5 children: Iqbal, Toufiq, Houda, Imane and Fateh.; Colleges and Institutes of Sudan.; Education: Gordon Memorial College; Bachelor Lit. from the University of Khartoum.; 1933-1953 Administration of the State Railways.; In 1955 he was Director of Khartoum Zone Under-Secretary of State for Special Affairs Member and Secretary General of the Sudanese Delegation to the Congress of Bandung.; Attached to the Ministry of Foreign Affairs.; From 1957 to 1959 he was Sudanese Ambassador to Ethiopia.; From 1959 to 1964 he was Sudanese Ambassador to Iraq, Turkey and Lebanon .; In 1965 he was Ambassador in Washington, D.C. .; Awards: Star of Ethiopia, Grand order of the Cedar (Lebanon) Jordanian Grand Order of Independence.	Ismail al-Azhari	Lyndon B. Johnson	
March 14, 1966	March 22, 1966	Amin Ahmad Hussein		Ismail al-Azhari	Lyndon B. Johnson	
June 6, 1967			SEVERED DIPLOMATIC RELATIONS – Interests Section in Somali Embassy	Ismail al-Azhari	Lyndon B. Johnson	
July 25, 1972			RESUMED DIPLOMATIC RELATIONS	Gaafar Nimeiry	Richard Nixon	
December 1, 1972	December 19, 1972	Abdel Aziz al-Nasri Hamza	(* 1931 in Sudan): Son of Dr. Nasri Hamza (Deputy Vice-Chancellor Ahfad College).; Married to Nur Elsham Mohammed Ali Belail, mother of his children : Elnasri, Ahmed, Sawsan, and Salma, then Maymoona M.Hamza, one child: Hind.; 1953 Diploma in Arts (with Merit, in English) Khartoum University .; 1953-56 Regional Inspector, Ministry of Labour.; 1956-1959 Second Secretary of Embassy, Bonn (West Germany).; 1959-1960 Member Sudan Mission to United Nations, New York.; 1960-1961 First Secretary of Embassy, Washington DC..; 1961-1962 Charge' d'Affaires, Sudan Embassy in Beirut.; 1962-1963 Counsellor of Embassy, Baghdad (Iraq).; 1963-1964 Charge' d'Affaires, Sudan Embassy (Kuwait).; 1956 Head of Political Section, Ministry of Foreign Affairs HQ, Khartoum.; 1968-1971 Ambassador of Sudan to Lebanon, Syria and Jordan with residence in Beirut.; Awards Order of First Class from West Germany and two C.M.G (Companions of the Order of St. Elizabeth II.	Gaafar Nimeiry	Richard Nixon	
August 8, 1974		Omer Yousif Birido	Chargé d'affaires, (* January 1, 1939 in Singa, Sudan): BA, MA.; married, one child.; 1958-1963 University of Khartoum, Sudan.; 1964-1966 University of Delhi, India.; 1964-1966 secretary, Sudanese Embassy, New Delhi.; 1966-1969 transferred to Sudanese Embassy, London.; 1969-1971 Ministry of Foreign Affairs, Khartoum.; 1971-1973 counsellor, Sudanese Embassy, Kampala.; In 1973 he was appointed counsellor, Permanent Mission of Sudan, New York.	Gaafar Nimeiry	Gerald Ford	
January 16, 1975	January 29, 1975	Francis Deng		Gaafar Nimeiry	Gerald Ford	
September 2, 1976	November 18, 1976	Omer Salih Mohamed Eisa		Gaafar Nimeiry	Gerald Ford	
September 12, 1985	November 5, 1985	Salah Ahmed Mohamed Salih		Omar al-Bashir	Ronald Reagan	
August 29, 1988	September 19, 1988	Hassan El Amin El Bashir	1978: as non-resident ambassador to the Republic of Indonesia.	Ahmad al-Mirghani	Ronald Reagan	
January 17, 1990	February 5, 1990	Abdalla Ahmed Abdalla	1922 former Minister of State for Foreign Affairs, Republic of Sudan Ministry of Foreign Affairs (Sudan)	Omar al-Bashir	George H. W. Bush	
August 23, 1993	October 1, 1993	Ahmed Suliman	(*January 14, 1924 in Omdurman): Sudanese official/ diplomat born 1924, Sudan); Education: Faculty of Law, University of Cairo, Egypt; Career: Minister of Agriculture, 1964.; Ambassador to USSR Minister of Economy and Foreign Trade, 1969–70.; Minister, Ahmed Suliman Ambassador Date Credentials Presented: 10/1/93.; An attorney by profession, In mid-1974 he instructed the Sudanese Ambassador in London, Ahmed Suleiman.; (May 1967)  Chairman, Sudan Peace Committee  : From May to Oct. 1969 he was Sudanese Ambassador to Russia Moscow.; From Oct. 1969 to July 1970 he was Minister of Economy and Foreign Trade.	Omar al-Bashir	Bill Clinton	
February 27, 1996	April 30, 1996	Mahdi Ibrahim Mohamed	Sudan's Minister of Information, Mahdi Ibrahim Mohamed	Omar al-Bashir	Bill Clinton	
July 8, 2011		Emad Mirghani Abdelhamid Altoham	Chargé d'affaires	Omar al-Bashir	Barack Obama	
May 5, 2020		Nureldin Satti		Abdalla Hamdok	Donald Trump	January 2, 2022
2022		Mohamed Abdalla Idris		Transitional Sovereignty Council	Joe Biden	

== See also ==
- Sudan–United States relations
- Embassy of Sudan, Washington, D.C.
