= List of permanent representatives of South Sudan to the United Nations =

Permanent Representative of South Sudan to the United Nations
- Emblem
- Incumbent; Alier Deng Ruai Deng since 23 June 2023
- Style: Excellency
- Residence: Avenue de France 23, 1202 Geneva
- Appointer: President of South Sudan
- Term length: At the pleasure of the president
- Inaugural holder: Francis Deng
- Formation: 19 September 2012; 13 years ago
- Website: www.southsudanmission.ch

The permanent representative of South Sudan to the United Nations is the Republic of South Sudan's foremost diplomatic representative to the United Nations, and in charge of the Republic of South Sudan Mission to the United Nations (SUD-MIS). South Sudan permanent representatives to the UN hold the personal rank of ambassador. The full official title and style is His Excellency Permanent Representative from South Sudan to the United Nations. The position was formed and filled on 19 September 2012 by Francis Deng.

== Permanent representatives to the United Nations ==
#	Officeholder	Term start date	Time in office	Notes
1	Francis Deng	19 September 2012	3 years	
2	Akuei Bona Malwal	5 July 2016	6 years	
3	Alier Deng Ruai Deng	13 June 2023	3 years	
