= Responsibility to protect =

2005 UN global political commitment

The responsibility to protect (R2P or RtoP) is a global political commitment that was endorsed by the United Nations (UN) General Assembly at the 2005 World Summit in order to address its four key concerns: preventing genocide, war crimes, ethnic cleansing, and crimes against humanity. The R2P doctrine has become a unanimous and well-established international norm since the early 2000s.

The principle of the responsibility to protect is based upon the underlying premise that sovereignty entails a responsibility to protect all populations from mass atrocity crimes and human rights violations. The R2P is based on respect for the norms and principles of international law, especially the underlying principles of law concerning sovereignty, peace and security, human rights, and armed conflict. The R2P has three pillars:

1. Pillar I—The protection responsibilities of the state: "Each individual state has the responsibility to protect its population from genocide, war crimes, ethnic cleansing, and crimes against humanity."
2. Pillar II—International assistance and capacity-building: States pledge to assist each other in their protection responsibilities.
3. Pillar III—Timely and decisive collective response: If any state is "manifestly failing" in its protection responsibilities, then states should take collective action to protect the population.

While there is agreement among states on the responsibility to protect, there is persistent contestation over the applicability of the third pillar in practice. R2P provides a framework for employing existing measures—that is, mediation, early warning mechanisms, economic sanctions, and powers from Chapter VII of the UN Charter—to prevent atrocity crimes and protect civilians from their occurrence. The authority to employ force under the framework of the responsibility to protect rests solely with the UN Security Council (UNSC) and is considered a measure of last resort.

The doctrine of the responsibility to protect has been the subject of considerable debate, particularly about the implementation of the principle by various actors in the context of country-specific situations, such as in Kenya, Libya, Syria, Nagorno-Karabakh, and Palestine.

== Definition ==
The responsibility to protect was unanimously adopted by member states of the UN General Assembly at the 2005 World Summit. This responsibility was articulated in paragraphs 138–139 of the 2005 World Summit Outcome Document, followed by a statement of support in paragraph 140:

138. Each individual State has the responsibility to protect its populations from genocide, war crimes, ethnic cleansing, and crimes against humanity. This responsibility entails the prevention of such crimes, including their incitement, through appropriate and necessary means. We accept that responsibility and will act in accordance with it. The international community should, as appropriate, encourage and help States fulfill this responsibility and support the United Nations in establishing an early warning capability.

139. The international community, through the United Nations, also has the responsibility to use appropriate diplomatic, humanitarian and other peaceful means, in accordance with Chapters VI and VIII of the Charter, to help protect populations from genocide, war crimes, ethnic cleansing and crimes against humanity. In this context, we are prepared to take collective action, in a timely and decisive manner, through the Security Council, in accordance with the Charter, including Chapter VII, on a case-by-case basis and in cooperation with relevant regional organizations as appropriate, should peaceful means be inadequate and national authorities manifestly fail to protect their populations from genocide, war crimes, ethnic cleansing and crimes against humanity. We stress the need for the General Assembly to continue consideration of the responsibility to protect populations from genocide, war crimes, ethnic cleansing and crimes against humanity and its implications, bearing in mind the principles of the Charter and international law. We also intend to commit ourselves, as necessary and appropriate, to helping States build capacity to protect their populations from genocide, war crimes, ethnic cleansing and crimes against humanity and to assisting those which are under stress before crises and conflicts break out.

140. We fully support the mission of the Special Adviser of the Secretary-General on the Prevention of Genocide.

The above paragraphs in the 2005 World Summit Outcome Document serve as the basis for the intergovernmental agreement on the responsibility to protect. The UN General Assembly adopted the 2005 World Summit Outcome Document in its 2005 Resolution 60/1. The Assembly subsequently committed to continue considering the responsibility to protect with Resolution A/Res/63/308 of October 2009. The UN Security Council first reaffirmed the responsibility to protect in Resolution 1674 (2006)—on the protection of civilians in armed conflict—recalling in particular paragraphs 138 and 139 of the 2005 Summit Outcome Document about the responsibility to protect populations from genocide, war crimes, ethnic cleansing, and crimes against humanity.

=== Scope and limitations ===
The report of the International Commission on Intervention and State Sovereignty, which first articulated the responsibility to protect in its December 2001 report, envisioned a wide scope of application in its articulation of the principle. This scope included "overwhelming natural or environmental catastrophes, where the state concerned is either unwilling or unable to cope, or call for assistance, and significant loss of life is occurring or threatened."

Heads of state and government at the 2005 World Summit refined the scope of the R2P to the four crimes mentioned in paragraphs 138 and 139 of the Outcome Document—namely genocide, war crimes, ethnic cleansing, and crimes against humanity—which are commonly referred to as 'atrocity crimes' or 'mass atrocity crimes'.

As stated in the Secretary-General's 2009 report on the responsibility to protect, Implementing the Responsibility to Protect:

The responsibility to protect applies, until Member States decide otherwise, only to the four specified crimes and violations: genocide, war crimes, ethnic cleansing, and crimes against humanity ... To try to extend it to cover other calamities, such as HIV/AIDS, climate change or the response to natural disasters, would undermine the 2005 consensus and stretch the concept beyond recognition or operational utility.

The focused scope is part of what the UN Secretary-General has termed a "narrow but deep approach" to the responsibility to protect: a narrow application to four crimes, but a deep approach to responding, employing the wide array of instruments for prevention and protection that are available to member states, the United Nations system, regional and subregional organizations, and civil society.

=== Three pillars ===
The responsibility to protect consists of three important and mutually-reinforcing pillars, as articulated in the 2009 report of the Secretary-General on the issue, which build on paragraphs 138 and 139 of the 2005 World Summit Outcome Document and the intergovernmental agreement on principle:

1. Pillar I—The protection responsibilities of the state: "Each individual state has the responsibility to protect its population from genocide, war crimes, ethnic cleansing, and crimes against humanity."
2. Pillar II—International assistance and capacity-building: States pledge to assist each other in fulfilling their protection responsibilities.
3. Pillar III—Timely and decisive collective response: If any state is "manifestly failing" in its protection responsibilities, then states should take collective action to protect the population.

While there is widespread agreement among states about the responsibility to protect (only Cuba, Nicaragua, Venezuela, and Sudan have questioned its validity), there is persistent contestation about the applicability of the third pillar in practice.

According to the UN Secretary-General's 2012 report, the three pillars of the R2P are not sequential and are of equal importance. "Without all three, the concept would be incomplete. All three pillars must be implemented in a manner fully consistent with the purposes, principles, and provisions of the Charter." The pillared approach is intended to reinforce, not undermine state sovereignty. As noted in the 2009 report of the Secretary-General, "By helping States to meet their core protection responsibilities, the responsibility to protect seeks to strengthen sovereignty, not weaken it. It seeks to help States to succeed, not just to react when they fail."

=== Humanitarian intervention ===
The responsibility to protect differs from humanitarian intervention in four important ways.

First, humanitarian intervention refers only to the use of military force, whereas the responsibility to protect (R2P) is first and foremost a preventive principle that emphasizes a range of measures to stem the risk of genocide, war crimes, ethnic cleansing, and crimes against humanity before such crimes are threatened or occur. The use of force may only be carried out as a measure of last resort, when all other non-coercive measures have failed, and only when it is authorized by the UN Security Council. This principle contrasts with the principle of humanitarian intervention, which claims to allow for the use of force as a humanitarian imperative without authorization by the Security Council.

The second point relates to the first point. As a principle, the responsibility to protect is rooted firmly in existing international law, especially the law relating to sovereignty, peace and security, human rights, and armed conflict.

Third, while humanitarian interventions have previously been justified in the context of various situations, R2P focuses only on the four mass atrocity crimes: genocide, war crimes, crimes against humanity and ethnic cleansing. The first three of these crimes are clearly defined in international law and codified in the Rome Statute of the International Criminal Court, the treaty that established the International Criminal Court. Ethnic cleansing is not a crime defined under international law, but it has been defined by the UN as "a purposeful policy designed by one ethnic or religious group to remove by violent and terror-inspiring means the civilian population of another ethnic or religious group from certain geographic areas".

Finally, while humanitarian intervention assumes a "right to intervene", the R2P is based on a "responsibility to protect". Humanitarian intervention and the R2P both agree on the fact that sovereignty is not absolute. However, the R2P doctrine shifts away from state-centered motivations to the interests of victims, by focusing not on the right of states to intervene but on a responsibility to protect populations at risk. In addition, this doctrine introduces a new way of regarding the essence of sovereignty—moving away from issues of "control" and emphasizing "responsibility" to one's own citizens and the wider international community.

== History ==
=== 1990s: origins ===
The norm of the R2P was born out of the international community's failure to respond to tragedies such as the Rwandan genocide in 1994 and the Srebrenica genocide in 1995. Kofi Annan, who was Assistant Secretary-General at the UN Department for Peacekeeping Operations during the Rwandan genocide, realized the international community's failure to respond. In the wake of the Kosovo intervention in 1999, Annan insisted that traditional notions of sovereignty had been redefined: "States are now widely understood to be instruments at the service of their peoples", he said, while US President Bill Clinton cited human rights concerns in 46% of the hundreds of remarks that he made justifying intervention in Kosovo. In 2000, in his capacity as UN Secretary-General, Annan wrote the report "We the Peoples" on the role of the United Nations in the 21st century. In this report, he posed the following question: "if humanitarian intervention is, indeed, an unacceptable assault on sovereignty, how should we respond to a Rwanda, to a Srebrenica—to gross and systematic violations of human rights that offend every precept of our common humanity?"

=== 2000: African Union proposes a right to intervene ===
The African Union (AU) claimed a responsibility to intervene in crises if a state is failing to protect its population from mass atrocity crimes. In 2000, the AU incorporated the right to intervene in a member state, as enshrined in Article 4(h) of its Constitutive Act, which declares "[t]he right of the Union to intervene in a Member State pursuant to a decision of the Assembly in respect of grave circumstances, namely war crimes, genocide and crimes against humanity". The AU also adopted the Ezulwini Consensus in 2005, which welcomed R2P as a tool for preventing mass atrocities.

=== 2000: International Commission on Intervention and State Sovereignty ===
In September 2000, following an appeal by its Foreign Minister Lloyd Axworthy, the Canadian government established the International Commission on Intervention and State Sovereignty (ICISS) to answer Annan's question "if humanitarian intervention is, indeed, an unacceptable assault on sovereignty, how should we respond to a Rwanda, to a Srebrenica—to gross and systematic violations of human rights that offend every precept of our common humanity?" In February 2001, at the third roundtable meeting of the ICISS in London, Gareth Evans, Mohamed Sahnoun, and Michael Ignatieff suggested the phrase "responsibility to protect" as a way to avoid the "right to intervene" or "obligation to intervene" doctrines, and yet maintain a degree of duty to act to resolve humanitarian crises.

In 2001, ICISS released a report titled "The Responsibility to Protect". In a radical reformulation of the meaning of state sovereignty, the report argued that sovereignty entailed not only rights but also responsibilities, specifically a state's responsibility to protect its people from major violations of human rights. This idea rested on earlier work by Francis Deng and Roberta Cohen about internally displaced persons. Inspiration may also be attributed to Swedish diplomat Jan Eliasson; in response to a questionnaire on internally displaced persons distributed by Deng, Eliasson stated that assisting populations at risk within their own country was "basically a question of striking a balance between sovereignty and solidarity with people in need". The ICISS report further asserted that, where a state was "unable or unwilling" to protect its people, responsibility should shift to the international community and "the principle of non-intervention yields to the international responsibility to protect." The ICISS argued that any form of military intervention is "an exceptional and extraordinary measure"; as such, to be justified, it must meet certain criteria, including the following:

- Just cause: There must be "serious and irreparable harm occurring to human beings, or imminently likely to occur".
- Right intention: The main intention of the military action must be to prevent human suffering.
- Last resort: Every other measure besides military intervention must already have been taken into account. (This criterion does not mean that every measure must have been tried and been shown to fail, but that there are reasonable grounds to believe that only military action would work in that situation.)
- Proportionate means: The military means must not exceed what is necessary "to secure the defined human protection objective".
- Reasonable prospects: The chance of success must be reasonably high, and it must be unlikely that the consequences of military intervention would be worse than the consequences of no intervention.
- Right authority: The military action must have been authorized by the Security Council.

=== 2005 World Summit outcome document ===
As the ICISS report was released in 2001, around the time of the Second Gulf War in Iraq, many people thought that this war would end the new R2P norm. However, at the 2005 World Summit—where most heads of state and government in the UN's history convened—the R2P was unanimously adopted. While the outcome was close to the ideas in the ICISS report, there were notable differences: the R2P would then apply only to mass atrocity crimes (genocide, war crimes, crimes against humanity and ethnic cleansing), rather than human rights violations; no mention was made of criteria for intervention; and the UN Security Council became the only body allowed to authorize intervention. The paragraphs of the 2005 World Summit outcome document also stress the importance of regional organizations and the role that they can play through Chapter VIII of the UN Charter.

The results of this summit led world leaders to agree to hold each other accountable if they failed to uphold the new responsibilities. Decidedly, if one state failed to uphold its responsibility, state sovereignty might be violated in order to protect people in danger of mass atrocity crimes. Initially, peaceful action should be taken through humanitarian, diplomatic, or other means. If these means fail to resolve the matter, the international community should come together in a "timely and decisive manner". This process shall be worked on, on a case-by-case basis, through the UN Security Council and the UN Charter.

=== Secretary-General's 2009 report ===
On 12 January 2009, UN Secretary-General Ban Ki-moon issued a report entitled Implementing the Responsibility to Protect. The report was the first comprehensive document from the UN Secretariat on the R2P, following Ban's stated commitment to transform the concept into policy. The Secretary-General's report set the tone and direction for discussion of the topic at the UN. The report proposes a three-pillar approach to the R2P:

- Pillar One stresses that states have the primary responsibility to protect their populations from genocide, war crimes, ethnic cleansing, and crimes against humanity.
- Pillar Two addresses the international community's commitment to help states build capacity to protect their populations from genocide, war crimes, ethnic cleansing, and crimes against humanity, and to help those populations under stress before crises and conflicts break out.
- Pillar Three focuses on the responsibility of the international community to act in a timely and decisive manner to prevent and halt genocide, ethnic cleansing, war crimes, and crimes against humanity when a state manifestly fails to protect its populations.

=== Global Centre for the Responsibility to Protect ===
The Global Centre for the Responsibility to Protect (GCR2P) is an international non-governmental organization that conducts research and advocacy for the responsibility to protect. GCR2P is based at the Graduate School and University Center of the City University of New York (CUNY Graduate Center) in New York City, with another office located in Geneva.

== United Nations ==
At the 2005 World Summit, UN member states included R2P in the outcome document, agreeing to paragraphs 138 and 139 as written in its definition. These paragraphs gave final language to the scope of R2P. It applies to the four mass atrocity crimes only. It also identifies to whom the R2P protocol applies; i.e., nations first, and regional and international communities second. Since then, the UN has been actively engaged in the development of the R2P. Several resolutions, reports, and debates have emerged through the UN forum.

=== Security Council ===
The Security Council has reaffirmed its commitment to the R2P in more than 80 resolutions. The first such resolution came in April 2006, when the Security Council reaffirmed the provisions of paragraphs 138 and 139 in Resolution 1674, formalizing their support for the R2P. In 2009, the Council again recognized states' primary responsibility to protect and reaffirmed paragraphs 138 and 139 in Resolution 1894.

Additionally, the Security Council has mentioned the R2P in several country-specific resolutions:

- Darfur: Resolution 1706 in 2006
- Libya: Resolution 1970, Resolution 1973 in 2011, Resolution 2016 in 2011, and Resolution 2040 in 2012
- Côte d'Ivoire: Resolution 1975 in 2011
- Yemen: Resolution 2014 in 2011
- Mali: Resolution 2085 in 2012 and Resolution 2100 in 2013
- Sudan and South Sudan: Resolution 1996 in 2011 and Resolution 2121 in 2013

=== Secretary-General reports ===
In January 2009, UN Secretary-General Ban Ki-moon released the UN Secretariat's first comprehensive report on the R2P, called Implementing the Responsibility to Protect. His report led to a debate in the General Assembly in July 2009, the first time since 2005 that the General Assembly had met to discuss the R2P. A total of 94 member states spoke. Most states supported the R2P principle, although some important concerns were voiced. The states discussed how to implement the R2P in crises around the world. The debate highlighted three needs: strengthening the role of regional organizations, such as the African Union, in implementing R2P; strengthening early warning mechanisms in the UN; and clarifying the roles that UN bodies would play in implementing R2P.

An outcome of the debate was the first resolution referencing R2P that was adopted by the General Assembly. This resolution (A/RES/63/308) showed that the international community remembered the concept of the R2P, and it decided "to continue its consideration of the responsibility to protect".

In subsequent years, the Secretary-General released a new report, followed by another debate in the General Assembly.

In 2010, the new report was titled Early Warning, Assessment and the Responsibility to Protect. The informal interactive dialogue was held on 9 August 2010; 49 member states, two regional organizations, and two civil society organizations spoke at the event. The discussion had a strongly positive tone, with virtually all speakers stressing the need to prevent atrocities, as well as agreeing that effective early warning is a necessary condition for effective prevention and early action. Objections were expressed by a small number of member states—namely Nicaragua, Iran, Pakistan, Sudan, and Venezuela.

In 2011, the new report analyzed The Role of Regional and Subregional Arrangements in Implementing the Responsibility to Protect. At the debate on 12 July 2011, statements were made by 43 member states, three regional organizations, and four civil society representatives. The biggest challenge to R2P was considered to be cooperation with, and support between, the UN and regional bodies in times of crisis. Member states acknowledged the importance of resolving this challenge through the unique advantages that regional organizations possess in preventing and reacting to mass atrocities.

In 2012, the new focus was on the Responsibility to Protect: Timely and Decisive Response. The debate that followed on 5 September 2012 included statements addressing the third pillar of the R2P, along with the diversity of non-coercive and coercive measures available for a collective response to mass atrocity crimes.

In 2013, the Secretary-General focused on Responsibility to Protect: State responsibility and prevention. The debate following the report was held on 11 September 2013. A panel of UN, member-state, and civil-society experts delivered presentations, after which 68 member states, 1 regional organization, and 2 civil society organizations made statements.

=== Special Advisers on the Prevention of Genocide and the Responsibility to Protect ===
In 2004, following the genocidal violence in Rwanda and the Balkans, UN Secretary-General Kofi Annan appointed Juan E. Méndez as special adviser to fill critical gaps in the international system that allowed those tragedies to go unchecked. In 2007, Secretary-General Ban Ki-moon appointed Francis M. Deng on a full-time basis at the level of Under-Secretary-General. Around the same time, the Secretary-General also appointed Edward Luck as the special adviser focusing on the R2P on a part-time basis at the level of Assistant Secretary-General.

The Special Adviser on the Responsibility to Protect leads the conceptual, political, institutional, and operational development of the R2P. The Special Adviser on the Prevention of Genocide acts as a catalyst to raise awareness of the causes and dynamics of genocide, to alert relevant actors where there is a risk of genocide, and to advocate and mobilize for appropriate action. The mandates of the two special advisers are distinct but complementary. The efforts of their office include three activities: alerting relevant actors to the risk of genocide, war crimes, ethnic cleansing, and crimes against humanity; enhancing the capacity of the UN to prevent these crimes, including their incitement; and working with member states, regional and subregional arrangements, and civil society to develop more effective means of response when crimes occur.

Both special advisers Deng and Luck ended their assignments with the office in July 2012. On 17 July 2012, Secretary-General Ban Ki-moon appointed Adama Dieng of Senegal as his Special Adviser on the Prevention of Genocide. On 12 July 2013, Jennifer Welsh of Canada was appointed as the Special Adviser on the Responsibility to Protect.

== In practice ==
=== Kenya, 2007–2008 ===
From December 2007 to January 2008, Kenya was swept by a wave of ethnic violence that was triggered by a disputed presidential election held on 27 December 2007. On 30 December 2007, Mwai Kibaki was declared the winner of this presidential election and was sworn in as president a couple of hours later. The announcement of the results triggered widespread and systematic violence, resulting in more than 1,000 deaths and the displacement of more than 500,000 civilians. The clashes were characterized by the ethnically targeted killings of people aligned with the two major political parties, the Orange Democratic Movement (ODM) and the Party of National Unity (PNU).

External intervention followed almost immediately. French Foreign and European Affairs Minister Bernard Kouchner appealed to the UN Security Council in January 2008 to react "in the name of the responsibility to protect" before Kenya plunged into a deadly ethnic conflict. On 31 December 2007, UN Secretary-General Ban Ki-moon issued a statement expressing concern for the ongoing violence, as well as calling for the population to remain calm and for Kenyan security forces to show restraint. On 10 January 2008, former UN Secretary-General Kofi Annan was accepted by both the ODM and the PNU as the African Union's chief mediator. Mediation efforts led to the signing of a power-sharing agreement on 28 February 2008. This agreement established Mwai Kibaki as president and Raila Odinga as prime minister, and it created three commissions: the Commission of Inquiry on Post-Election Violence; the Truth, Justice and Reconciliation Commission; and the Independent Review Commission on the General Elections. This rapid and coordinated reaction by the international community was praised by Human Rights Watch as "a model of diplomatic action under the 'Responsibility to Protect' principles".

=== Ivory Coast, 2011 ===
On 30 March 2011, in response to escalating post-election violence against the population of Ivory Coast in late 2010 and early 2011, the Security Council unanimously adopted Resolution 1975 condemning the gross human rights violations committed by supporters of both ex-President Laurent Gbagbo and President Alassane Ouattara. The resolution cited "the primary responsibility of each State to protect civilians"; called for the immediate transfer of power to President Ouattara, the victor in the elections; and reaffirmed that the United Nations Operation in Ivory Coast (UNOCI) could use "all necessary means to protect life and property". On 4 April 2011, in an effort to protect the people of Ivory Coast from further atrocities, UNOCI began a military operation, and President Gbagbo's hold on power ended on 11 April when he was arrested by President Ouattara's forces. In November 2011, President Gbagbo was transferred to the International Criminal Court to face charges of crimes against humanity as an "indirect co-perpetrator" of murder, rape, persecution, and other inhumane acts. On 26 July 2012, the Council adopted Resolution 2062 renewing the mandate of UNOCI until 31 July 2013. The mission officially ended on 30 June 2017.

=== Libya, 2011 ===
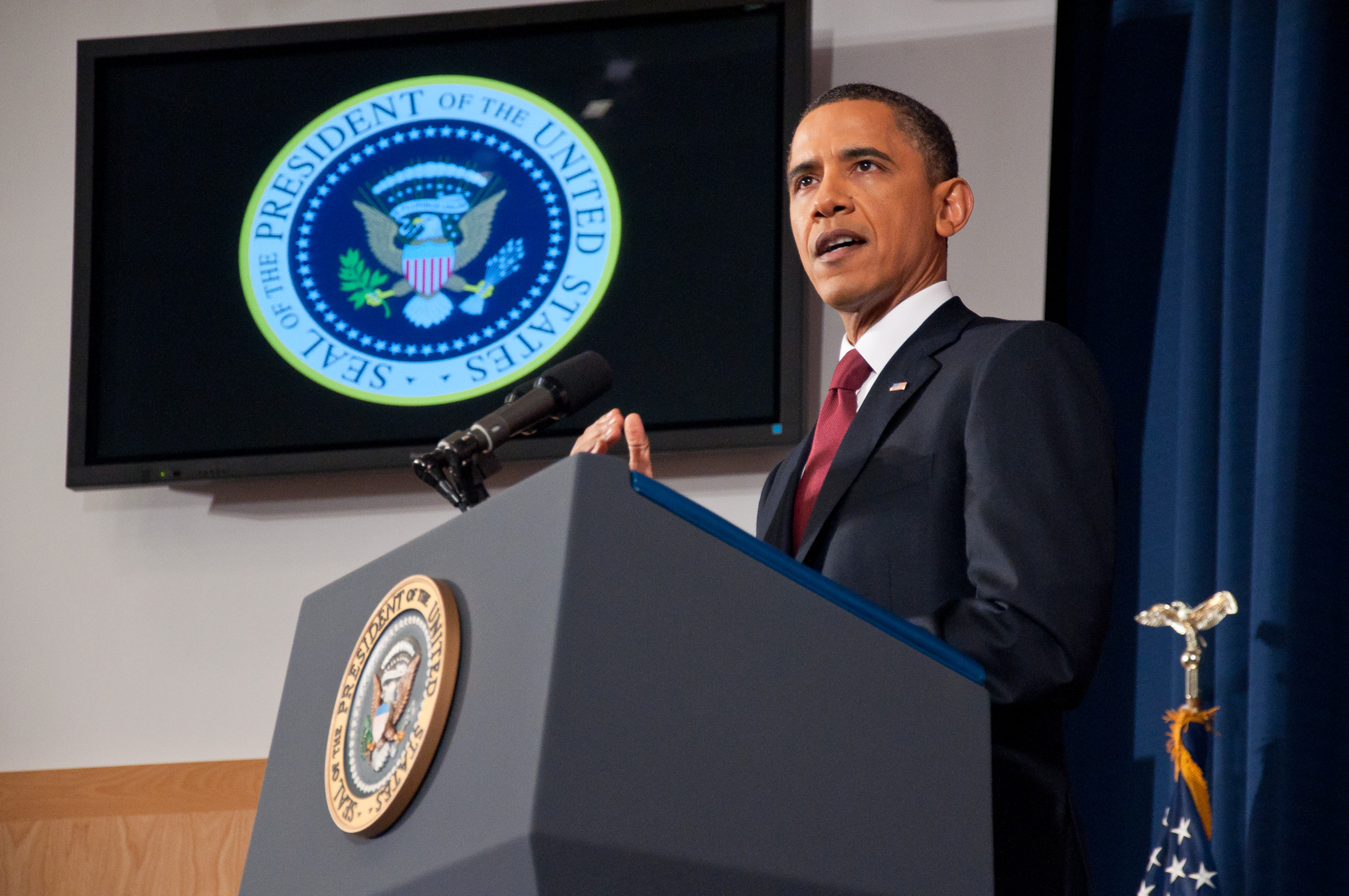
Former US President Barack Obama speaking on the military intervention in Libya at the National Defense University in Washington, D.C.

Libya was the first case where the Security Council authorized a military intervention citing the R2P. Following widespread and systematic attacks against the civilian population by the Libyan regime, and language used by Muammar Gaddafi that reminded the international community of the genocide in Rwanda, the Security Council unanimously adopted Resolution 1970 on 26 February 2011, making explicit reference to the R2P. Deploring what it called "the gross and systematic violation of human rights" in strife-torn Libya, the Security Council demanded an end to the violence, "recalling the Libyan authorities' responsibility to protect its population", and imposed a series of international sanctions. The Council also decided to refer the situation to the International Criminal Court.

In Resolution 1973, adopted on 17 March 2011, the Security Council demanded an immediate ceasefire in Libya, including an end to ongoing attacks against civilians, which it said might constitute "crimes against humanity". The Council authorized member states to take "all necessary measures" to protect civilians under threat of attack in the country, while excluding a foreign occupation force of any form on any part of Libyan territory. A few days later, acting on the resolution, North Atlantic Treaty Organization (NATO) planes started striking at Gaddafi's forces. NATO subsequently came under scrutiny for its behavior during the air strikes; concerns included the fact that the intervention quickly moved to regime change and that there were allegations regarding aerial bombardments that may have caused civilian casualties.

=== Central African Republic, 2013 ===
In December 2012, a loose rebel coalition named the Séléka initiated a military campaign to overthrow the government of the Central African Republic (CAR) and its then-president, François Bozizé. The Séléka, composed mostly of factions of armed groups in the northeast of the state, accused Bozizé's government of neglecting their region. The coalition rapidly captured several strategic towns and was poised to take the capital city of Bangui. A hasty intervention by Chad and the Economic Community of Central African States (ECCAS) persuaded the Séléka to negotiate with Bozizé's government. The result, the Libreville Agreement of January 2013, installed a three-year power-sharing arrangement.

However, ECCAS failed to monitor the implementation of the Libreville Agreement, and Bozizé did not undertake any of the reforms necessary under the transition agreement. Séléka resurged, and it took control of Bangui and fifteen of CAR's sixteen provinces on 24 March 2013. Séléka's leader, Michel Djotodia, proclaimed himself president, set up the National Transitional Council (NTC), and suspended CAR's constitution. A hurried ECCAS summit on 4 April 2013, which did not yet recognize Djotodia as president, called for the creation of a Transitional National Council (TNC); this council would create a new constitution, conduct elections in eighteen months, and select an interim president. On 13 April, the TNC chose the sole candidate vying for the interim president position, Michel Djotodia.

From December 2012 onward, Séléka forces, who are predominantly Muslim, committed grave human rights abuses against civilians throughout the country, targeting the Christian population, according to Human Rights Watch. In response, Christian civilians formed the Anti-balaka coalition of militias, which committed various atrocities against the Muslim minority. Extrajudicial killings of Muslim and Christian civilians have been carried out, including "door-to-door" searches by rival militias and mobs seeking potential victims.

This violence caused mass displacement. According to OCHA, by September 2013, there were almost 400,000 internally displaced people and about 65,000 new refugees in neighboring countries. Humanitarian agencies alerted the public to the critical situation, stressing that 2.3 million CAR citizens (half the population) needed humanitarian assistance.

The situation in CAR deteriorated rapidly after 5 December 2013, after an attack in Bangui by Anti-balaka militias and loyalists of ousted President François Bozizé. This attack against former Séléka rebels sparked widespread violence throughout the capital as well as in Ouham province in the northwest. The violence marked a significant escalation of the conflict in CAR. Anti-balaka forces launched another attack against Muslim neighborhoods in Bangui on 20 December, spurring a cycle of renewed violence that led to at least 71 deaths by 24 December. A mass grave of at least 30 people who were reportedly executed and also exhibited signs of torture was discovered on 25 December. The UN Office for the Coordination of Humanitarian Affairs (OCHA) estimates a further 40 civilians were killed on 25 December as violence continued between Anti-balaka and ex-Séléka forces. Eight African Union (AU) peacekeepers were also killed between 25 and 26 December.

==== CAR and the R2P ====
The crisis in the CAR was a case for the R2P, because of mass atrocity crimes being committed by both sides. During a Security Council briefing on 25 November, UN Deputy-Secretary-General Jan Eliasson said that the world faced "a profoundly important test of international solidarity and of our responsibility to protect" in CAR. The Security Council passed Resolution 2127 on 5 December, emphasizing that the NTC has the primary responsibility to protect the civilian population in CAR. This resolution granted a Chapter VII mandate to AU and French forces to protect civilians and restore security; imposed an arms embargo; and established a UN Commission of Inquiry.

Initially, the international response to the coup was purely diplomatic: members of the International Contact Group insisted that Michel Djotodia respect the principles set out in the Libreville agreement. The African Union was the first to react when it announced a new African-led International Support Mission for CAR (MISCA) in July 2013. However, MISCA was ineffective in reversing the deteriorating security situation. Although its mandate was well-defined, there was general agreement that it lacked the resources to fulfill its mission. The UN General Assembly put CAR on the international agenda in September of that year. Resolution 2121, adopted on 10 October 2013 and sponsored by France, strengthened and broadened the mandate of the UN Integrated Peacebuilding Office in the Central African Republic (BINUCA). Aware that MISCA alone could not adequately tackle the growing insecurity, France changed its initial position from disengagement to military contribution—as François Hollande announced on 20 November 2013, French forces would be reinforced by almost 1,000 troops for six months. France began to deploy troops in CAR after receiving authorization from the Security Council on 5 December 2013 through Resolution 2127, which authorized MISCA and French forces to take "all necessary measures" to protect civilians and restore security in CAR. French soldiers immediately began to patrol in Bangui.

=== Iran 2026 ===
In January 2026, following the peak of the 2026 Iran massacres—in which Iranian authorities massacred Iranian protesters calling for political change—the human-rights advocacy organization Hengaw argued on 13 January that the massacres of protesters were crimes against humanity under customary international law and the Rome Statute, and it called for the R2P to be invoked. Hengaw called for "the international community [to] seriously consider all lawful mechanisms provided under international law, including binding coercive measures under the Charter of the United Nations" whose aim is "not political intervention, but the immediate and effective protection of civilian lives and the cessation of mass killings". On 24 January, Hengaw again called for the R2P to be invoked, stating that the evidence for crimes against humanity having been committed was fully verifiable.

== Praise ==
Political scientist Anne-Marie Slaughter of Princeton University has called R2P "the most important shift in our conception of sovereignty since the Treaty of Westphalia in 1648".

Louise Arbour from the International Crisis Group said that "The responsibility to protect is the most important and imaginative doctrine to emerge on the international scene for decades."

Francis Deng, former UN Special Adviser on the Prevention of Genocide, stated that the "R2P is one of the most powerful and promising innovations on the international scene."

Political scientist Alex Bellamy argued two points: first, there is evidence of behavioral change in the way that international society responds to mass killing; second, the R2P considerations have influenced behavior. On the first point, Bellamy argued that criticism of the R2P as insufficient change is driven by a small subset of cases (i.e., Darfur, Libya, and Syria) that do not indicate strong trends. On the second point, Bellamy found that the R2P language is used in UN Security Council deliberations and in the rhetoric of world leaders.

International relations professor Amitai Etzioni noted that the R2P challenged the Westphalian norm that state sovereignty is "absolute". The R2P establishes "conditional" state sovereignty contingent upon fulfilling certain domestic and international obligations. Etzioni considered the R2P norm of conditional sovereignty to be a communitarian approach, because it recognizes that states have the right to self-determination and self-governance, but they also have a responsibility to the international community to protect the environment, promote peace, and not harm their state’s inhabitants.

== Criticism and discussion ==
The doctrine of the responsibility to protect has been the subject of considerable debate, particularly about the implementation of the principle by various actors in the context of country-specific situations, such as in Libya, Syria, Sudan, Kenya, Venezuela, Myanmar, and Palestine.

=== Cases ===
==== Libya (2011) ====
On 19 March 2011, the UN Security Council approved Resolution 1973, which reiterated the responsibility of the Libyan authorities to protect the country's population. The UNSC resolution reaffirmed "that parties to armed conflicts bear the primary responsibility to take all feasible steps to ensure the protection of civilians." This resolution demanded the following:

... an immediate ceasefire in Libya, including an end to the current attacks against civilians, which it said might constitute 'crimes against humanity'.... It imposed a ban on all flights in the country's airspace, a no-fly zone, and tightened sanctions on the Gaddafi government and its supporters.

The resolution passed, with 10 states in favor, 0 against, and 5 abstentions. Two of the five abstentions were China and Russia, both of which are permanent members of the Security Council.

India's UN Ambassador Hardeep Singh Puri stated that "the Libyan case has already given R2P a bad name" and that "the only aspect of the resolution of interest to them (international community) was use of all necessary means to bomb the hell out of Libya". Puri also alleged that civilians had been supplied with arms and that the no-fly zone had been implemented only selectively.

Critics, such as Russia and China, said that the intervening forces led by NATO in Libya had overstepped their mandate by taking actions that ultimately led to the overthrow of Gaddafi. While the Security Council authorized an R2P-based intervention to protect against government reprisals in rebel-held Benghazi, the UN resolution was used to provide air support for the rebellion against Gaddafi, without which he would not have been overthrown. Critics said that the actions of the West in Libya created global skepticism about proposals put to the UN by the West to intervene in Syria that same year, putting the future of the R2P in question.

==== Syria (2011) ====
From 2011 to 2024, allegations of mass atrocities in Syria during a civil war—including findings by a UN Commission of Inquiry that government forces and allied militias committed war crimes and crimes against humanity—prompted extensive international diplomatic and humanitarian engagement, but limited action under the responsibility to protect. The UN, the International Syria Support Group, the European Union, and the League of Arab States all pursued measures consistent with the R2P’s preventive and assistance pillars. These measures included support for humanitarian access centered on implementing UN Security Council Resolution 2254 and pursuing nationwide ceasefires; however, aid delivery remained constrained. Some states, particularly the United States, attempted to secure Security Council action explicitly framed through the R2P and potentially enabling military intervention; these efforts were repeatedly vetoed by Russia and China, which argued that earlier intervention in Libya had been used to pursue regime change. The Syrian case is cited as illustrating how the rhetoric of the R2P is instrumentalized globally, as well as its practical limits when Security Council consensus for enforcement measures cannot be achieved.

==== Nagorno-Karabakh/Artsakh (2023) ====
Multiple commentators cited Azerbaijan's blockade and expulsion of the Armenians of Nagorno-Karabakh (Artsakh) as a case that fell within the crimes that the R2P doctrine was designed to prevent, but that were not addressed.

Commentary on the 2020 Nagorno-Karabakh War and the ceasefire noted that the unresolved political status of Nagorno-Karabakh maintained insecurity for the population. Sevan Garibian, professor in international criminal law, characterized the UN Security Council’s limited action as significant, because three permanent members of the Council cochaired the Organization for Security and Co-operation in Europe (OSCE) Minsk Group—which was tasked with resolving the Nagorno-Karabakh conflict. Sheila Paylan, former legal adviser for the United Nations, wrote:

Against a background of state-sponsored anti-Armenian violence and hate speech … well-documented evidence of cultural genocide, and at least 100,000 [Armenians] having been forced to flee … one can’t help but wonder how much higher the threshold of unbearable persecution has to be to warrant remedial secession or other intervention under R2P.

Professor Lily Svanberg argued that failing to enforce the R2P doctrine makes Hitler’s remark "Who, after all, speaks today of the annihilation of the Armenians?" disturbingly relevant, because impunity for past atrocities continues to inspire genocidal acts such as Azerbaijan's expulsion of Armenians from Nagorno-Karabakh.

For the Armenians of Nagorno-Karabakh, certain sources advocated remedial secession or recognition of their self-declared republic as a strategy to protect the population, since persistent persecution made internal self-determination and safety within Azerbaijan untenable. Alfred-Maurice de Zayas, a UN independent expert, drew parallels between the situation in Nagorno-Karabakh and that of Albanian Kosovars under Slobodan Milošević; de Zayas added that "it is not the right of self-determination that causes wars but the unjust denial thereof. Hence, it is time to recognize that the realization of the right of self-determination is a conflict-prevention strategy."

==== Gaza, 2023 ====
Jeremy Moses wrote that the lack of mention of the R2P in the debates about how to respond to the Israeli invasion of the Gaza Strip in 2023 "reveals the fundamental weaknesses of the doctrine", given that information about the crimes committed by the Israeli military in Gaza is widely known internationally. Researcher Ernesto Verdeja wrote that the lack of international response to atrocities in Gaza either solidified the marginalization of the R2P or at least revealed that it is irrelevant.

==== Sudan, 2023 ====
The Australian Institute of International Affairs noted that the R2P has failed in Sudan. Global observers are calling for the R2P to be invoked.

=== Discussion, themes, and issues ===
==== West centrism ====
It's observed that R2P tends to be invoked when intervention would coincide with the interests of Western states, but not when intervention would be perceived as counter to Western interests.

==== National sovereignty ====
One of the main concerns surrounding the R2P is that it infringes upon national sovereignty.

This concern was rebutted by UN Secretary-General Ban Ki-moon in the report Implementing the Responsibility to Protect. According to the first pillar of the R2P, the state has the responsibility to protect its populations from mass atrocities and ethnic cleansing; according to the second pillar, the international community has the responsibility to help states to fulfill their responsibility.

Advocates of the R2P claim that the only occasions when the international community intervenes in a state without its consent are when the state is either allowing mass atrocities to occur or is committing these atrocities—in which case the state is no longer upholding its responsibilities as a sovereign. In this sense, the R2P can be understood as reinforcing sovereignty.

In 2004, the High-level Panel on Threats, Challenges and Change—established by UN Secretary-General Kofi Annan—endorsed the emerging norm of the R2P. This panel stated that there is a collective international responsibility "... exercisable by the Security Council authorizing military intervention as a last resort, in the event of genocide and other large-scale killing, ethnic cleansing, and serious violations of humanitarian law which sovereign governments have proved powerless or unwilling to prevent."

==== Military intervention ====
The question of military intervention under the third pillar of the R2P remains controversial.

Several states have argued that the R2P should not allow the international community to intervene militarily in states, because to do so is an infringement upon sovereignty. Other states have argued that such military intervention is a necessary facet of the R2P, and it is necessary as a last resort to stop mass atrocities.

A related argument surrounds the question of whether more specific criteria should be developed to determine when the Security Council should authorize military intervention.

==== Structural problems ====
Political scientist Roland Paris, a proponent of the R2P, argued that several problems with usefulness and legitimacy inherent to the R2P make the doctrine vulnerable to criticism: "the more R2P is employed as a basis for military action, the more likely it is to be discredited, but paradoxically, the same will hold if R2P's coercive tools go unused."

Paris lists the following problems as inherent to the R2P, making it difficult for proponents of the doctrine to defend it, and emboldening critics:

- The mixed-motives problem—The legitimacy of the R2P rests upon its altruistic aim. However, states are often wary of engaging in humanitarian intervention unless the intervention is partly rooted in self-interest. The appearance that the intervention is not strictly altruistic consequently leads some to question its legitimacy.
- The counterfactual problem—When the R2P is successful, there is no clear-cut evidence of its success: that is, a mass atrocity that did not occur, but which would have occurred without intervention. Defenders of the R2P consequently must rely on counterfactual arguments.
- The conspicuous harm problem—While the benefits of an intervention are not clearly visible, the destructiveness and costs of the intervention are visible. This problem makes it more difficult for proponents of an intervention to defend it. The destruction caused by an intervention also makes some question the legitimacy of the intervention because of the stated purpose of preventing harm.
- The end-state problem—Humanitarian intervention is prone to expand a mission beyond simply averting mass atrocities. When successful at averting mass atrocities, the interveners are often forced to take upon themselves more expansive mandates to ensure that threatened populations will be safe after the interveners leave.
- The inconsistency problem—Because of these problems—in addition to the belief that a particular military action is likely to cause more harm than good—states may fail to act in situations where mass atrocities loom. The failure to intervene in any and all situations where there is a risk of mass atrocities leads to charges of inconsistency.

=== Cisheteronormative blindfold ===
Researchers Jess Gifkins and Dean Cooper-Cunningham built on long-standing research in genocide studies and on atrocity prevention; this research demonstrates how identity-based violence often lays the groundwork for mass atrocity and conflict escalation. Targeting people based on their (presumed) identities exacerbates the potential for atrocity crimes, a pattern that has persisted throughout history and across various locations—from atrocities committed by the Nazis in Germany, to those committed in Sudan and Yugoslavia. Despite this pattern, Gifkins and Cooper-Cunningham argued, the R2P framework and its application have had a long-standing blind spot about the persecution of people not having heteronormative sexuality and/or not being cisgender. This blind spot results from what the researchers called a "cisheteronormative blindfold": a lack of awareness of how society privileges cisgender and heterosexual identities as the norm, while not recognizing the needs of people who are not cisheteronormative. Not acknowledging the increased vulnerability of queer and transgender people has resulted in substantial tangible repercussions for those discriminated against based on their perceived nonconforming sexual orientation or gender identity.

== See also ==
- Never again
- Right of conquest
- Dahiya doctrine
