= International Commission on Nuclear Non-proliferation and Disarmament =

Joint Australian and Japanese nuclear disarmament organization

- Abbreviation: ICNND
- Formation: 2008
- Type: INGO
- Region served: Worldwide
- Official language: English
- Website: ICNND Official website

The International Commission on Nuclear Non-proliferation and Disarmament is a joint initiative of the Australian and Japanese governments. It was proposed by Australian Prime Minister Kevin Rudd on 9 June 2008, and on 9 July 2008 Rudd and Japanese Prime Minister Yasuo Fukuda agreed to establish it.

The Commission is co-chaired by former Australian foreign minister Gareth Evans and former Japanese foreign minister Yoriko Kawaguchi. Key goals for the Commission include undertaking preparatory work for the Nuclear Non-Proliferation Treaty Review Conference in 2010, including shaping a global consensus in the lead-up to the Review Conference.

The Commission presented its report on 15 December 2009.
