= International Commission on Intervention and State Sovereignty =

International organization

The International Commission on Intervention and State Sovereignty (ICISS) was an ad hoc commission of participants which in 2001 worked to popularize the concept of humanitarian intervention under the name of "Responsibility to protect". The Commission was instigated in the wake of the Kosovo War by Lloyd Axworthy and the Chretien government in September 2000 and co-chaired by Gareth Evans and Mohamed Sahnoun under the authority of the Canadian Government. Part of its membership was from the UN General Assembly.

The ICISS "was funded by the Canadian Government, together with major international foundations including the Carnegie Corporation of New York, the William and Flora Hewlett Foundation, the John D. and Catherine T. MacArthur Foundation, the Rockefeller Foundation, and the Simons Foundation. ICISS was also indebted to the Governments of Switzerland and the United Kingdom for their generous financial and in-kind support to the work of the Commission."

== Synopsis ==
The purpose of the Committee was to arrive at an answer to the question posed by Kofi Annan: "if humanitarian intervention is, indeed, an unacceptable assault on sovereignty, how should we respond to a Rwanda, to a Srebrenica – to gross and systematic violations of human rights that affect every precept of our common humanity?" The question summarizes the ongoing debate between those who value the norm of humanitarian intervention above state sovereignty and vice versa.

A state's sovereignty is also under question. Sovereignty is dependent upon the state's responsibility to its people; if not fulfilled, then the contract between the government and its citizen is void, and thus the sovereignty is not legitimate. In that crucible lies the genesis of the responsibility to protect doctrine.

Research conducted by the ICISS culminated in the ICISS Report, which included recommendations to the international community on the normative debate of humanitarian intervention versus state sovereignty.

One of the aims of the Commission was to direct attention towards the needs of people affected by humanitarian disasters; and subsequently away from questions of whether respect for sovereignty is more important than a moral responsibility to intervene. The Commission stressed stronger reliance upon NGOs, such as the International Committee of the Red Cross, to help prevent humanitarian crisis through assistance.

According to the Commission's website: on release of its report in December 2001, the ICISS completed its mandate. As such, there is no longer a direct point of contact for the Commission. The Government of Canada continues to lead follow up efforts on the findings of the commission.

== Criticism ==
The report, although long, fails to address many key issues that plague this debate. The report added to the existing confusion and several key recommendations are of legal concern. For instance, Sections 4.18–4.21 of the Report show an eagerness to approach the issue of what scale of atrocity necessitates humanitarian intervention. However, the researchers shied away from committing to any concrete definition, with the impetus of the Commission showing through in Section 4.21 of their report:

In both the broad conditions we identified – loss of life and ethnic cleansing – we have described the action in question as needing to be "large scale" in order to justify military intervention. We make no attempt to quantify "large scale": opinions may differ in some marginal cases (for example, where a number of small scale incidents may build cumulatively into large scale atrocity), but most will not in practice generate major disagreement. What we do make clear, however, is that military action can be legitimate as an anticipatory measure in response to clear evidence of likely large scale killing. Without this possibility of anticipatory action, the international community would be placed in the morally untenable position of being required to wait until genocide begins, before being able to take action to stop it.

While the notion of preemptive defense can be supported by an individual state's foreign policy, it is not supported by international humanitarian law nor the UN Charter.

Military intervention on the basis of evidence of a "likely 'large scale' killing" in which large scale is not defined) presents a problem if intent does not follow through with action. One may argue that the genocide (or similar atrocity) did not eventuate because of the military intervention; however, the genocide may have also not eventuated because of natural inaction or reduced support.

Critics of the ICISS Report additionally highlight that ignoring governments that have been weakened by conflict or other disaster is only likely to increase the risk of crises. Political humanitarian crises, such as those exhibited in Rwanda, occur when civil society cannot properly function or repair itself if the government is unable to address key security issues.

According to a writer from the Lowy Institute, as of 2021 the "doctrine of the Responsibility to Protect was meant to stop atrocities. Instead, it has become another empty mantra."

== Members ==
- Gareth Evans (Australia, co-chair),
- Mohamed Sahnoun (Algeria, co-chair),
- Gisèle Côté-Harper (Canada),
- Lee Hamilton (United States),
- Michael Ignatieff (Canada),
- Vladimir Lukin (Russia),
- Klaus Naumann (Germany),
- Cyril Ramaphosa (South Africa),
- Fidel V. Ramos (Philippines),
- Cornelio Sommaruga (Switzerland),
- Eduardo Stein Barillas (Guatemala),
- Ramesh Thakur (India)
