= Layachi Yaker =

Algerian diplomat and politician (1930–2023)

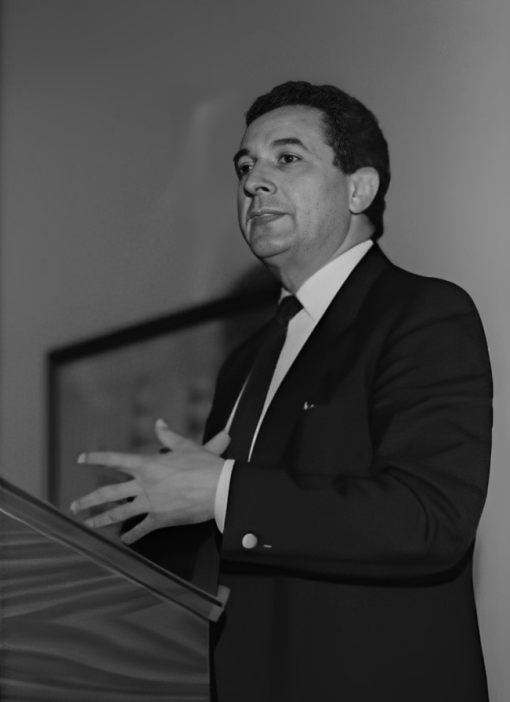
- Layachi Yaker in the 1960s

Minister of Commerce
- In office 9 June 1969 – 23 April 1977

Member of the People's National Assembly for Bir Mourad Raïs
- In office 1977–1979

Secretary-General of the United Nations Economic Commission for Africa
- In office 1992–1995
- Preceded by: Issa Diallo
- Succeeded by: K. Y. Amoako

Personal details
- Born: 11 January 1930 Souk Ahras, French Algeria
- Died: 25 November 2023 (aged 93) Algiers
- Party: FLN
- Children: Farid Yaker, Yacine Yaker et Ourida Yaker
- Occupation: Diplomat, International Politician

Layachi Yaker (Arabic: العياشي ياكر; 11 January 1930 – 25 November 2023) was an Algerian diplomat and politician of the National Liberation Front.

== Biography ==
The eldest of twelve children, Layachi Yaker was born on January 11, 1930, in Souk-Ahras in a family from AIT HALLI, commune of Irdjen, Tizi Ouzou. He engaged at age 17 in the Algerian National Movement in the framework of the Democratic Union of the Algerian Manifesto (UDMA). Self-taught, he combined political action with salaried work while training as an accountant.

Sent to Paris by his firm in order to become a chartered accountant, he was elected vice-president of the General Union of Algerian Muslim Students in July 1955. According to Mohamed Harbi, this was a key election for the communist youth of Algeria for their liberation. During the Algerian War, he was a fundraising agent for the FLN in France.

In February 1957, Taker was arrested by the French government and spent two years and a half in French prisons under the regime of pre-trial detention (La Santé and Fresnes Prison). After several hunger strikes, he obtained the status of political prisoner. He was released on parole in October 1959.

Layachi Yaker joined the Provisional Government of the Algerian Republic (GPRA) in Cairo (Egypt) in January 1961. In November of the same year, he was appointed Representative of the GPRA to India and Bangladesh.

After Algeria's independence in July 1962, Layachi Yaker returned to the country and was appointed a senior official at the Ministry of Foreign Affairs. He was nominated Minister of Commerce in June 1969, serving until April 1977. He then served in the People's National Assembly from 1977 to 1979. From September 1979 to August 1984, he served as Ambassador of Algeria to the UDSSR (1979-1982) and to the USA (1982-1984).

In 1989, he joined the United Nations system. He served as Special Advisor to the Director-General of UNESCO in Paris until 1992, and then as Executive Secretary of the Economic Commission for Africa (ECA) from 1992 to 1995 in Addis Ababa (Ethiopia) and Deputy Secretary-General of the UN.

From 1995 to 1997, Yaker was President of the International Ocean Institute (IOI).

Throughout his career, Layachi Yaker was very actively involved in strengthening and improving relations between developed countries and so-called Third World countries, in particular as a Member of the Brandt Commission and co-editor of the North-South Report.

Layachi Yaker died in Algiers on November 25, 2023, at the age of 93.
