= 2005 World Summit =

United Nations meeting in New York City

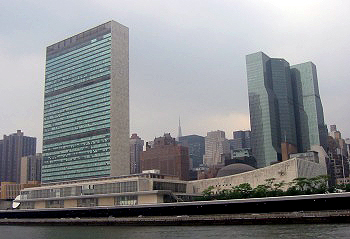
U. N. headquarters in New York City

The 2005 World Summit was a United Nations (UN) summit held between 14 and 16 September 2005 at the UN headquarters in New York City. It was a follow up summit meeting to the UN's 2000 Millennium Summit (which formulated the Millennium Declaration of the Millennium Development Goals).

The 2005 World Summit is known for articulating a responsibility to protect (R2P) in order to address mass atrocities and human rights violations.

== Summit summary ==
The summit was billed as the "largest gathering of world leaders in history", (as was the 2000 summit), and featured appearances of numerous heads of state and heads of government. According to the organizers, about 170 leaders were present. The majority of those present addressed the UN General Assembly and gave speeches reflecting on the UN's past successes and future challenges. All 191 of the then member states gave an address in some form—if the head of state or government was not present, the nation's foreign minister, vice president, or deputy prime minister usually spoke. The meetings were presided over by the prime minister of Sweden, Göran Persson, since Swedish Jan Eliasson was President of the 60th General Assembly. Negotiations for the World Summit Outcome Document had been under the watchful eye of the president of the 59th UNGA, Mr. Jean Ping of Gabon.

The pre-summit negotiations were blown sharply off course by the appearance in early August at the UN of United States ambassador to the UN John Bolton, appointed as a recess appointment by U.S. president George W. Bush. The position had been vacant since January, with responsibilities handled by professional U.S. diplomats. Bolton swiftly issued a list of new demands (including dropping the use of the words "Millennium Development Goals"), which days before the summit had still not been settled. Some observers contended that on the eve of the summit the U.S. struck a more conciliatory tone than expected, something partly credited as a consequence of the outpouring of international support for the U.S. after Hurricane Katrina.

As well as discussing progress on the Millennium Development Goals and re-iterating the world's commitment to them, the summit was convened to address the possible reform of the United Nations; much of this was eventually postponed to a later date. An exception was the endorsement of the "responsibility to protect" (known by the acronyms RtoP and R2P), which had been developed and articulated by a Canadian commission and proposed by Kofi Annan as part of his In Larger Freedom reform package as a means to mobilize international response to four mass atrocity crimes. The "Responsibility to Protect" is a political commitment based in the concept of "Sovereignty as Responsibility" that calls upon governments to prevent and protect their populations from genocide, war crimes, ethnic cleansing and crimes against humanity, and compels the world community the right to respond when governments are unwilling or "manifestly failing to protect their populations" from these crimes. There was also broad agreement at the summit to set up a new Human Rights Council.

During the summit, the United Nations Convention Against Corruption received its thirtieth ratification, and as a result entered into force in December 2005.

The inaugural session of the Clinton Global Initiative, organized by the family of William J. Clinton (former president of the US), was held in New York City to coincide with the 2005 World Summit. This event attracted as many of the same world leaders as the main summit. During his presidency, Clinton has twice hosted more than 150 world leaders during a UN summit, in 1995 and 2000.

== Outcome of the 2005 World Summit ==
At the end of the 2005 Summit the contents of a document, known as the World Summit Outcome Document, were agreed to by the delegations that attended.

It was brought before the United Nations General Assembly for adoption as a resolution on 16 September, where ambassadors made last minute statements and reservations. For example, John Bolton said: "I do wish to make one point clear: the United States understands that reference to the International Conference on Population and Development, the Beijing Declaration and Platform for Action, and the use of the phrase 'reproductive health' in paragraphs 57 (g) and 58 (c) of the outcome document do not create any rights and cannot be interpreted to constitute support, endorsement, or promotion of abortion."

The pressure group The United Nations Association of Great Britain and Northern Ireland (UNA-UK) contend that:

Delegates to the UN Summit have been accused of producing a 'watered-down' outcome document which merely reiterates existing pledges. It is true that there is cause for disappointment, in particular the failure to make progress on Weapons of Mass Destruction. But the document also contains important steps forward including:

1. agreement on the responsibility to protect populations suffering gross human rights violations;
2. a blueprint for the establishment of a Peacebuilding Commission to prevent relapses into violence following the conclusion of peace agreements; and
3. agreement on equipping the UN with a new Human Rights Council to strengthen its ability to promote and protect human rights around the world.

— UNA-UK,

World leaders agreed on a compromise text, including the following notable items:

- the creation of a Peacebuilding Commission to provide a central mechanism to help countries emerging from conflict
- an agreement that the international community has a "responsibility to protect"—the duty to intervene when national governments fail to fulfill their responsibility to protect their citizens from atrocious crimes
- a Human Rights Council (established in 2006)
- an agreement to devote more resources to UN's Office of Internal Oversight Services (OIOS)
- several agreements to spend billions more on achieving the Millennium Development Goals
- a clear and unambiguous condemnation of terrorism "in all its forms and manifestations"
- a democracy fund
- an agreement to wind up the Trusteeship Council due to the completion of its mission

=== UN Security Council and the protection of civilians in armed conflicts ===
The United Nations Security Council Resolution 1674, adopted by the United Nations Security Council on 28 April 2006, "reaffirm[ed] the provisions of paragraphs 138 and 139 of the 2005 World Summit Outcome Document regarding the responsibility to protect populations from genocide, war crimes, ethnic cleansing and crimes against humanity" and commits the Security Council to action to protect civilians in armed conflict.
