= Francis Deng =

South Sudanese politician and diplomat (born 1938)

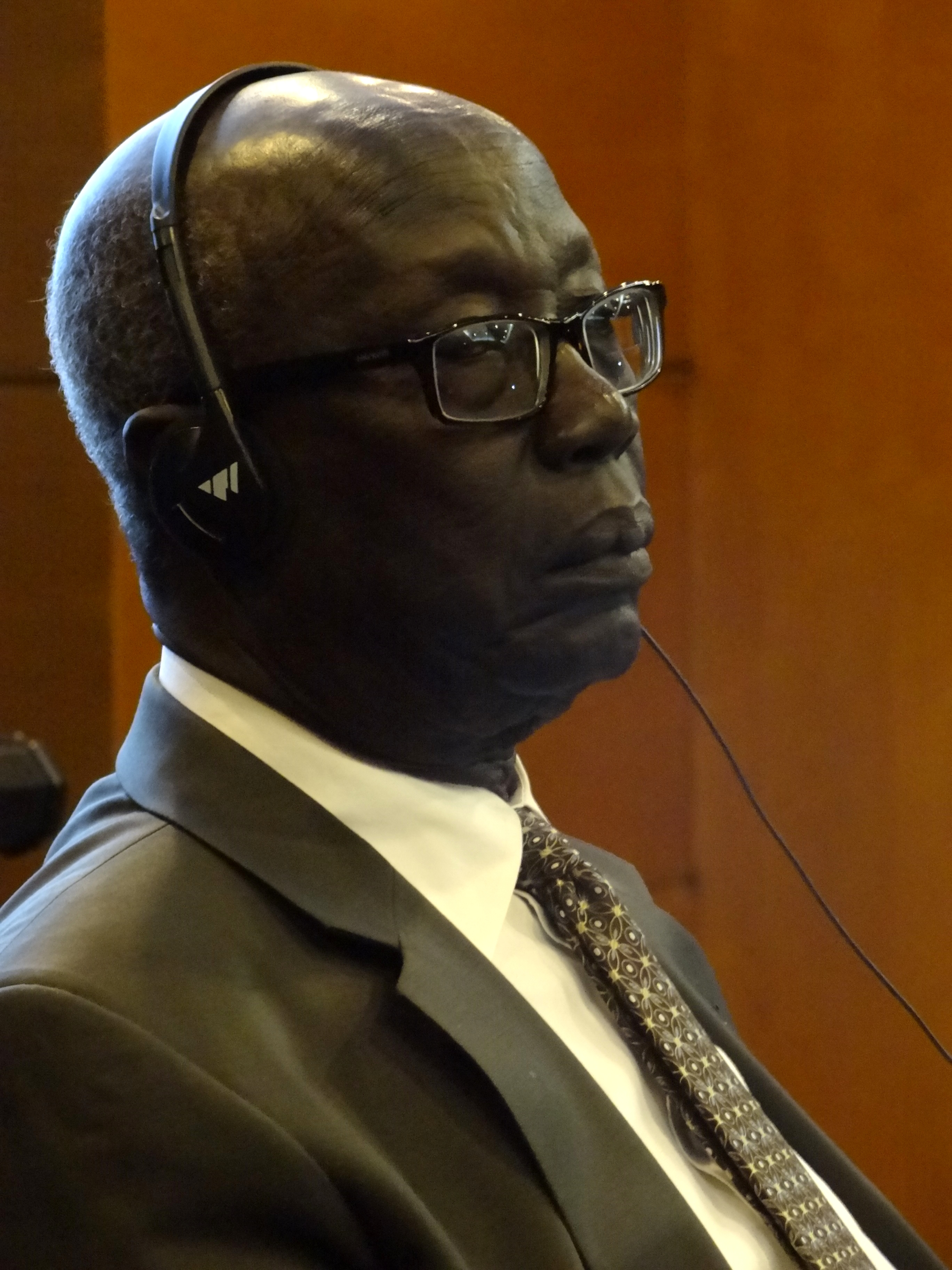
- Deng in 2011
- Born: 1938 (age 87–88) Abyei, Kurdofan, Anglo-Egyptian Sudan
- Occupation: Writer, diplomat, scholar
- Language: English; Arabic; Dinka
- Education: University of Khartoum (LLB, LLM); Yale University (JSD)
- Subject: Law, conflict resolution, human rights, anthropology, history, politics, novels
- Notable awards: 2000 Rome Prize for Peace and Humanitarian Action; 2005 Grawemeyer Award; 2007 Merage Foundation American Dream Leadership Award
- Spouse: Dorothy Anne Ludwig
- Children: 4

Francis Mading Deng (born 1938) is a South Sudanese politician and diplomat. He played an important role in advancing a Responsibility to Protect (R2P) when he was the UN's Special Representative on Internally Displaced Persons (1992–2004).

Educated as a lawyer, Deng was posted as Ambassador of Sudan to the United States, Canada, Denmark, Finland, Norway, and Sweden over the period 1972 to 1976. From 1976 to 1980, he was Sudan's Minister of State for Foreign Affairs. After leaving Sudan's diplomatic service, he held several academic positions before becoming the United Nations' first Special Representative on the Human Rights of Internally Displaced Persons in 1992.

He was the newly independent South Sudan's first ambassador to the United Nations from 2012 to July 2016.

== Early life ==
Francis Mading Deng was born near Abyei, Sudan in 1938. His father was Deng Majok, paramount chief of the Ngok Dinka, the largest tribe in Sudan. Francis was the eldest son of Deng Majok's fourth wife.

Deng studied law at University of Khartoum (Bachelor of Laws) and Master of Laws (LL.M.). He earned a Doctor of Juridical Science (J.S.D.) from Yale University in 1967. He also took graduate courses at King's College London.

== Career ==
Under Sudanese presidents Ismail al-Azhari and Gaafar Nimeiry, Deng served as Human Rights Officer at the United Nations Secretariat (from 1967 to 1972). He went on leave in 1972, spending time as a postdoctoral fellow at Yale University and a lecturer in law at Columbia University.

In 1972, he joined the Sudan diplomatic service, where he was posted as Ambassador of Sudan to the United States, Canada, Denmark, Finland, Norway, and Sweden.

He was Sudan's Minister of State for Foreign Affairs from 1976 to 1980. After leaving his country's service, he was appointed as the first Rockefeller Brothers Fund Distinguished Fellow. He held several academic positions, mainly in the United States.

In the 1980s, Deng served at the Woodrow Wilson International Center first as a guest scholar and then as a senior research associate, after which he joined the Brookings Institution as a senior fellow, where he founded and directed the Africa Project for 12 years. He was then appointed distinguished professor at the Graduate Center of the City University of New York before joining Johns Hopkins University in 2002.

From 1992 to 2004, Deng served as the United Nations' first Special Representative on the Human Rights of Internally Displaced Persons.

In 2005, Deng was named a Distinguished Visiting Scholar at the John W. Kluge Center of the Library of Congress. From 2006 to 2007, Deng served as director of the Sudan Peace Support Project based at the United States Institute of Peace. He also was a Wilhelm Fellow at the Center for International Studies of the Massachusetts Institute of Technology and a research professor of international politics, law and society at the Paul H. Nitze School of Advanced International Studies.

On 29 May 2007, United Nations Secretary-General Ban Ki-moon announced the appointment of Deng as the new Special Advisor for the Prevention of Genocide, a position he held until 17 July 2012 at the level of Under-Secretary General.

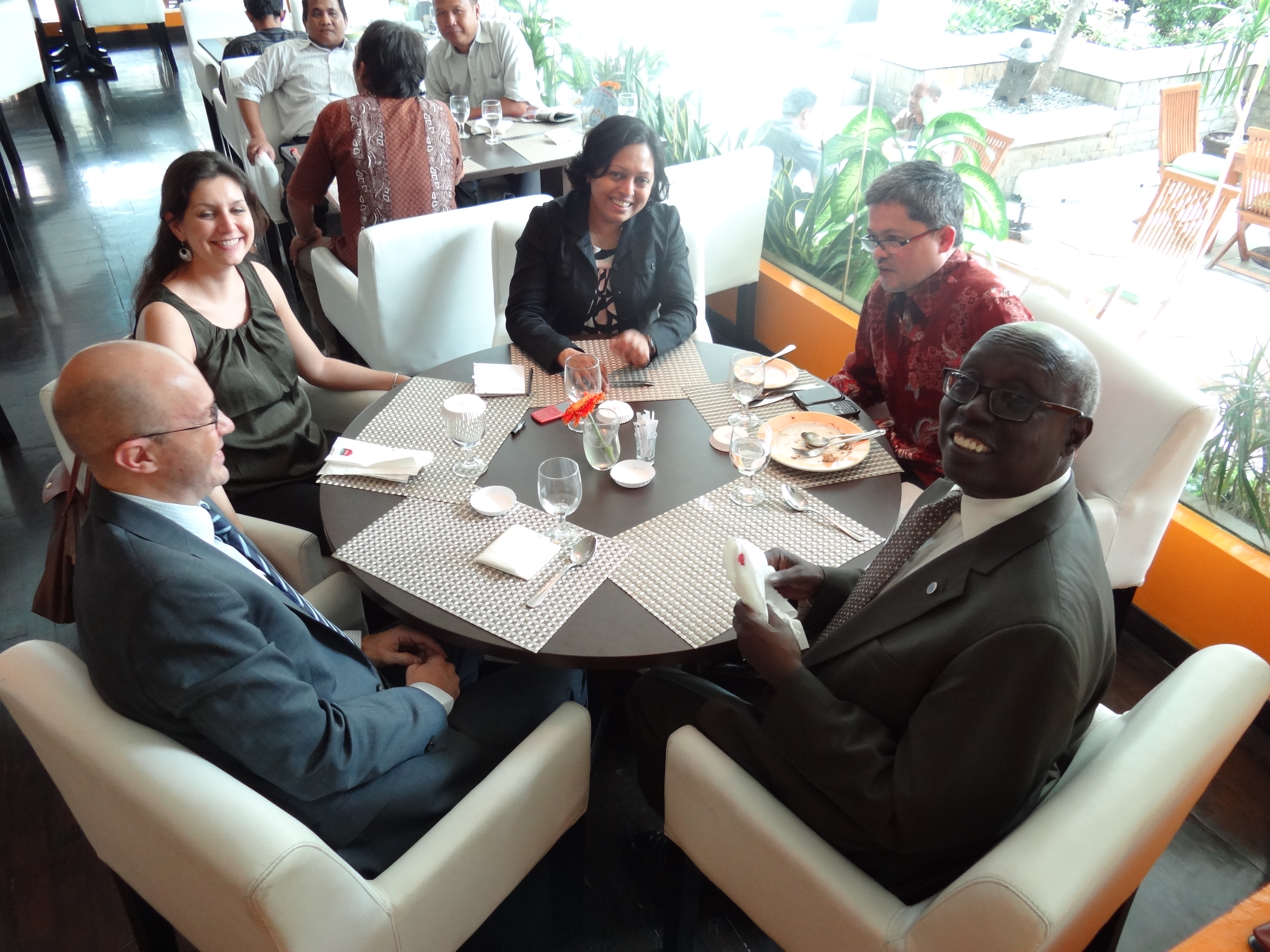
Representatives of UN Office of the Special Adviser on the Prevention of Genocide with Francis Deng, 2011

Among his numerous awards in his country and abroad, Deng is co-recipient with Roberta Cohen of the 2005 Grawemeyer Award for "Ideas Improving World Order" and the 2007 Merage Foundation American Dream Leadership Award. In 2000, Deng also received the Rome Prize for Peace and Humanitarian Action.

From 2012 to July 2016, he served as South Sudan's first Permanent Representative of South Sudan to the United Nations.

Deng is a member of the Crimes Against Humanity Initiative Advisory Council, a project of the Whitney R. Harris World Law Institute at Washington University School of Law in St. Louis to establish the world’s first treaty on the prevention and punishment of crimes against humanity.

He has authored and edited 40 books in the fields of law, conflict resolution, internal displacement, human rights, anthropology, folklore, history and politics and has also written two novels on the theme of the crisis of national identity in Sudan.

== Selected publications ==
- Bound by Conflict: Dilemmas of the Two Sudans (International Humanitarian Affairs. with Kevin M. Cahill M.D. (FUP)) (1 March 2016)
- Identity, Diversity, and Constitutionalism in Africa Now (1, 2008)
- Talking it Out: Stories in Negotiating Human Relations (Kegan Paul, 2006)
- A Strategic Vision for Africa: The Kampala Movement, with I. William Zartman (2002)
- African Reckoning: A Quest for Good Governance, co-editor with Terrence Lyons (1998)
- Masses in Flight: The Global Crisis of Internal Displacement, with Roberta Cohen (1998)
- The Forsaken People: Case Studies of the Internally Displaced, co-editor with Roberta Cohen (1998)
- Seed of Redemption, 1986?
- War of Visions: Conflicting Identities in the Sudan (1995)
- Human Rights in Africa: Cross-Cultural Perspectives, ed. with Abdullahi Ahmed An-Na'im (1990)
- Cry of the Owl (Lilian Barber Press, Inc., 1989)
- Tradition and Modernization: A Challenge for Law Among the Dinka of the Sudan (1987)
- Dinka Folktales: African Stories from the Sudan (June 1984)
- Dinka Cosmology (Sudan studies) (1980)
- Dynamics of identification: a basis for national integration in the Sudan (1973)
- The Dinka and their songs (1973)
- The Dinka of the Sudan (1972, Holt, Rinehart and Winston Inc.; 1984, reissued with changes by Waveland Press Inc.)

== Personal life ==
He married Dorothy Ann Ludwig in 1972 in the Church Center for the United Nations. Francis's son Daniel Deng operates a non-profit, KUSH, in South Sudan.
