= Nautilus Data Technologies =

Nautilus Data Technologies, based in Pleasanton, California, is an American company developing floating data centers. It was founded by U.S. Navy veteran Arnold Magcale. As of 2016, the CEO is James L. Connaughton. The floating data center concept, also called a data barge, is being developed at the former Mare Island Naval Shipyard in association with elements of the U.S. Navy including SPAWAR. The company plans to operate a 235-foot (72 m) barge in the Stockton Deep Water Channel, circulating water on board to cool equipment and returning it to the source 4 °F (2.2 °C) hotter.

== See also ==
- Google barges
