= Editorial board at The Wall Street Journal =

The editorial board at The Wall Street Journal writes opinion articles in The Wall Street Journal and selects opinion articles by outside parties for publication. The editorial board is known for its conservative positions, which at times bring it into conflict with the Journal's news division.

The Wall Street Journal editorial board members oversee the Journal's editorial page, dictating the opinion section's tone and direction.

Every Saturday and Sunday, three editorial page writers and host Paul Gigot, editor of the Editorial Page, appear on Fox News Channel's Journal Editorial Report to discuss current issues with a variety of guests. As editors of the editorial page, Vermont C. Royster (served 1958–1971) and Robert L. Bartley (served 1972–2000) were especially influential in providing a conservative interpretation of the news on a daily basis.

== History ==
The Journal describes the history of its editorials:

We speak for free markets and free people, the principles, if you will, marked in the watershed year of 1776 by Thomas Jefferson's Declaration of Independence and Adam Smith's The Wealth of Nations. So over the past century and into the next, the Journal stands for free trade and sound money; against confiscatory taxation and the ukases of kings and other collectivists; and for individual autonomy against dictators, bullies and even the tempers of momentary majorities.

— WSJ Editorial Board

Its historical position was much the same. As former editor William H. Grimes wrote in 1951:

On our editorial page we make no pretense of walking down the middle of the road. Our comments and interpretations are made from a definite point of view. We believe in the individual, in his wisdom and his decency. We oppose all infringements on individual rights, whether they stem from attempts at private monopoly, labor union monopoly or from an overgrowing government. People will say we are conservative or even reactionary. We are not much interested in labels but if we were to choose one, we would say we are radical. Just as radical as the Christian doctrine.

Each Thanksgiving, the editorial page reprints two articles that have appeared there since 1961. The first is The Desolate Wilderness, which describes what the Pilgrims saw when they arrived at Plymouth Colony. The second is And the Fair Land, which describes the bounty of America. It was written by a former editor, Vermont C. Royster, whose Christmas article In Hoc Anno Domini has appeared every December 25 since 1949.

Contrasts have been noted between the Journal's news reporting and its editorial pages. "While Journal reporters keep busy informing readers", one reporter wrote in 1982, "Journal editorial writers put forth views that often contradict the paper's best reporting and news analysis." Two summaries, published in 1995 by the progressive blog Fairness and Accuracy in Reporting and in 1996 by the Columbia Journalism Review, criticized the Journal's editorial page for inaccuracy during the 1980s and 1990s. In 2011, one reference work called the editorial pages "rigidly neoconservative" while noting that the news coverage "has enjoyed a sterling reputation among readers of all political stripes".

When Rupert Murdoch bought the Journal from the Bancroft family he promised Paul Steiger, "What is on the Opinion pages will never be allowed to flow into the news pages" and "The two must be kept distinct and while I sometimes find myself nodding in agreement with the comment and commentators, even I occasionally find the views a little too far to the right."

In 2016 the environmental business group Partnership for Responsible Growth took out ads in the opinion section that criticized the Board's position on climate change.

The candidacy and presidency of Donald Trump have split the editorial board and further separated the Board from the Journal's news department. As a result of the conflict, some staff, including Bret Stephens, Bari Weiss, Robert Messenger, and Sohrab Ahmari, left the WSJ. After first backing Ted Cruz the board shifted its support to Trump; according to editors who left the board this shift was due to Murdoch's realizing that Trump could win the election.

In July 2020, more than 280 Journal journalists and Dow Jones staff members wrote a letter to new publisher Almar Latour to criticize the opinion pages' "lack of fact-checking and transparency, and its apparent disregard for evidence", adding, "opinion articles often make assertions that are contradicted by WSJ reporting." Among the pieces criticized in the letter was one by Mike Pence titled "There Isn't a Coronavirus 'Second Wave.'" The editorial board responded that its opinion pages "won't wilt under cancel-culture pressure" and that the editorial content aims to be independent of the news content and offer alternative views to "the uniform progressive views that dominate nearly all of today's media." The board's response did not address the fact-checking issues the letter raised.

== Positions and views ==
=== Economic views ===
During the Reagan administration, the editorial page was particularly influential as the leading voice for supply-side economics. Under the editorship of Robert L. Bartley, it expounded at length on economic concepts such as the Laffer curve, and how a decrease in certain marginal tax rates and the capital gains tax could allegedly increase overall tax revenue by generating more economic activity.

In the economic argument of exchange rate regimes (one of the most divisive issues among economists), the Journal has a tendency to support fixed exchange rates over floating exchange rates.

=== Political stance ===
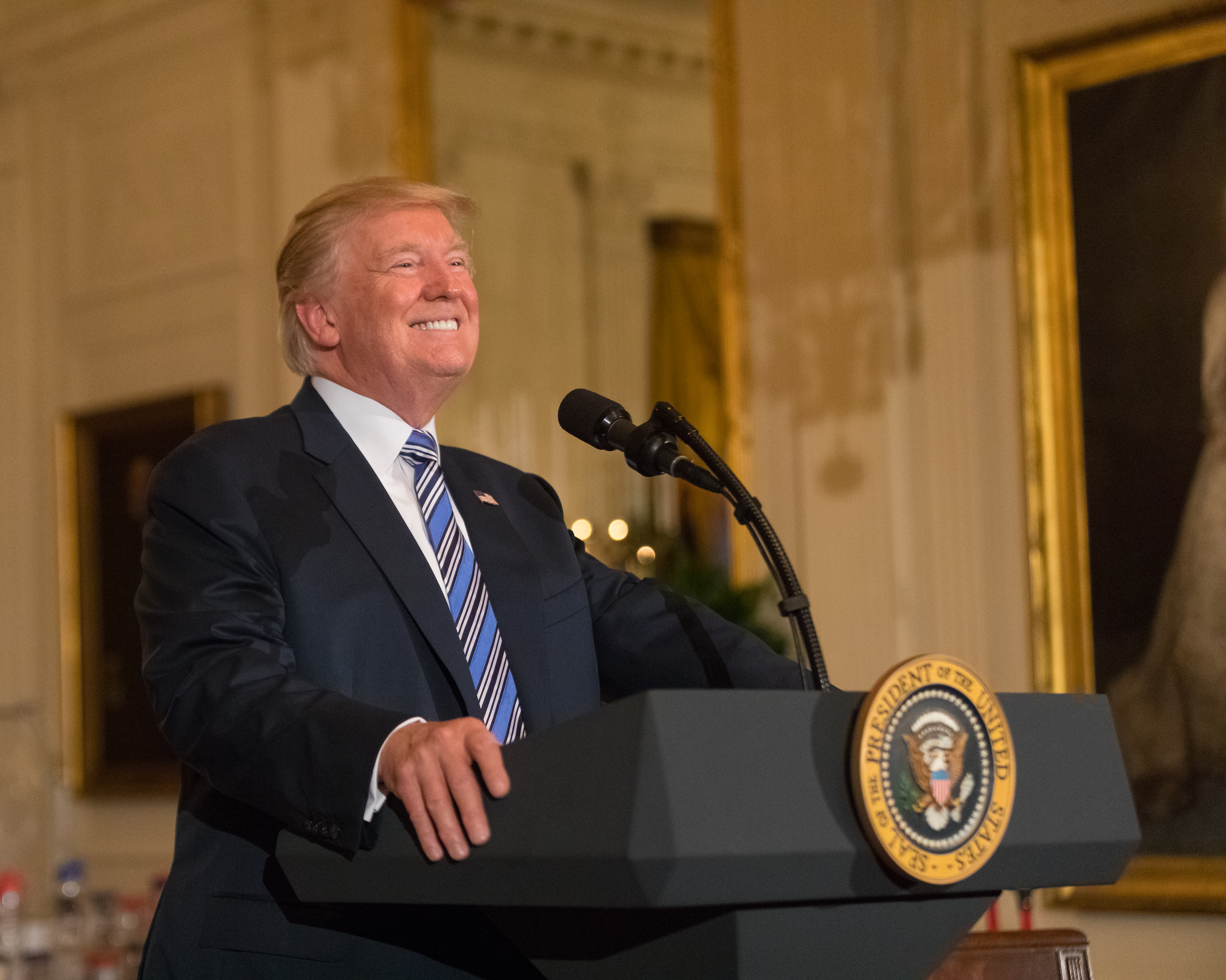
Donald Trump

The Journal's editorial pages and columns, run separately from the news pages, have a conservative bent and are highly influential in establishment conservative circles. Despite this, the Journal refrains from endorsing candidates and has not endorsed a candidate since 1928. Some of the Journal's former reporters claim that the paper has adopted a more conservative tone since Rupert Murdoch's purchase.

In a July 3, 1984, the editorial board wrote: "If Washington still wants to 'do something' about immigration, we propose a five-word constitutional amendment: There shall be open borders." The Journal's support for the Comprehensive Immigration Reform Act of 2007 broke with conservative publications such as National Review. In June 2025, the board criticized the Trump Administration's stance on restricting student visas. In September 2025, the board called the administration's mass deportation campaign "excessive" and said it violated due process, but supported the Supreme Court's decision to allow ICE agents to use race as a factor in detaining people.

The Journal's editorial page has been seen as critical of many aspects of Barack Obama's presidency. In particular, it has been a prominent critic of the Affordable Care Act legislation passed in 2010, and has featured many opinion columns attacking various aspects of the bill. The Journal's editorial page has also criticized the Obama administration's energy policies and foreign policy.

On October 25, 2017, the editorial board called for Special Counsel Robert Mueller to resign from the investigation into Russian interference in the 2016 United States elections and accused Hillary Clinton's 2016 presidential campaign of colluding with Russia. In December 2017, the editorial board repeated its calls for Mueller's resignation. The Board criticized Mueller's handling of Peter Strzok and questioned Mueller's credibility. A piece published by the Board from a contributor claimed that the investigation would "imperil the rule of law". The editorials by the editorial board caused fractures within The Wall Street Journal, as reporters said that the editorials undermined the paper's credibility.

In October 2021, the editorial board let former president Donald Trump publish a letter in the editorial pages of the paper. News sources described the contents of the letter as false and debunked claims about the 2020 presidential election. The decision to publish the letter was poorly received by many on the Journal's news side. In response to criticism of the Journal's decision to publish the letter, the editorial board said the criticism was "cancel-culture pressure".

In 2022, an editorial called a story told by President Joe Biden about a 10-year-old Ohio girl who was forced to cross state lines to obtain an abortion following a rape "fanciful" and an "unlikely story". The piece also accused the girl's obstetrician-gynecologist of having a "long history of abortion activism in the media". Following confirmation that the story was true, a note was added to the editorial.

Political scientist Omar Shahabudin McDoom has cited the editorial board's work as an example of Gaza genocide denial.

=== Science ===
The Journal editorial pages were described as a "forum for climate change denial" in 2011 due to columns that attacked climate scientists and accused them of engaging in fraud. A 2011 study found that the Journal was alone among major American print news media in how, mainly in its editorial pages, it adopted a false balance that overplayed the uncertainty in climate science or denied anthropogenic climate change altogether. In 2013, the editorial board and other opinion writers vocally criticized President Obama's plan to address climate change, mostly without mentioning climate science. A 2015 study found The Wall Street Journal was the newspaper least likely of several to present negative effects of global warming. It was also the most likely to present negative economic framing when discussing climate change mitigation policies, tending to take the stance that such policies' costs generally outweigh their benefits. Climate Feedback, a fact-checking website on media coverage of climate science, determined that multiple opinion articles range between "low" and "very low" in terms of scientific credibility.

In the 1980s and 1990s, the Journal published numerous opinion columns opposing and misrepresenting the scientific consensus on the harms of second-hand smoke, acid rain, and ozone depletion, in addition to public policy efforts to curb pesticides and asbestos. The Journal later recognized that efforts to curb acid rain through cap-and-trade had been successful, a decade after the Clean Air Act Amendments.

== Board members ==
- Paul Gigot (editor-in-chief)
- James Freeman (assistant editor)
- Daniel Henninger
- Dorothy Rabinowitz
- Jason L. Riley
- Peggy Noonan
- Kimberley Strassel
- William McGurn
- Mary O'Grady
- Allysia Finley
- Joseph Sternberg
- Kyle Peterson
- Kate Bachelder Odell

=== Former ===
- Bret Stephens
- Joseph Rago
- Mary Kissel
- Claudia Rosett
- Joe Morgenstern
- Mark Lasswell
- Manuela Hoelterhoff
- Robert L. Bartley
- Robert Messenger
- Robert L. Pollock
- Vermont C. Royster

== Awards ==
The Journal won its first two Pulitzer Prizes for editorial writing in 1947 and 1953.

In 1980 Robert L. Bartley was awarded the Pulitzer Prize for editorial writing.

In 1983 Manuela Hoelterhoff was awarded the Pulitzer Prize for criticism for her "wide-ranging criticism on the arts and other subjects."

In 1984 Vermont Royster was awarded the Pulitzer Prize for commentary.

In 2000 Paul Gigot's column "Potomac Watch" won the Pulitzer Prize for commentary.

In 2001 Dorothy Rabinowitz was awarded the Pulitzer Prize for commentary for "articles on American society and culture."

In 2005 Joe Morgenstern was awarded the Pulitzer Prize for criticism for "reviews that elucidated the strengths and weaknesses of film with rare insight, authority and wit."

In 2006 Robert Pollock won the Gerald Loeb Award for commentary.

In 2011 Joseph Rago was awarded the Pulitzer Prize for editorial writing.

In 2013 Bret Stephens was awarded the Pulitzer Prize for commentary for "incisive columns on American foreign policy and domestic politics, often enlivened by a contrarian twist."

In 2017 Peggy Noonan was awarded the Pulitzer Prize for commentary "For rising to the moment with beautifully rendered columns that connected readers to the shared virtues of Americans during one of the nation's most divisive political campaigns."

== See also ==
- Brian Carney (editorialist)
- Holman W. Jenkins Jr
- Stephen Moore (writer)
- Mary O'Grady
- Nancy deWolf Smith
- Kimberley A. Strassel
- Amity Shlaes
