= Environmental Quality Improvement Act =

United States environmental law

Environmental Quality Improvement Act of 1970
- Long title: Environmental Quality Improvement Act of 1970
- Enacted by: the 91st United States Congress
- Effective: April 3rd. 1970

Citations
- Public law: Pub. L. 91–224
- Statutes at Large: 84 Stat. 91

Codification
- U.S.C. sections created: 42 U.S.C. 4371-4374

The Environmental Quality Improvement Act of 1970 is a United States environmental law which was passed to work in conjunction with the National Environmental Policy Act of 1969 (NEPA). One of the two major purposes of the Act was to authorize the creation of an Office of Environmental Quality to provide the professional and administrative staff needed for the Council on Environmental Quality. The second major purpose was to "assure that each Federal department and agency conducting or supporting public works activities which affect the environment shall implement the policies under existing law". To accomplish these purposes, the act gave more responsibilities to the chairman of the Council on Environmental Quality in his new role as director of the Office of Environmental Quality.

== Legislative history ==
The Environmental Quality Improvement Act of 1970 started out as H.R. 4148 in the U.S. House of Representatives Public Works Committee in April 1970. It was taken up by the U.S. Senate Public Works Committee in October 1969 and went to a joint conference between the houses in March 1969. The bill passed the Senate with a vote of 80 to 0 on March 24 and the House on March 25 with a vote of 358 to 0. The lack of any nay votes shows there was broad support for the passage of this bill.

The bill also had six amendments from the years 1973 to 1984 but the amendments mostly dealt with providing additional funding in various years over the amount specified by NEPA. The amounts ranged from a low of an additional $44,000.00/year for 1982–1984 to a high of $3,000,000/year additional funds for 1980 and 1981. Besides providing additional funds, Pub. L. 98-581 (10-30-1984) amended the Environmental Quality Improvement Act to create a fund called the Office of Environmental Quality Management Fund (42 US Code 4375(a)). The fund was established to finance study contracts that are sponsored by both the OEQ and at least one other Federal agency. The fund can also fund Federal Interagency environmental projects such as a task force that the OEQ is participating in. The fund is allowed to receive advance payments from other agencies to finance the proposed study, project or activity.

== Major provisions ==
In Section 4372 (a), (b), and (c) of the act, the Office of Environmental Quality (OEQ) is established as an office within the Executive Office of the President of the United States with the chairman of the Council on Environmental Quality (CEQ) as the director of the OEQ. In addition, the president of the United States also picks a deputy director for the OEQ who is also to be approved by the Senate. While the director is allowed to employ the number of people he may need to carry out the work of the OEQ, he is limited to hiring only ten specialists or experts. These specialists or experts also cannot be paid more than a GS-18 pay scale. The function of the OEQ is to provide support for the CEQ and to help the director carry out his new duties as given in Section 4372 (d). The OEQ and the CEQ are simply known jointly as the Council on Environmental Quality and there is not a separate listing for the OEQ within the Office of the President or a separate website from the CEQ.

Another major area in the Environmental Quality Improvement Act was the creation of six new duties or functions given to the director of OEQ. Besides the director fulfilling the duties to the President of the United States and the CEQ under NEPA, the director had to make sure that the following provisions of U.S. Code 4372 (d) 2-7 were carried out as well:.

4372 (d ) 2: assisting the Federal agencies and departments in appraising the effectiveness of existing and proposed facilities, programs, policies, and activities of the Federal Government, and those specific major projects designated by the president which do not require individual project authorization by Congress, which affect environmental quality;

4372 (d) 3: reviewing the adequacy of existing systems for monitoring and predicting environmental changes in order to achieve effective coverage and efficient use of research facilities and other resources;

4372 (d) 4: promoting the advancement of scientific knowledge of the effects of actions and technology on the environment and encourage the development of the means to prevent or reduce adverse effects that endanger the health and well-being of man;

4372 (d) 5: assisting in coordinating among the Federal departments and agencies those programs and activities which affect, protect, and improve environmental quality;

4372 (d) 6: assisting the Federal departments and agencies in the development and interrelationship of environmental quality criteria and standards established through the Federal Government;

and 4372 (d) 7: collecting, collating, analyzing, and interpreting data and information on environmental quality, ecological research, and evaluation.

The last major provision is that the annual Environmental Quality Report required by NEPA (Public Law 91-190) will be sent to each standing committee that has jurisdiction over any part that might be contained in the report. The Environmental Quality Report, as described in NEPA, relates the status and condition of air, aquatic, and terrestrial environments, future and current trends in regards to those environments, how adequate those resources are for providing our economic needs, a review of significant activities all levels of governments, other entities, and individuals are doing in the area of conservation, effect on the environment, and in developing natural resources, and also how existing programs that are lacking will be improved along with recommendations for legislation. The preparation of this report would be an example of one of the duties from NEPA that the director of the OEQ would be responsible for as well.

== Impact ==
As part of the duties given to the director by this act, the staff of the OEQ works on many guidances and notices that assist federal agencies and entities with implementing policy on environmental issues. Some recent examples are:

Final Guidance on Improving the Process for Preparing Efficient and Timely Environmental Reviews Under the National Environmental Policy Act – the guidance goes over crucial techniques that agencies are not fully employing in preparing environmental reviews. These environmental reviews (environmental impact assessments and environmental assessments) are important in understanding the environmental impact and what can be done to mitigate it.

Final Guidance, "Federal Greenhouse Gas Accounting and Reporting" – This is the final notice to agencies to help them comply with an annual accounting for Greenhouse Gases as required by Executive Order #13514. The purpose of the annual accounting is to gauge over a number of years if an agency's reduction plan for greenhouse gases is effective. It also notes there will be revisions to this guidance as better techniques are created.

Instructions for Implementing Sustainable Locations for Federal Facilities in Accordance With Executive Order 13514 – This gives agencies directions on how to incorporate principles of sustainable locations into the decision making process for where a building should be built or leased. A building that fits in with future regional transportation plans, is near public transport, and is in a pedestrian friendly area would have a more sustainable location.

As noted in Section 4374 (d)5, one of the duties of the director and OEQ is assisting with other agencies in activities that will help improve, protect, and affect environmental quality. An example of this is the chair of the Council on Environmental Quality, Nancy Sutley (the director of OEQ as well), chaired an Interagency Ocean Policy Task Force that among other things looked into effective coastal and marine spatial planning. Another employee of the OEQ also served on the steering committee of this task force to help coordinate its activities.

== See also ==
- 1970 in the environment
- United States energy law
