= Paul O'Reilly =

Paul O'Reilly may refer to:

- Paul O'Reilly (cricketer) (born 1962), English cricketer
- Paul J. O'Reilly, American scholar and academic, president of Thomas Aquinas College

== See also ==
- Paul Reilly (disambiguation)
