= Katie McGinty =

American politician and official (born 1963)

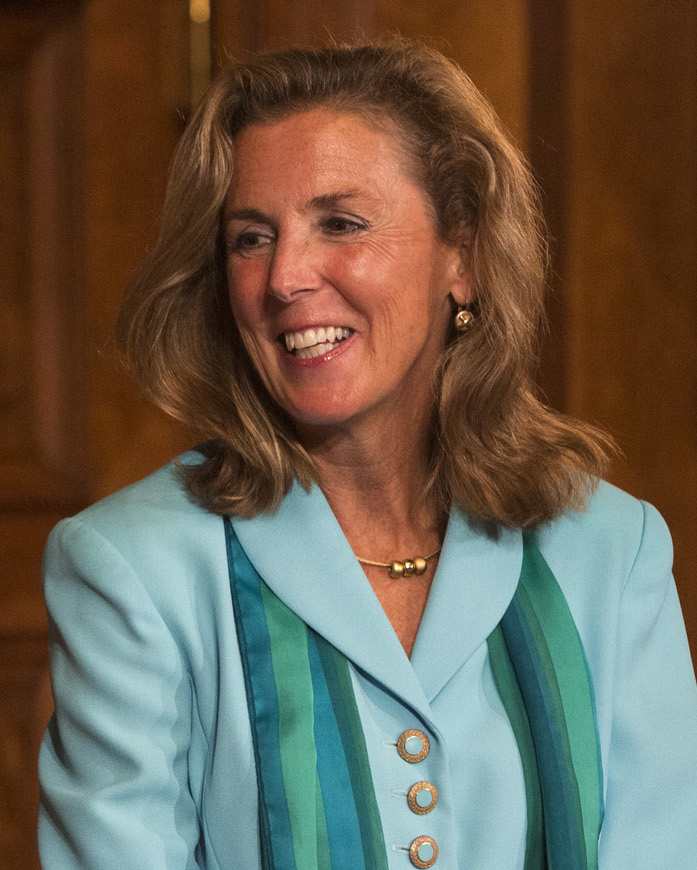

Chief of Staff to the Governor of Pennsylvania
- In office January 20, 2015 – July 23, 2015
- Governor: Tom Wolf
- Preceded by: Leslie Gromis-Baker
- Succeeded by: Mary Isenhour

Pennsylvania Secretary of Environmental Protection
- In office January 2003 – July 2008
- Governor: Ed Rendell
- Preceded by: David Hess
- Succeeded by: John Hanger

Chair of the Council on Environmental Quality
- In office January 20, 1993 – November 7, 1998 (Note: McGinty was appointed as director of a new White House Office on Environmental Policy intended to replace CEQ, before Clinton later merged that office back into CEQ, with McGinty formally nominated and confirmed as chair on January 5, 1995.)
- President: Bill Clinton
- Preceded by: Michael Deland
- Succeeded by: George Frampton

Personal details
- Born: Kathleen Alana McGinty; May 11, 1963 (age 63) Philadelphia, Pennsylvania, U.S.
- Party: Democratic
- Spouse: Karl Hausker
- Education: St. Joseph's University (BS); Columbia University (JD)
- Website: Campaign website

Kathleen Alana McGinty (born May 11, 1963) is an American politician and former state and federal environmental policy official. She served as an environmental advisor to Vice President Al Gore and President Bill Clinton. Later, she served as Secretary of the Pennsylvania Department of Environmental Protection in the cabinet of Governor Ed Rendell.

Prior to the nomination of Lisa P. Jackson, she was mentioned as a possible United States Environmental Protection Agency Administrator under President Barack Obama, as well as a possible candidate to succeed Ed Rendell as Governor of Pennsylvania, but was not a candidate in the 2010 election. McGinty was an unsuccessful candidate for the governorship in 2014. After Democrat Tom Wolf won Pennsylvania's 2014 gubernatorial election, he appointed McGinty as his chief of staff.

On August 4, 2015, she officially announced her candidacy for the United States Senate in 2016. McGinty won the Democratic nomination on April 26, 2016, but lost in a close election, with 47.3% of the vote, to incumbent Republican Senator Pat Toomey, who garnered 48.7% in the general election. McGinty served as the Senior Vice President of the Oceans Program for the Environmental Defense Fund. In June 2019, she became the vice president of global government relations for Johnson Controls.

== Early life and education ==
McGinty grew up in Northeast Philadelphia. She graduated from St. Hubert Catholic High School for Girls, Saint Joseph's University in 1985 (with a BS in chemistry), and Columbia Law School in 1988 (with a JD). She earned a Judicial Clerkship appointment to the Court of Appeals for the Federal Circuit in Washington upon graduating from Columbia.

== Career ==
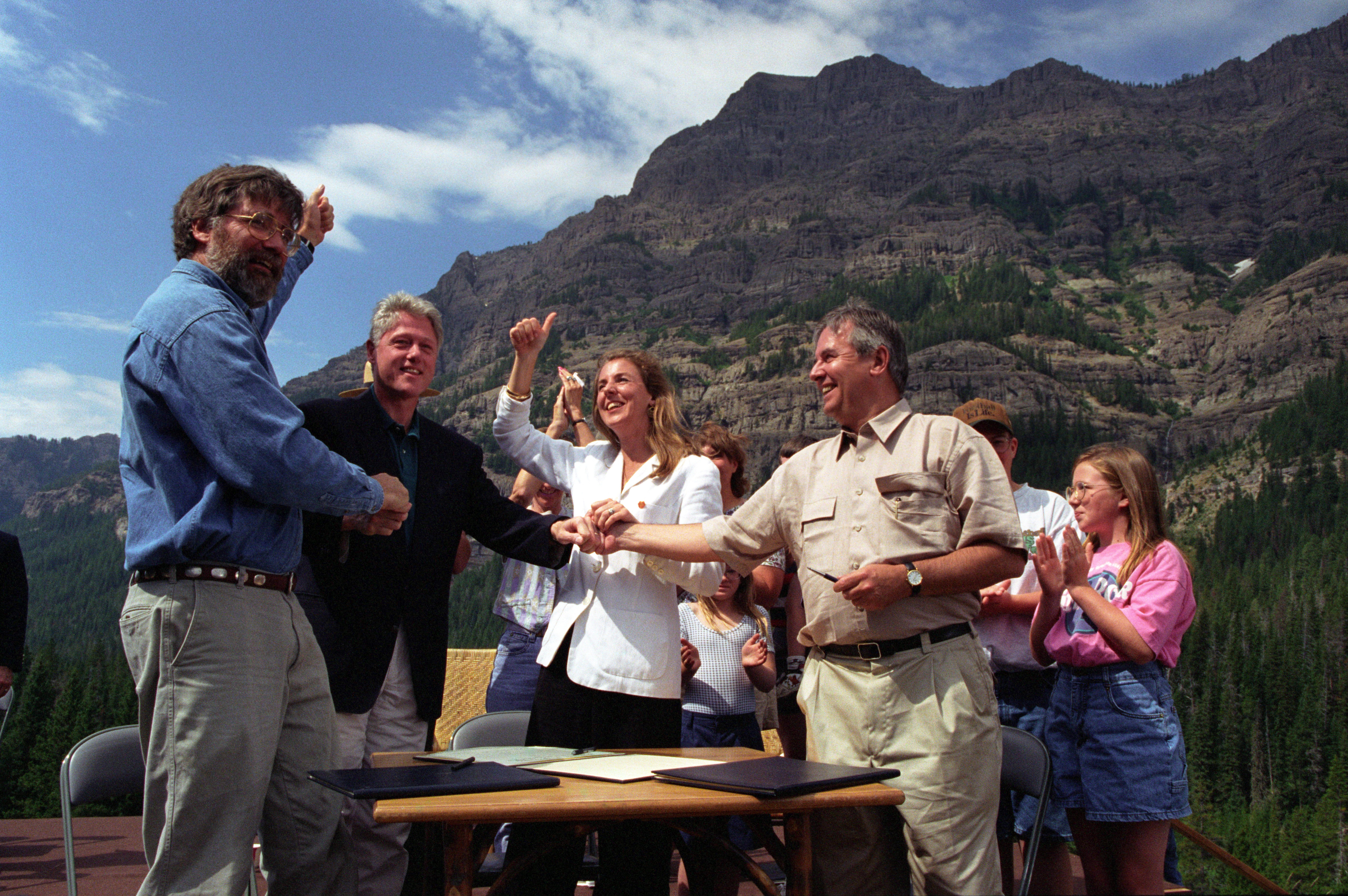
McGinty celebrates the signing of the World Mine Property Agreement with President Bill Clinton, Mike Finley, and Ian Mayer in 1996

After law school, McGinty clerked for a federal judge but did not ultimately take the bar exam or practice law. She won a Congressional Fellowship after crafting a strategy to bring technology jobs back to the United States and became a legislative assistant to Al Gore when he was serving as a U.S. Senator from Tennessee. In 1993, she became a deputy assistant to President Bill Clinton. She chaired the White House Council on Environmental Quality from 1995 to 1998. She moved to India in 1999 where she worked at the Tata Energy Research Institute, forging new partnerships between US and Indian clean energy companies to help address climate change, an effort that supported the negotiation of new environmental agreements between the US and India.

In 2003 she was appointed as the secretary of Pennsylvania's Department of Environmental Protection, serving in Pennsylvania Governor Ed Rendell's administration for over five years.

In the private sector, McGinty led a business cleaning up and redeveloping "brownfield properties" and developing renewable energy projects. As an Operating Partner with a private equity fund, she helped build successful growth strategies for mid-stage clean energy, water, and efficiency companies. She also started her own small company, and has been a Director on public and private company boards. Specifically, McGinty served as Chair of the Audit Committee of Iberdrola USA, as Chair of the Nuclear Subcommittee of the Board of NRGEnergy, and as member of the boards of Weston Solutions, ECORE International Inc., Thar Energy, and Proton Energy Systems. McGinty also served on the Advisory Boards of early stage companies including Petra Solar, AE Polysilicon, Plextronics and GridPoint.

McGinty currently serves on the boards of the Energy Futures Initiative, the Committee of Seventy, and the American Sustainable Business Council.

== Political campaigns ==
=== 2014 Pennsylvania gubernatorial campaign ===
On April 12, 2013, McGinty announced she would be a candidate for Governor of Pennsylvania in 2014. McGinty finished fourth in the primary behind Allyson Schwartz, Rob McCord, and eventual general election winner Tom Wolf, who appointed her his chief of staff. She served in that capacity from January 2015 until July 2015, amid speculation that she was considering running for the United States Senate in the 2016 election.

=== 2016 U.S. Senate campaign ===
On August 4, 2015, McGinty officially announced her candidacy for the United States Senate in 2016. She was endorsed by EMILY's List, Pennsylvania Governor Tom Wolf, former Pennsylvania Governor Ed Rendell, and President Barack Obama.

In April 2016, she defeated former U.S. Representative Joe Sestak and then-Mayor of Braddock John Fetterman in the Democratic primary. As of June 30, 2016, financial disclosures showed that McGinty's campaign had spent $4,312,688 and raised $6,713,202.

The Senate election between McGinty and incumbent Republican Pat Toomey was among the most expensive Senate races in America. According to the nonpartisan OpenSecrets, as of October 2016, more than $52 million had been spent on the general and primary election between the two candidates. During the race, McGinty was attacked for awarding state grants to a group where her husband was a consultant when she was on a state Ethics Committee. Due to this and her wealth, several attack ads labeled her "Shady Katie."

In the general election on November 8, 2016, she was defeated by Toomey by the margin of 86,000 votes. McGinty received 47.34% of the vote.

== Personal life ==
McGinty is married to Karl Hausker. They have three daughters and reside in Wayne, Pennsylvania.

== Electoral history ==
2014 Pennsylvania Gubernatorial Democratic primary
| Party | Candidate | Votes | % |
|---|---|---|---|
| Democratic | Tom Wolf | 488,917 | 57.86 |
| Democratic | Allyson Schwartz | 149,027 | 17.64 |
| Democratic | Robert McCord | 142,311 | 16.84 |
| Democratic | Katie McGinty | 64,754 | 7.66 |
| Total votes | | 845,009 | 100 |

2016 United States Senate Democratic primary in Pennsylvania
| Party | Candidate | Votes | % |
|---|---|---|---|
| Democratic | Katie McGinty | 669,774 | 42.50 |
| Democratic | Joe Sestak | 513,221 | 32.57 |
| Democratic | John Fetterman | 307,090 | 19.49 |
| Democratic | Joseph Vodvarka | 85,837 | 5.45 |
| Total votes | | 1,575,922 | 100.00 |

United States Senate election in Pennsylvania, 2016
| Party | Candidate | Votes | % | ±% |
|---|---|---|---|---|
| Republican | Pat Toomey (inc.) | 2,951,702 | 48.77% | |
| Democratic | Katie McGinty | 2,865,012 | 47.34% | |
| Libertarian | Edward T. Clifford III | 235,142 | 3.89% | |
| Total votes | | 6,051,856 | 100.00% | |
| Republican hold | | Swing | NA | |

Political offices
| Preceded by Michael Deland | Chair of the Council on Environmental Quality; 1995–1998 | Succeeded by George T. Frampton Jr. |
Party political offices
| Preceded by Joe Sestak | Democratic nominee for U.S. Senator from Pennsylvania (Class 3); 2016 | Succeeded by John Fetterman |
