= George T. Frampton =

American lawyer (born 1944)

George Frampton
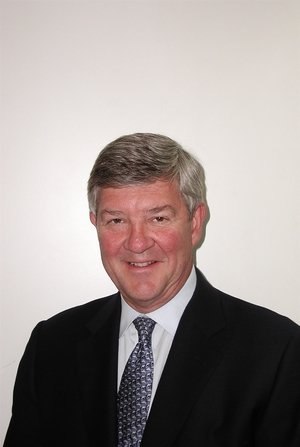

Chair of the Council on Environmental Quality
- In office February 23, 1999 – January 20, 2001
- President: Bill Clinton
- Preceded by: Katie McGinty
- Succeeded by: James L. Connaughton

Personal details
- Born: George Thomas Frampton Jr. August 24, 1944 (age 81) Washington, D.C., U.S.
- Party: Democratic
- Spouse: Carla D'Arista
- Children: 2
- Education: Yale University (BA); London School of Economics (MSc); Harvard University (JD)

George Thomas Frampton Jr. (born August 24, 1944) is an American attorney, environmentalist, and government official who served as Chair of the Council on Environmental Quality. He is currently a co-founder of an environmental advocacy non-profit, Partnership for Responsible Growth. He cowrote a book on Watergate and has authored newspaper columns on subjects including environmental issues and ballot access for independent candidates.

Frampton was an assistant special prosecutor during the Watergate investigation and later accused Robert Bork of making misleading and untenable statements about his role during the Nixon administration and Watergate Scandal in 1987 when Bork was a nominee for a seat on the U.S. Supreme Court. He was Assistant Secretary for Fish and Wildlife and Parks from December 10, 1993, to October 10, 1996, and served as president of the Wilderness Society from 1989 to 1993.

== Early life and education ==
The son of a legal scholar, Frampton was born in Washington, D.C., and grew up in White Plains, New York, Belmont, Massachusetts, and Urbana, Illinois. He graduated from University High School in 1961, and graduated from Yale College with a BA in physics and philosophy in 1965. He then earned an M.Sc. in Economics from the London School of Economics, specializing in advanced economic theory. In 1969, he graduated from Harvard Law School, where he was the treasurer of the Harvard Law Review.

== Career ==
After Harvard, Frampton served as a lawyer for VISTA in New York and then as a consultant on a Middle East peace project under the auspices of the American Friends Service Committee, the Ford Foundation, and Professor Roger Fisher of Harvard Law School. In 1971 he became a law clerk to Supreme Court of the United States Justice Harry A. Blackmun, where he was involved in Blackmun's opinions in Roe v. Wade among others. Frampton served, from 1973 to 1975, as an assistant special prosecutor on the Watergate Special Prosecution Force at the U.S. Department of Justice. In that position, he worked on the grand jury investigation and trial of President Richard M. Nixon’s top aides in the Watergate cover-up. He and a colleague, Richard Ben-Veniste, co-authored Stonewall: The real story of the Watergate prosecution (1977).

Frampton subsequently served as special counsel to the State of Alaska in an investigation of Governor Bill Sheffield and his chief of staff; as an assistant independent counsel to Independent Counsel Jacob A. Stein in the investigation of U.S. Attorney General Edwin Meese; and deputy director and chief of staff for the Nuclear Regulatory Commission’s Special Inquiry Group that conducted the agency's investigation into the Three Mile Island accident. From 1978 until 1985, Frampton was a partner at the Washington, D.C., law firm Rogovin, Huge & Lenzner, focusing on complex and public interest litigation. He served as counsel to independent presidential candidate John B. Anderson in 1980 in a litigation campaign that succeeded in getting Anderson on the ballot in all 50 states.

In 1986, Frampton was named president of The Wilderness Society. He served in that capacity until 1993 when he was nominated by President Clinton to be Assistant Secretary at the U.S. Department of the Interior for fish, wildlife and parks. Frampton was engaged in a range of issues, including Everglades restoration, the regional plan for preservation of Old Growth Forests, wolf reintroduction, and the development of the first multi-species habitat conservation plans under the Endangered Species Act of 1973. He was the lead federal trustee on the Exxon Valdez Oil Trustee Council and helped develop a strategy with Governor Wally Hickel of Alaska to spend more than half the fund purchasing Native corporation lands and bringing them into the federal and state conservation systems. In 1997, he resigned as Assistant Secretary.

In 1997, as Clinton's second term was beginning, Frampton represented Vice President Al Gore as his personal counsel in the preliminary investigation into Gore's fundraising activities, and served as corporate advisor to the EarthSat. Within a year, President Clinton had named Frampton the Chair of the Council on Environmental Quality, and he served in that position until Clinton's departure in January 2001.

After leaving public service, Frampton moved to New York City and was a partner at Boies Schiller Flexner LLP until 2009, also working as operating advisor to Pegasus Capital Advisors. From 2009 to 2014, Frampton was senior of counsel at Covington & Burling in the firm's climate and clean energy practice.

Frampton is a co-founder of the Partnership for Responsible Growth, a non-profit, along with former Congressman Walt Minnick and former Ambassador William Eacho. In 2017, the Partnership for Responsible Growth advocated for a carbon tax in a series of advertisements.

== Personal life ==
Frampton is married to Carla D'Arista and lives in Washington, D.C., Aspen, Colorado and Old Lyme, Connecticut. Previously, he was married to Betsy Kimmelman (Karel), a Barnard College-educated photographer. They have two children: Adam and Thomas.

== Selected publications ==
=== Books ===
- Frampton Jr., George; Ben-Veniste, Richard (1977). Stonewall: The real story of the Watergate prosecution. New York, NY: Simon and Schuster. ISBN 978-0671224639.

=== Articles ===
- Frampton, George (January 29, 2017). "Opinion: The Crisis of Climate Change". Washington Post.
- Frampton Jr., George T. (1996). "Ecosystem Management in the Clinton Administration". Duke Environmental Law & Policy Journal. 7 (1): 39–48.
- Frampton Jr., George T. (September 9, 1986). "The Splendor of Big Sur Calls for Federal Protection". Los Angeles Times.
- Frampton Jr., George (1980–1981). "Challenging Restrictive Ballot Access Laws on Behalf of the Independent Candidate". N.Y.U. Rev. L. & Soc. Change. 10: 131. HeinOnline subscription access.

== See also ==
- List of law clerks for the second seat of the Supreme Court of the United States

Government offices
Preceded by Katie McGinty	Chair of the Council on Environmental Quality; 1999–2001	Succeeded by James L. Connaughton
