= Michael Deland =

American politician

Chair of the Council on Environmental Quality
- In office 1989–1993
- President: George H. W. Bush
- Preceded by: A. Alan Hill
- Succeeded by: Katie McGinty

Personal details
- Born: Michael Reeves Deland; December 13, 1941 Boston, Massachusetts, U.S.
- Died: January 8, 2019 (aged 77) Wareham, Massachusetts, U.S.
- Political party: Republican
- Education: Harvard University (BA); Boston College (JD)

Michael Reeves Deland (December 13, 1941 – January 8, 2019) was an American lawyer, government official and environmental consultant. He was appointed Chair of the Council on Environmental Quality by United States President George H. W. Bush in 1989.

From 1983 to 1992 Deland was the Regional Administrator for New England at the U.S. Environmental Protection Agency (EPA). As the head of EPA's office in Boston he led the agency's efforts in the 1980s to clean up Boston Harbor, and worked to protect wetlands areas in New England.

Deland graduated from Harvard University in 1963, served in the U.S. Navy and obtained his Juris Doctor (J.D.) degree from Boston College Law School in 1969. He first joined EPA in 1971, and later worked as an environmental consultant from 1976 to 1983. He became chairman for the non-profit group National Organization on Disability in 2001, until his retirement in 2007.

Political offices
Preceded by A. Alan Hill	Chair of the Council on Environmental Quality; 1989–1993	Succeeded by Katie McGinty
