= A. Alan Hill =

American government official

Alan Hill

Chair of the Council on Environmental Quality
- In office 1981–1989
- President: Ronald Reagan
- Preceded by: Gus Speth
- Succeeded by: Michael Deland

Personal details
- Born: February 11, 1938; Palo Alto, California, U.S.
- Died: October 25, 1996 (aged 58); San Rafael, California, U.S.
- Political party: Republican
- Education: University of the Pacific (BA)

A. Alan Hill (February 1, 1938 - October 25, 1996) was a government official in the United States. He was Chair of the Council on Environmental Quality during Ronald Reagan's presidency and was involved in negotiating legislation with Canada to address acid rain. He also served Reagan when he was governor of California as deputy agriculture secretary and deputy director of California's Conservation Department.

Hill was born in Palo Alto. He graduated from the College of the Pacific and was an aide to California State Senator John F. McCarthy. He was involved in Republican Party organizations in California and ran for a seat in the California State Assembly in 1977 but lost.

He married and had three sons.

Political offices
Preceded by Gus Speth	Chair of the Council on Environmental Quality; 1981–1989	Succeeded by Michael Deland
