= Christy Goldfuss =

American politician

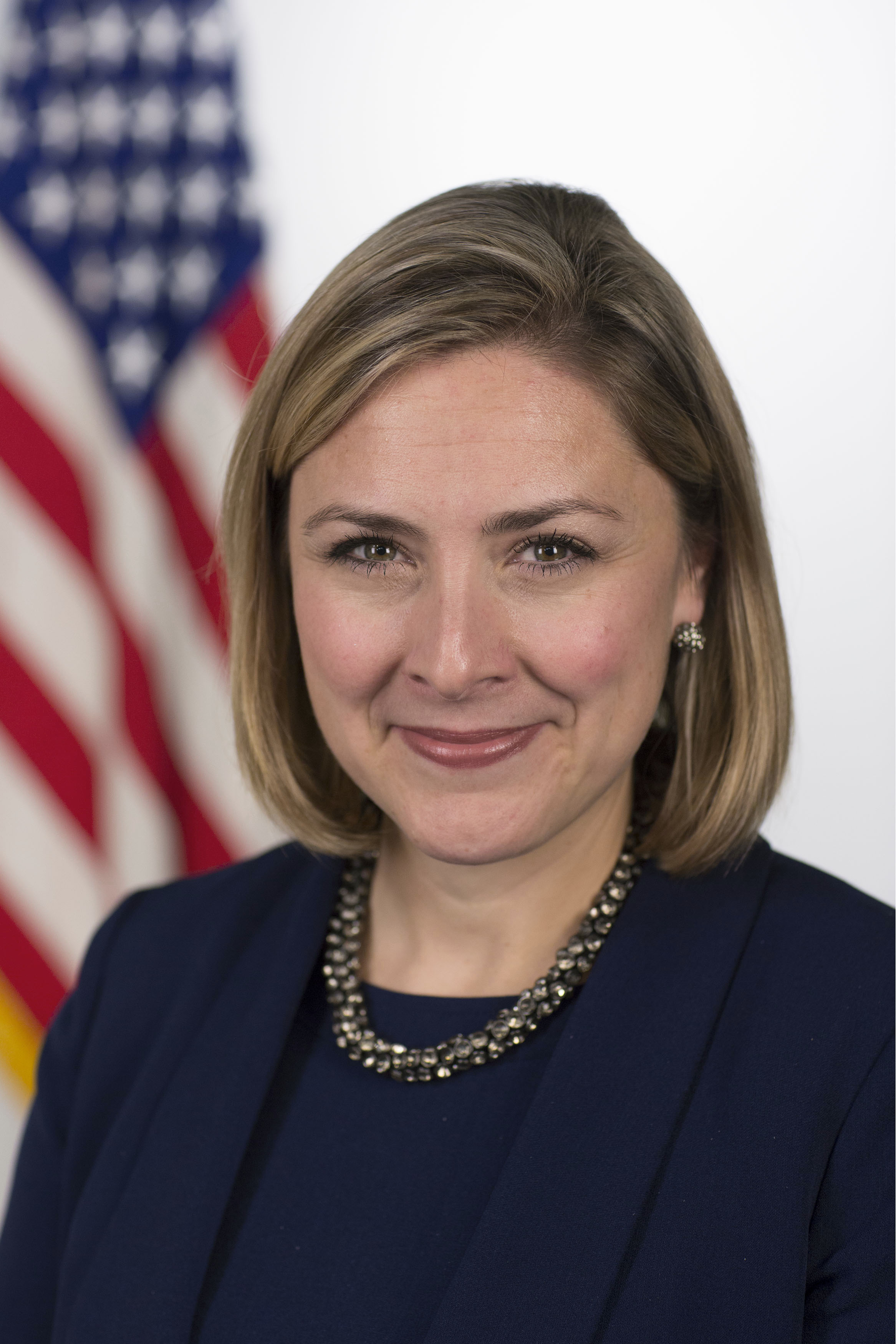

Chair of the Council on Environmental Quality
- Acting
- In office March 2015 – January 20, 2017
- President: Barack Obama
- Preceded by: Mike Boots (acting)
- Succeeded by: Mary Neumayr

Personal details
- Party: Democratic
- Education: Brown University (BA)

Christy Goldfuss is a former American government official who chaired the Council on Environmental Quality (CEQ) within the Executive Office of the President from 2015 to 2017. She served as deputy director of the National Park Service in the Obama administration. She also worked as a legislative staff member for the House Committee on Natural Resources and as a reporter.

== Education ==
Goldfuss graduated from Brown University in 1999 with a degree in Political Science.

== Career ==
Before joining the park service, she worked at the Center for American Progress, a liberal think tank, where she was head of the public lands project.

Following Barack Obama's presidency, Goldfuss rejoined the Center for American Progress. She is a member of the National Infrastructure Advisory Council.

In 2022, Goldfuss joined the non-profit environmental advocacy group the Natural Resources Defense Council (NRDC) as the Chief Policy Impact Officer. In December 2023, she was promoted to NRDC Executive Director. In June 2024, Goldfuss and NRDC President and chief executive officer, Manish Bapna, announced a second round of layoffs impacting 45 employees, 26 of which targeted union members including staff engaged in bargaining.

Political offices
Preceded by Mike Boots; Acting	Chair of the Council on Environmental Quality; Acting; 2015–2017	Succeeded by Mary Neumayr
