= Peter Kwasniewski =

American Catholic theologian (born 1971)

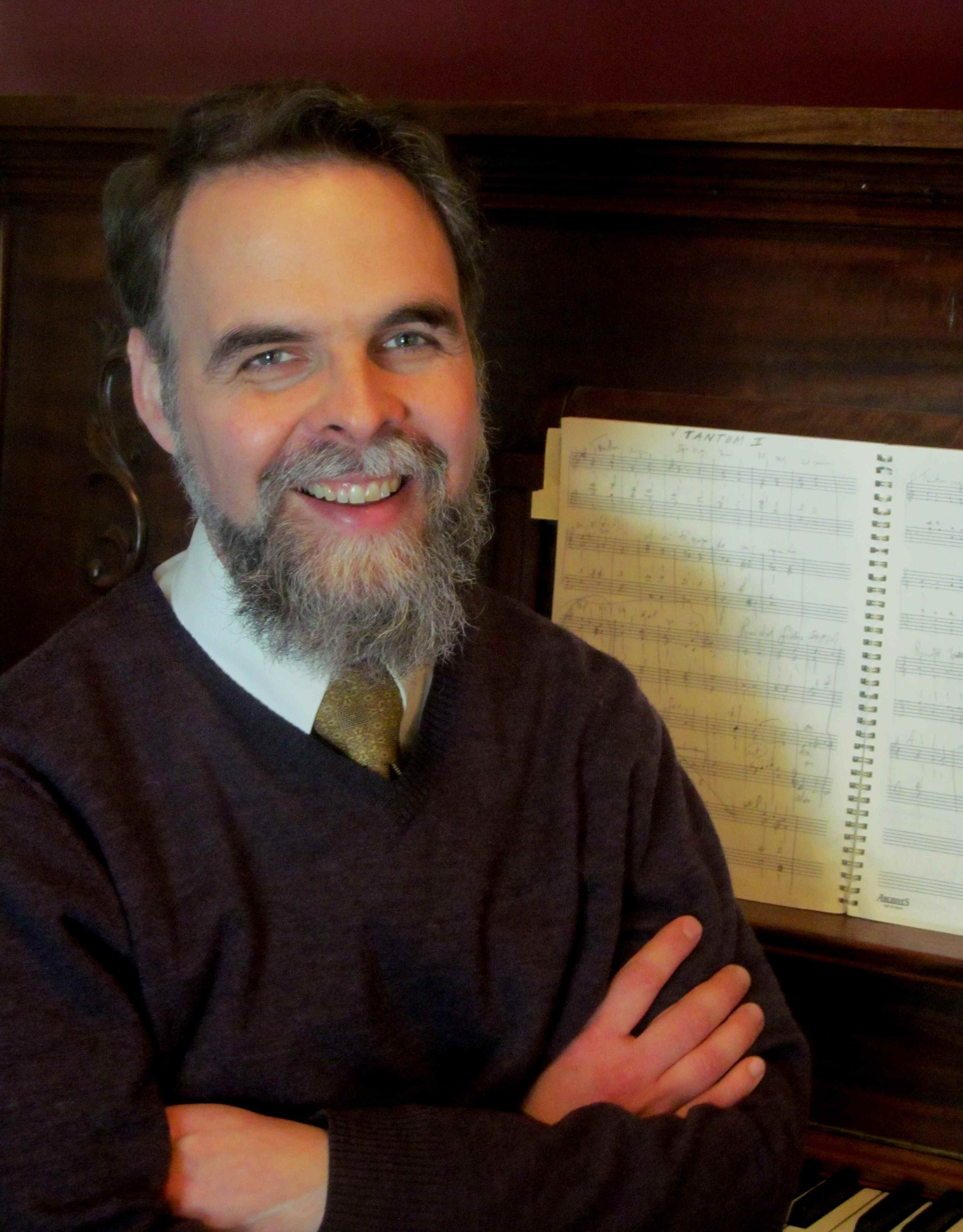
- Born: March 22, 1971 (age 55)
- Education: Thomas Aquinas College (BA); Catholic University of America (MA, Ph.D.)
- Occupations: Author; composer; lecturer
- Writing career
- Genre: Essays
- Subjects: Traditional Latin Mass, sacred music, theology

Peter Andrew Kwasniewski (born March 22, 1971) is an American traditionalist Catholic theologian and composer.

== Life and career ==
Kwasniewski was born on 22 March 1971 in Arlington Heights, Illinois. He grew up in New Jersey. At the Delbarton School in Morristown, he received his first serious tutelage in music. He attended Georgetown University for a single year, before starting as a freshman at Thomas Aquinas College in California, where he received his BA in Liberal Arts in 1994. He received his MA in 1996 and his Ph.D. in 2002 from The Catholic University of America, both in philosophy. His MA thesis in 1996 was entitled "The Dialectic of Reason and Faith in Descartes's Meditationes de prima philosophia" and his Ph.D. dissertation defended in 2002 was entitled "The Ecstasy of Love in Thomas Aquinas".

He was a professor at the International Theological Institute for Studies on Marriage and Family in Austria and an adjunct instructor in music appreciation at the Franciscan University of Steubenville's Austria Program located on the same campus. In 2006, he joined the founding team of Wyoming Catholic College in Lander, Wyoming, where he served as assistant academic dean and director of admissions, and then as choirmaster and professor of theology and philosophy. He also taught music and art history in the college's fine arts curriculum.

In 2016, it was revealed that Kwasniewski was among the clergy and theologians who signed the "Letter of the 45" to all the Catholic cardinals which asked them to "respond to the dangers to Catholic faith and morals" which they alleged that Pope Francis' Amoris Laetitia had posed.

Kwasniewski was a founding board member and scholar of The Aquinas Institute. He remains a fellow of the Albertus Magnus Center for Scholastic Studies.

== Public reception ==
Cardinal Burke with Kwasniewski in Strahov Monastery, Prague

In 2016, Cardinal Burke introduced the Czech translation of Resurgent, calling it "very readable and very accessible" and thanking Kwasniewski "for giving us this work." Other positive publicity for this book included New Oxford Review, which claims that "Kwasniewski accurately sums up the current situation in the Church" and that Resurgent is "a starting point for serious discussion" for "revitalizing the Church".

Kwasniewski's book Noble Beauty, Transcendent Holiness was praised by the Catholic Herald in Britain and National Review, both of which published favorable reviews.

== Music ==
Kwasniewski has also worked as a choirmaster and composer. He studied composition and conducting with Roy Horton, abbey organist and music teacher at Delbarton School at St. Mary's Abbey in Morristown, New Jersey. After this he became an assistant choir director at Thomas Aquinas College in Santa Paula, California (1990–1994). While in graduate school at the Catholic University of America he served as director of the Schola Cantorum at Old St. John's Catholic Church in Silver Spring, Maryland (1994–1998) and later directed music at the International Theological Institute in Gaming, Austria (1999–2006). He was the founding choirmaster and schola director at Wyoming Catholic College (2007–2018) until the time he left to pursue a full-time writing career.

Among compositions that have received numerous concert and church performances since 1990 may be included settings of the Catholic Mass, religious motets, English hymns, Christmas carols, and liturgical antiphons and acclamations. The Mass settings include Missa Spiritus Domini (1994), Missa Spe Salvi (1995, rev. 2012), Missa Brevis à 3 (1997/2020), Missa Hereditas Mihi à 3 (2016), Missa Honorificentia Populi Nostri (2017), and Missa Rex in Æternum (2018). The work Seven Mandatum Antiphons (2010), consisting of English a cappella settings of the texts from the Maundy Thursday liturgy for the washing of the feet, was dedicated to Arvo Pärt on the occasion of the latter's 75th birthday.

Ensembles that have performed Kwasniewski's choral music include the Ecclesia Choir (dir. Timothy Woods), the Vittoria Ensemble (dir. Rick Wheeler), Cantiones Sacrae (dir. Graeme Adamson)—which recorded a CD, Divine Inspirations, of Kwasniewski's music together with that of British composer Nicholas Wilton—and Cantus Magnus (dir. Matthew Schellhorn).

== Bibliography ==
- Ad Orientem: The Direction that Changes Everything (TAN Books) ISBN 9781505140231
- His Reign Shall Have No End: Catholic Social Teaching for the Lionhearted. Waterloo, ON: XIII Books (Arouca Press), 2025. ISBN 978-1-9984-9264-0
- Anatomy of Transcendence: Mental Excess and Rapture in the Thought and Life of Thomas Aquinas. Steubenville, OH: Emmaus Road Publishing, 2025. ISBN 978-1-6458-5428-9
- Close the Workshop: Why the Old Mass Isn’t Broken and the New Mass Can’t Be Fixed. Brooklyn, NY: Angelico Press, 2025. ISBN 979-8-8928-0077-8
- Turned Around: Replying to the Most Common Objections Against the Traditional Latin Mass. Gastonia, NC: TAN Books, 2022. ISBN 978-1-5051-3362-2
- Bound by Truth: Authority, Obedience, Tradition, and the Common Good. Brooklyn, NY: Angelico Press, 2023. ISBN 978-162138-96-20
- Illusions of Reform: Responses to Cavadini, Healy, and Weinandy in Defense of the Traditional Mass and the Faithful Who Attend It. Edited and with contributions by Peter Kwasniewski. Lincoln, NE: Os Justi Press, 2023. ISBN 978-1960711076
- Good Music, Sacred Music, and Silence: Three Gifts of God for Liturgy and for Life. Gastonia, NC: TAN Books, 2023. ISBN 978-1505122282
- Treasuring the Goods of Marriage in a Throwaway Society. Manchester, NH: Sophia Institute Press, 2023. ISBN 978-1644138540
- Sixty Years After: Catholic Writers Assess the Legacy of Vatican II. Edited and with a contribution by Peter Kwasniewski. Brooklyn, NY: Angelico Press, 2022. ISBN 978-1621388890
- The Once and Future Roman Rite: Returning to the Traditional Latin Liturgy after Seventy Years of Exile. Gastonia, NC: TAN Books, 2022. ISBN 978-1-5051-2662-4
- The Road from Hyperpapalism to Catholicism: Rethinking the Papacy in a Time of Ecclesial Disintegration. Volume 1: Theological Reflections on the Rock of the Church. Waterloo, ON: Arouca Press, 2022. ISBN 978-1-990685-10-1
- The Road from Hyperpapalism to Catholicism: Rethinking the Papacy in a Time of Ecclesial Disintegration. Volume 2: Chronological Responses to an Unfolding Pontificate. Waterloo, ON: Arouca Press, 2022. ISBN 978-1-990685-12-5
- True Obedience in the Church: A Guide to Discernment in Challenging Times. Manchester, NH: Sophia Institute Press, 2021. ISBN 978-1-6441-3674-4
- Ministers of Christ: Recovering the Roles of Clergy and Laity in an Age of Confusion. Foreword by Leila Marie Lawler. Manchester, NH: Crisis Publications, 2021. ISBN 978-1-6441-3536-5
- Integralism and the Common Good: Selected Essays from The Josias, vol. 1: Family, City, and State. Co-edited with P. Edmund Waldstein, O.Cist. Brooklyn, NY: Angelico Press, 2021. ISBN 978-1-6213-8789-3
- From Benedict's Peace to Francis's War: Catholics Respond to the Motu Proprio Traditionis Custodes on the Latin Mass. Edited with a preface and six contributions by Peter Kwasniewski. Brooklyn, NY: Angelico Press, 2021. ISBN 978-1-6213-8786-2
- Are Canonizations Infallible? Revisiting a Disputed Question. Edited with a preface and a contribution by Peter Kwasniewski. Waterloo, Ontario: Arouca Press, 2021. ISBN 978-1-9899-0564-7
- The Ecstasy of Love in the Thought of Thomas Aquinas. Steubenville, OH: Emmaus Academic, 2021. ISBN 978-1-6458-5104-2
- The Holy Bread of Eternal Life. Restoring Eucharistic Reverence in an Age of Impiety. Manchester, NH: Sophia Institute Press, 2020. ISBN 978-1-6441-3433-7
- Reclaiming Our Roman Catholic Birthright: The Genius and Timeliness of the Traditional Latin Mass. Brooklyn, NY: Angelico Press, 2020. ISBN 978-1-6213-8535-6
- And Rightly So—Selected Letters and Articles of Neil McCaffrey. Edited with a preface by Peter A. Kwasniewski. Fort Collins, CO: Roman Catholic Books, 2019.
- Tradition and Sanity. Conversations and Dialogues of a Postconciliar Exile. Brooklyn, NY: Angelico Press, 2018. ISBN 978-1-6213-8417-5
- A Reader in Catholic Social Teaching: From Syllabus Errorum to Deus Caritas Est. Edited, annotated, and with a Preface by Peter Kwasniewski. Tacoma, WA: Cluny Media, 2017. ISBN 978-1-9444-1858-8
- Noble Beauty, Transcendent Holiness: Why the Modern Age Needs the Mass of Ages. Kettering, OH: Angelico Press, 2017. ISBN 978-1-6213-8284-3
- Resurgent in the Midst of Crisis: Sacred Liturgy, the Traditional Latin Mass, and Renewal in the Church. Kettering, OH: Angelico Press, 2015. ISBN 978-1-6213-8087-0
- Sacred Choral Works. N.p.: Corpus Christi Watershed, 2014.
- On Love and Charity: Readings from the Commentary on the Sentences of Peter Lombard. [A translation of texts from St. Thomas Aquinas's Commentary on the Sentences, containing Book I, Distinction 17, in both the Parisian and the Roman versions; Book III, Distinctions 27 to 32; and selected articles from all four Books.] Washington, DC: The Catholic University of America Press, 2008. ISBN 978-0-8132-1525-9
- Wisdom’s Apprentice. Thomistic Essays in Honor of Lawrence Dewan, O.P. Edited and introduced by Peter A. Kwasniewski. [A Festschrift of twelve essays with biography and bibliography of the honoree.] Washington, DC: The Catholic University of America Press, 2007. ISBN 978-0-8132-1495-5
