= Brenda Mallory (public official) =

American government official (born 1957)

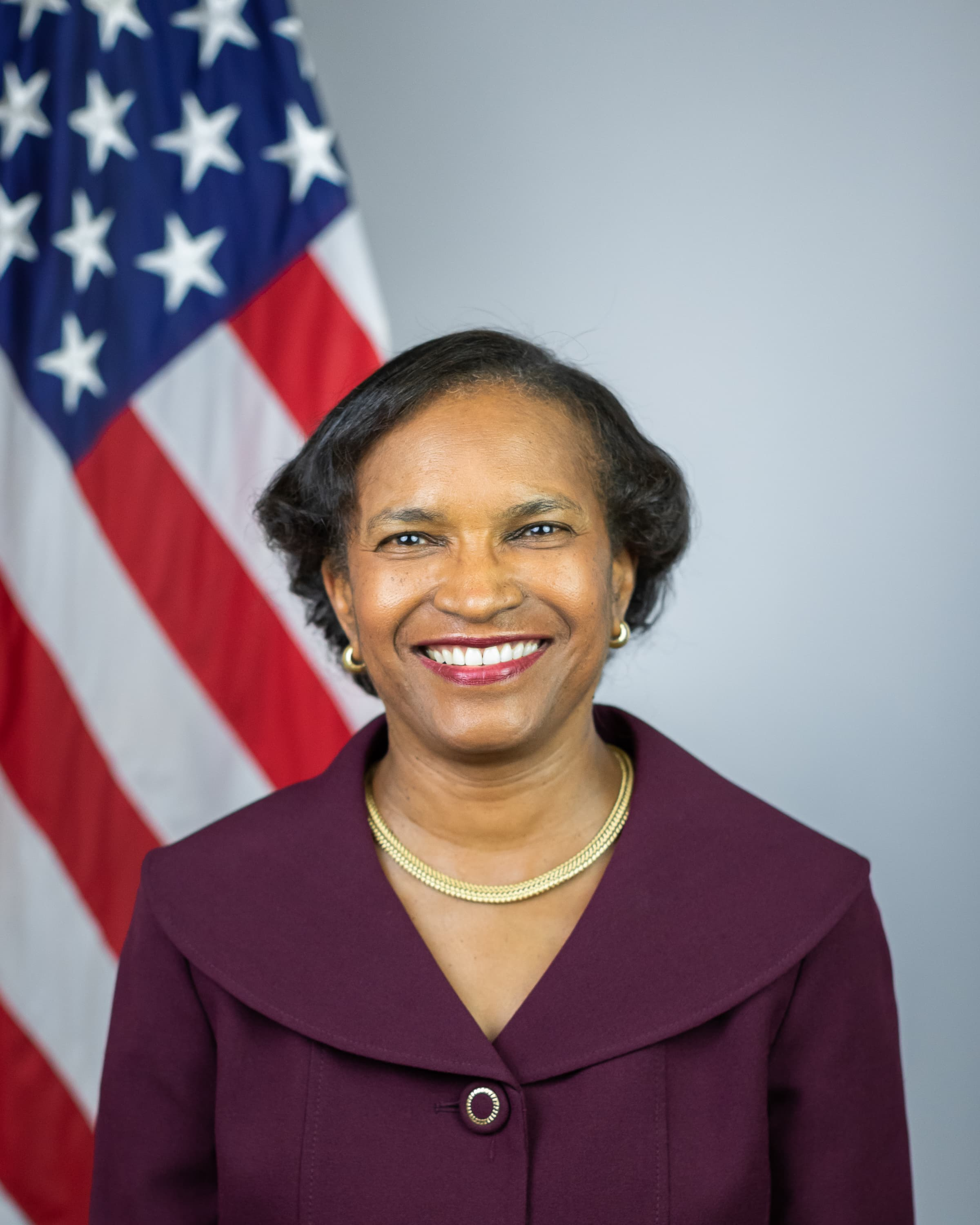

Chair of the Council on Environmental Quality
- In office April 14, 2021 – January 20, 2025
- President: Joe Biden
- Preceded by: Mary Neumayr
- Succeeded by: Katherine Scarlett

Personal details
- Born: September 14, 1957 (age 68) Waterbury, Connecticut, U.S.
- Education: Yale University (BA); Columbia University (JD)

Brenda Mallory (born September 14, 1957) is an American lawyer specializing in environmental law who served as the chair of the Council on Environmental Quality in the Biden administration from 2021 to 2025. She previously served as director of regulatory policy at the Southern Environmental Law Center, and helped lead the Climate 21 Project.

Mallory served as acting general counsel for the Council on Environmental Quality in the Obama administration from January 4, 2013 to August 6, 2013 between Scott Fulton and Avi Garbow.

== Early life ==
Mallory was raised in an industrial, working-class community in Waterbury, Connecticut, and then attended the prestigious Westover boarding school in Middlebury, Connecticut, on a scholarship. Mallory graduated from Yale College and then Columbia Law School, and started in private practice as an attorney before joining the U.S. federal government in 2000.

== Career ==
Mallory is the former executive director and senior counsel at the Conservation Litigation Project, which works to protect public lands, and served as general counsel of the White House Council on Environmental Quality in the Obama administration. Before the Council on Environmental Quality, she served as the principal deputy general counsel at the United States Environmental Protection Agency (EPA), which is the ranking career position in that office. She served in both Democratic and Republican administrations over fifteen years at the EPA. Before Mallory joined the EPA, she was the chair of the natural resources practice group at the environmental law firm Beveridge and Diamond.

According to the Environmental Law Institute, Mallory is a Fellow in the American College of Environmental Lawyers and is a member of the Environmental Defense Fund's Litigation Advocacy Committee. Mallory also serves on the Environmental Policy Innovation Center's Advisory Committee, the Advisory Council for Women in Conservation Leadership, and the Board of Directors of the Environmental Law Institute and at the Center for Climate and Energy Solutions.

Mallory helped lead The Climate 21 Project, which NPR reports "delivered recommendations for how the Biden administration could enlist the breadth of the government to address climate damage, including that 'the Council on Environmental Quality is best suited to elevate environmental justice to the White House and to lead the agenda on climate change resilience.'"

On December 16, 2020, Mallory was reported to be the nominee selected by President-elect Joe Biden to run the White House Council on Environmental Quality (CEQ) in his administration. Reuters wrote that Biden's choice "signals a focus by the incoming administration on environmental policies that would aim to ensure improved clean air and water for poor and minority communities that have historically taken the brunt of industrial pollution, and on pursuing Biden’s overarching plan to fight climate change."

The Washington Post wrote that her nomination "would place a veteran government official and conservation advocate in a key administration post, one who works closely with agencies to shape federal environmental and energy policy and to ensure individual communities have a voice in the construction of pipelines, roads and other potentially polluting projects." Bloomberg News wrote that if confirmed, Mallory will "play a pivotal role guiding environmental policy decisions across the federal government," including the implementation of the National Environmental Policy Act. NPR wrote that "Mallory's appointment fleshes out a climate team with expertise in regulation, finance, diplomacy and environmental law" and "Environmental advocates welcomed Mallory's impending nomination, citing her expertise on climate and on environmental equity."

On April 14, 2021, Mallory was confirmed as the leader of the White House Council on Environmental Quality (CEQ) by a 53–45 vote in the United States Senate. She is the first African American chair of the CEQ. The CEQ is responsible for implementing the National Environmental Policy Act (NEPA), and has influence over large infrastructure projects. In a statement, Mallory said, "By helping forge unity of purpose – across communities, across the country, and across government – CEQ will help our nation rise to the environmental challenges of our time, from climate change and the nature crisis to the environmental injustices that have plagued our country for too long."

== Personal life ==
Mallory resides in Rockville, Maryland with her husband and has three adult children.

Political offices
Preceded by Mary Neumayr	Chair of the Council on Environmental Quality; 2021–2025	Succeeded by Katherine Scarlett
