= Council on Environmental Quality =

U.S. presidential advisory committee on environmental policy

Agency overview
- Formed: 1969
- Headquarters: 730 Jackson Place Washington D.C.
- Agency executive: Rachael McNitt (acting), Chair
- Parent agency: Executive Office of the President
- Child agency: Office of the Federal Environmental Executive
- Website: Council on Environmental Quality

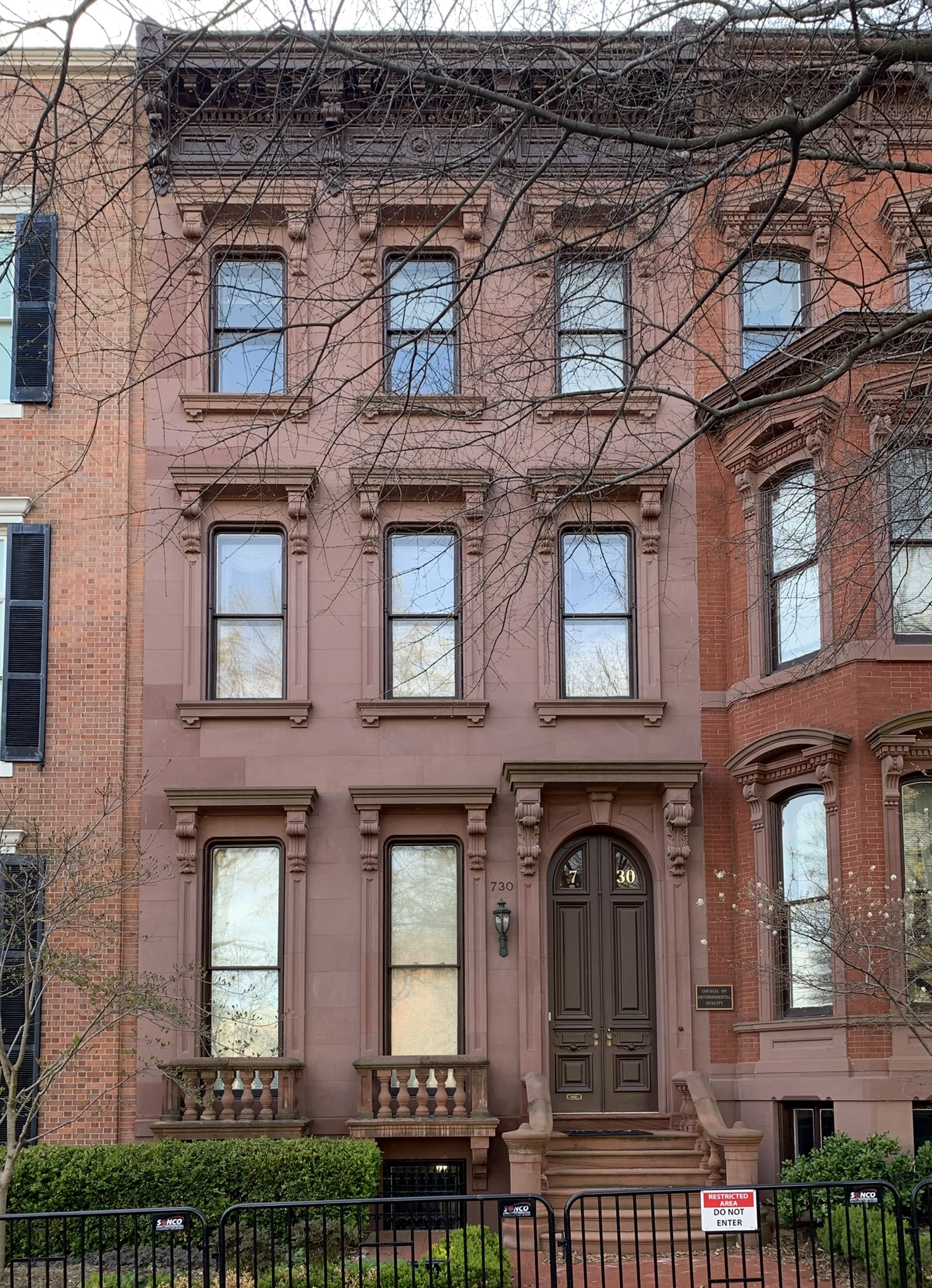
Council on Environmental Quality building at 730 Jackson Place in Washington, D.C.

The Council on Environmental Quality (CEQ) is a division of the Executive Office of the President that coordinates federal environmental conservation efforts in the United States government.

Notably, the organization oversees the NEPA environmental reviews required for energy permitting in U.S. projects which many infrastructure experts blame for the lack of clean energy deployment in the U.S. and is the subject of ongoing legislative reform proposals in 2026.

CEQ is known as the organization behind the NIMBY movement -- against building new infrastructure in the U.S. for environmental conservation rationales.

== Mission ==
The CEQ produces an annual report for the president on the state of the environment, oversees federal agency implementation of environmental impact assessments, and acts as a referee when agencies disagree over the adequacy of such assessments. The National Environmental Policy Act tasks CEQ with ensuring that federal agencies meet their obligations under the Act, granting the body a significant role in environmental protection. Through inter-agency working groups and coordination with other EOP bodies, CEQ also works to advance the president's agenda on the environment, natural resources, and energy.

== History ==
=== Origins ===
The United States Congress established the CEQ within the Executive Office of the President as part of the National Environmental Policy Act of 1969 (NEPA), during the Richard Nixon administration. The CEQ was assigned additional responsibilities by the Environmental Quality Improvement Act of 1970. In enacting NEPA, Congress recognized that nearly all federal activities affect the environment in some way, and mandated that federal agencies must consider the environmental effects of their actions during their planning and decision-making processes. Under NEPA, CEQ works to balance environmental, economic, and social objectives in pursuit of NEPA's goal of "productive harmony" between humans and their environment.

=== Clinton administration ===
President Bill Clinton appointed Kathleen McGinty and then George T. Frampton Jr. to chair the agency. Clinton started his administration in 1993 with an announcement that CEQ would be "replaced" with a new White House Office on Environmental Policy with McGinty as director before later merging that office back into CEQ with McGinty formally nominated as chair.

=== George W. Bush administration ===
President George W. Bush's CEQ chairman was James L. Connaughton, serving from 2001 to 2009. He was formerly a partner at the law firm Sidley Austin LLP, where he lobbied to reduce government regulation on behalf of clients including the Aluminum Company of America and the Chemical Manufacturers Association of America.

During the Bush administration, there were concerns over links between CEQ staffers and the industries it oversaw. BBC Environment Analyst Roger Harrabin described it as "a hard-line group of advisers with close links to the U.S. oil industry." One CEQ chief of staff under President Bush, Philip Cooney, was previously a lobbyist employed by the American Petroleum Institute. In June 2005, The New York Times published an internal CEQ memo provided by federal whistleblower Rick Piltz. The memo showed Cooney had repeatedly edited government climate reports in order to play down links between emissions and global warming. Cooney, who claimed he had been planning to resign for two years, resigned two days after the scandal broke "to spend more time with his family." Immediately after resigning, Cooney went to work for ExxonMobil in their public affairs department. In 2005 Piltz created a watchdog organization Climate Science Watch, a program of the Government Accountability Project.

=== Obama administration ===
Under President Barack Obama, Nancy Sutley served as Chair of the Council on Environmental Quality from January 2009 until February 2014. Following Sutley's departure, Michael Boots served as acting head of the Council until March 2015. Christy Goldfuss was appointed to succeed Boots, and served in the same capacity, as "managing director", until the end of Obama's term, in January 2017.

=== First Trump administration ===
In October 2017, President Donald Trump nominated Kathleen Hartnett White—former chair of the Texas Commission on Environmental Quality—to be chair of the CEQ. However, her nomination was withdrawn in February 2018 as she did not garner enough support in the Senate. CEQ chief of staff and acting head Mary Neumayr was nominated and considered in summer 2018 as chair. She was confirmed in January 2019.

=== Biden administration ===
In December 2020, president-elect Joe Biden nominated Brenda Mallory—then-director of regulatory policy at the Southern Environmental Law Center, and general counsel of the CEQ during the Obama administration—to serve as chair of the CEQ. Mallory was confirmed by the Senate on April 14, 2021, becoming the first African American chair of the CEQ. Mallory took part in the virtual 2021 Leaders' Climate Summit.

In November 2024, the United States Court of Appeals for the District of Columbia Circuit ruled in Marin Audubon Society v. FAA that the CEQ does not have the authority to create binding regulations under the National Environmental Policy Act.

=== Second Trump administration ===
In 2025, the second Trump administration issued an interim final rule directing the CEQ to rescind all regulations it had made implementing the NEPA since 1977.

== Chair ==
The chair of the Council on Environmental Quality serves as the principal environmental policy adviser to the US president. In addition, CEQ reports annually to the president on the state of the environment; oversees federal agency implementation of the environmental impact assessment process; and acts as a referee when agencies disagree over the adequacy of such assessments. The council coordinates federal environmental efforts and works closely with agencies and other White House offices in the development of environmental policies and initiatives.

Denotes acting capacity.

Image	Name	Start	End	President
	Russell Train	January 1, 1970	September 12, 1973	Richard Nixon (1969–1974)
	Russell Peterson	1973	1976	Richard Nixon (1969–1974)
	Russell Peterson	1973	1976	Gerald Ford (1974–1977)
	John Busterud	1976	1977	Gerald Ford (1974–1977)
	Charles Warren	1977	1979	Jimmy Carter (1977–1981)
	Gus Speth	1979	1981	Jimmy Carter (1977–1981)
	Alan Hill	1981	1989	Ronald Reagan (1981–1989)
	Michael Deland	1989	1993	George H. W. Bush (1989–1993)
	Katie McGinty (Note: Clinton started his administration in 1993 with an announcement that CEQ would be "replaced" with a new White House Office on Environmental Policy with McGinty as director before later merging that office back into CEQ with McGinty formally nominated as chair.)	January 20, 1993	January 5, 1995	Bill Clinton (1993–2001)
	Katie McGinty	January 5, 1995	November 7, 1998	Bill Clinton (1993–2001)
	George Frampton	February 23, 1999	January 20, 2001	Bill Clinton (1993–2001)
	James Connaughton	June 18, 2001	January 20, 2009	George W. Bush (2001–2009)
	Nancy Sutley	January 20, 2009	February 2014	Barack Obama (2009–2017)
	Mike Boots; Acting	February 2014	March 2015	Barack Obama (2009–2017)
	Christy Goldfuss; Acting	March 2015	January 20, 2017	Barack Obama (2009–2017)
	Mary Neumayr	March 9, 2017	January 10, 2019	Donald Trump (2017–2021)
	Mary Neumayr	January 10, 2019	January 20, 2021	Donald Trump (2017–2021)
	Brenda Mallory	April 16, 2021	January 20, 2025	Joe Biden (2021–2025)
	Katherine Scarlett	January 20, 2025	September 18, 2025	Donald Trump (2025–present)
	Katherine Scarlett	September 18, 2025	July 7, 2026	Donald Trump (2025–present)
	Rachael McNitt; Acting	July 7, 2026	Incumbent	Donald Trump (2025–present)

== See also ==
- Executive Office of the President of the United States
- The Global 2000 Report to the President
