= Holman W. Jenkins Jr. =

American journalist

Holman W. Jenkins Jr. is an American columnist, editorial writer, and member of The Wall Street Journal editorial board. He writes the biweekly column "Business World," which appears in the paper and online every Wednesday and Saturday. Aside from writing for The Wall Street Journal, he has also written for Policy Review and National Review.

== Biography ==
Jenkins was born in 1959 and grew up in Swarthmore, Pennsylvania. He earned a bachelor's degree from Hobart and William Smith Colleges and a master's degree in journalism from Northwestern University. Jenkins joined the Wall Street Journal in May 1992 as a writer for the editorial page in New York. In late 1993 he became editor of the Asian Wall Street Journal's editorial page in Hong Kong. He returned to the United States in 1995 as a member of the paper's editorial board.

=== Awards ===
He was appointed a Knight-Wallace Fellowship at the University of Michigan in 1991-1992. In 1997 he was awarded the Gerald Loeb Award for Commentary and in 2013 he became the inaugural winner of the Calvin Coolidge Prize for Journalism.
