= Mary Neumayr =

American government official (born 1964)

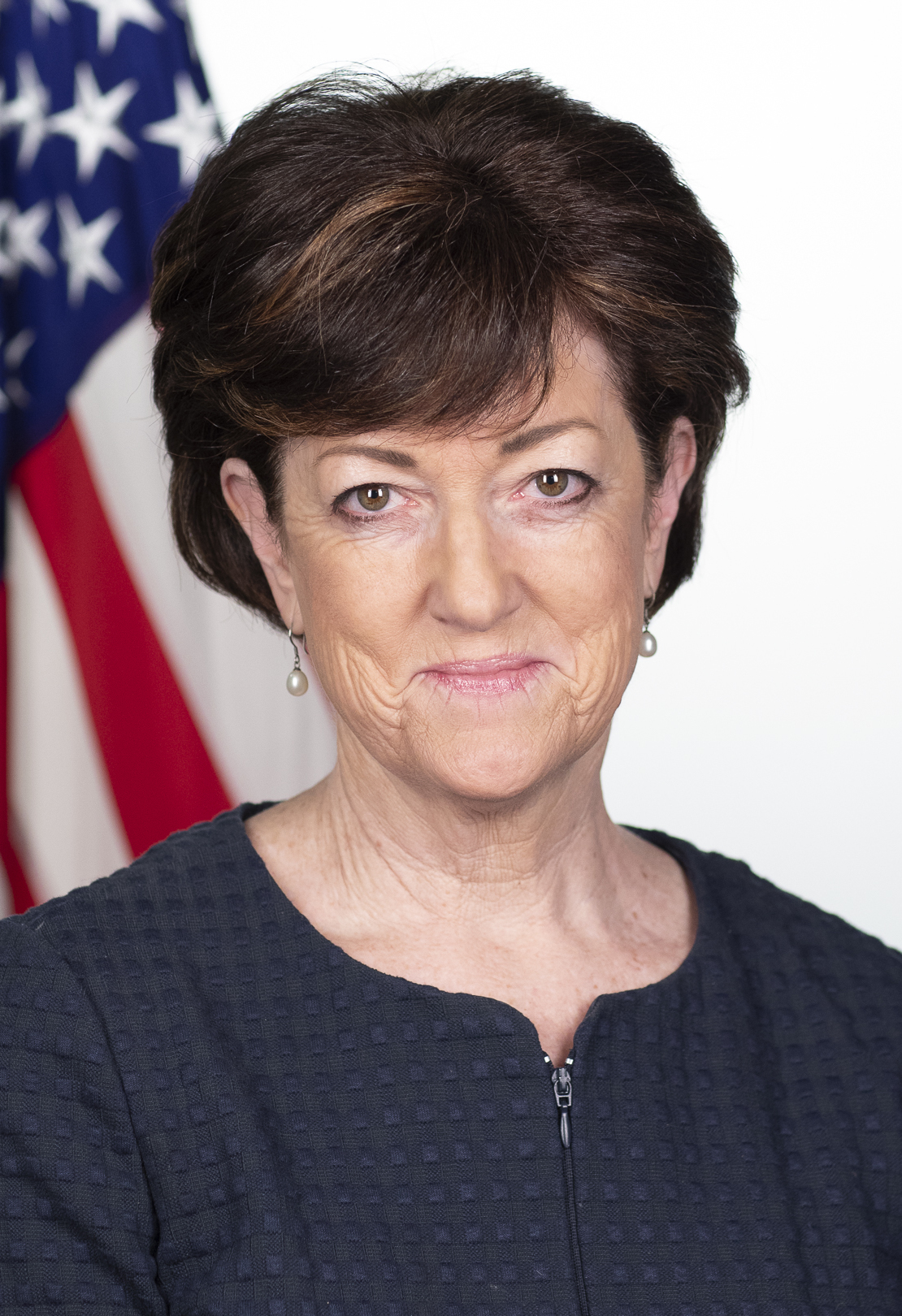

Chair of the Council on Environmental Quality
- In office March 9, 2017 – January 20, 2021; Acting: March 9, 2017 – January 10, 2019
- President: Donald Trump
- Preceded by: Christy Goldfuss
- Succeeded by: Brenda Mallory

Personal details
- Born: Mary Bridget Neumayr; September 18, 1964 (age 60); San Jose, California, U.S.
- Political party: Republican
- Education: Thomas Aquinas College (BA); University of California, Hastings (JD)

Mary Bridget Neumayr (born September 18, 1964) is an American government official, who served as the chair of the Council on Environmental Quality from 2019 to 2021. She was appointed to the position by President Donald Trump in January 2019 and confirmed by the United States Senate.

== Early life and education ==
Neumayr was born in the San Francisco Bay Area and raised in the suburbs of Los Angeles. Neumayr received a Bachelor's Degree from Thomas Aquinas College and Juris Doctor from the University of California, Hastings College of the Law.

== Career ==
After graduation, Neumayr was in private legal practice from 1989 through 2003 in New York City and San Francisco.

Neumayr served in a variety of legal positions with the United States House Committee on Energy and Commerce. She also served as counsel at the United States Department of Justice from 2003 to 2006, and as Deputy General Counsel for Environment and Nuclear Programs at the United States Department of Energy from 2006 to 2009.

In March 2017, Neumayr was named as Chief of Staff of the Council on Environmental Quality.

Political offices
Preceded by Christy Goldfuss	Chair of the Council on Environmental Quality; 2017–2021; Acting: 2017–2019	Succeeded by Brenda Mallory
