= Thomas Aquinas College =

Catholic liberal arts college in California, U.S.

- Motto: Fides Quarens Intellectum (Latin)
- Motto in English: "Faith Seeking Understanding"
- Type: Private liberal arts college
- Established: 1971
- Accreditation: WASC
- Religious affiliation: Catholic
- President: Paul J. O'Reilly
- Faculty: 58
- Undergraduates: 566
- Location: Santa Paula, California, United States; 34.430°N 119.087°W
- Campus: 845 acres (3.42 km^{2}); Rural
- Other campuses: Northfield, MA
- Colors: Maroon & black
- Website: www.thomasaquinas.edu

Thomas Aquinas College is a private Catholic liberal arts college in the United States with two campuses, one in Santa Paula, California, and one in Northfield, Massachusetts. The college was founded in 1971 and is named for St. Thomas Aquinas, a thirteenth-century scholar and Catholic theologian. All students pursue a Bachelor of Arts centered on a common curriculum.

== History ==
Thomas Aquinas College was founded in the late 1960s and early 1970s. The college's founding document, A Proposal for the Fulfillment of Catholic Liberal Education, set out a vision that draws on the traditions of the liberal arts and the Catholic Church to provide a timeless education. The founding president was Ronald P. McArthur.

The college opened in the fall of 1971 at a temporary campus in Calabasas, California. In 1978, the college moved to a new site in Santa Paula, California. In 2019, with the Santa Paula campus at capacity, the college opened a second campus in Northfield, Massachusetts. Both campuses are under the authority of the same board of governors and follow the same curriculum.

Thomas Aquinas College is accredited by the WASC Senior College and University Commission.

The president of the college is Paul J. O'Reilly.

== Academics ==
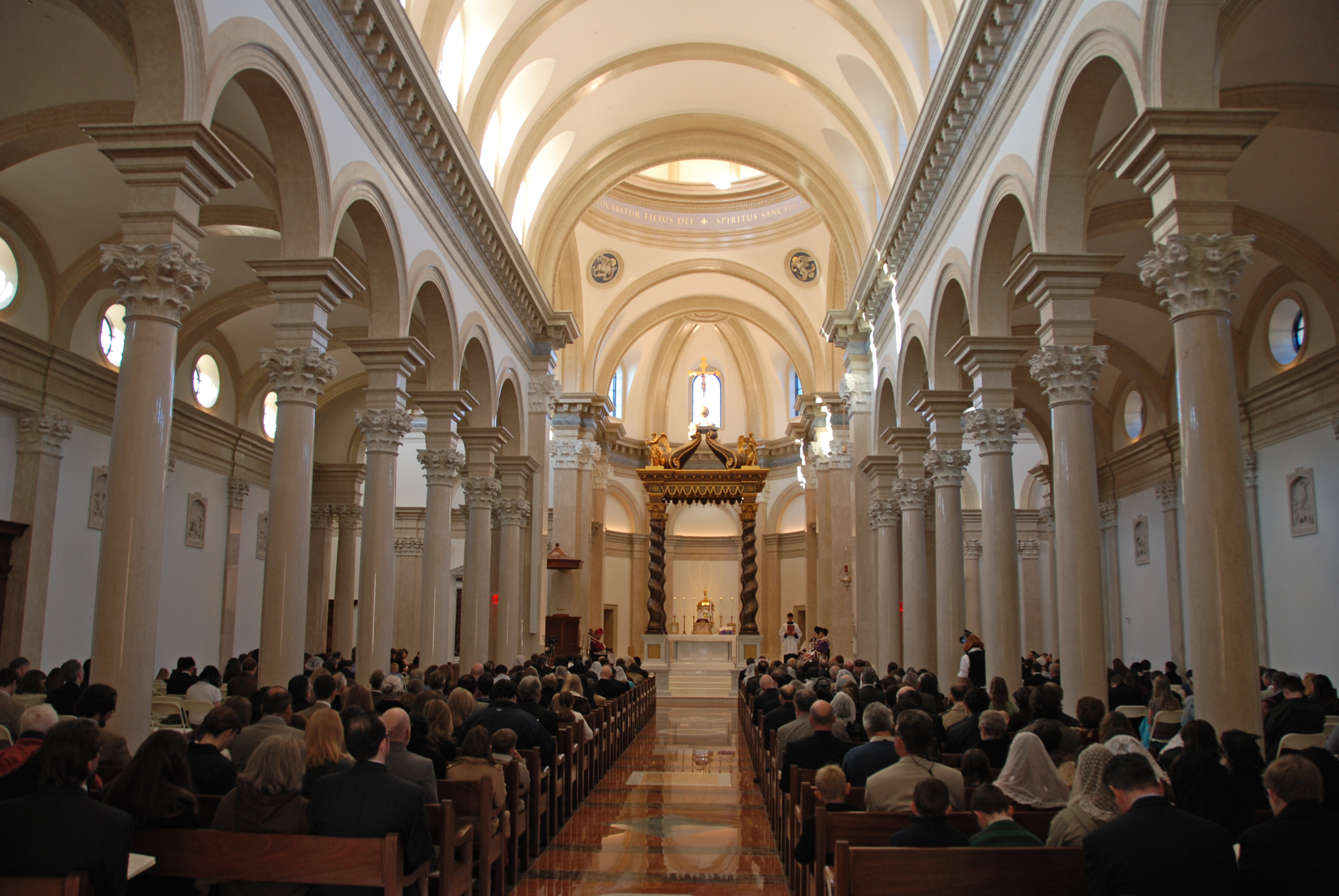
Our Lady of the Most Holy Trinity Chapel interior

Thomas Aquinas College offers one degree, a Bachelor of Arts in liberal arts. This is an integrated liberal arts curriculum made up primarily of the Great Books, with the order of learning emphasized in the structure of the curriculum. Students engage in a series of tutorials, seminars, and laboratories, guided by tutors (professors) who assist them in understanding and engaging with these works. The average class size is 15. Each student researches and writes a senior thesis on a topic that may be selected from any part of the curriculum.

== Campuses ==
=== California ===
The Santa Paula campus is set on 835 acres and contains a series of buildings, many built in Spanish Revival Mission-style, constructed after the college began operations there in 1978. It is located close to the Topatopa mountains, Los Padres National Forest, the beaches of Ventura County, and the cities of Los Angeles and Pasadena.

==== Notable buildings ====
As the "crown jewel" of the campus, Our Lady of the Most Holy Trinity Chapel was dedicated on March 7, 2009. The design for this 15,000-square-foot (1,400 m^{2}), $23 million building employs Early Christian, Renaissance, and Spanish Mission styles. Designed by the New Classical architect Duncan Stroik, it is cruciform in shape and features both a 135-foot (41 m) bell tower and an 89-foot (27 m) dome. The baldachin is inspired by Bernini's design in St. Peter's Basilica. Pope John Paul II blessed the chapel's plans in 2003, and in 2008, Pope Benedict XVI blessed its cornerstone. Adoremus Bulletin has called Our Lady of the Most Holy Trinity Chapel "A Triumph of Sacred Architecture".

St. Bernardine of Siena Library was opened in 1995, is approximately 18,800 square feet, and was designed in the Spanish Mission Revival style. The library’s ceiling, a rare example of an artesonado, was originally crafted in 1620 for a Spanish convent and was donated to the college. The library has a collection of rarities including thousands-year-old Hittite seals and devotional and sacred objects of saints. The library, along with the Dolben Library on the New England campus, holds a total of approximately 65,900 books and recordings.

=== New England ===
The Northfield campus comprises 110 acres and features the traditional red brick architecture of its nineteenth-century Massachusetts heritage. Located in the Connecticut River Valley, the campus is close to Mount Monadnock, recreation on the Connecticut River, and many ski areas. Boston is 90 miles to the east.

The campus was gifted to Thomas Aquinas College in 2017 by the National Christian Foundation. The buildings and campus formerly were part of the Northfield Mount Hermon School, a preparatory school which moved to another campus in 2005.

==== Notable buildings ====
Our Mother of Perpetual Help Chapel was constructed in 1909. The chapel features a Gothic revival style, and as with the chapel on the California campus, it is cruciform in shape. After the college acquired the building in 2017, significant alterations were made to transform it into a site for Catholic worship, while maintaining the chapel’s beauty and heritage. On March 7, 2022, the chapel was rededicated, an occasion marked with a Mass celebrated by Bishop William Byrne of the Diocese of Springfield. The chapel’s altars contain relics of St. John Henry Newman and St. Thomas Aquinas.

Dolben Library was completed in 1987, a gift from Don Dolben in honor of his late wife, Catherine Kirmayer Dolben, who graduated from Northfield Mount Hermon in 1954. The building features a “New Victorian” style that echoes many of the buildings on campus, and is approximately 30,000 feet in size. In 1988, Dolben Library received the Award for Excellence in Architecture from the American Institute of Architects, New England. The library, along with the St. Bernardine of Siena Library on the California campus, holds a total of approximately 65,900 books and recordings.

== Student life ==
The combined student population for the two campuses is 566. There is an approximately 50-50 split between men and women. Students on both campuses have access to many opportunities for extracurricular activities such as dances and open mic nights. Intramural sports are practiced throughout the year and include volleyball, soccer, flag football, and basketball.

Chaplains reside on both campuses to offer the Sacraments and spiritual direction. Mass is celebrated four times each day on the California campus and twice each day on the New England campus.

Unmarried students live on campus in single-sex dormitories. Men's and women's residence halls are off-limits to members of the opposite sex. Kitchenettes and laundry facilities are available in each dorm. Campus dress is more formal than at most colleges.

The possession or use of alcohol or illegal drugs on campus is prohibited and may entail expulsion from the college.

=== California Campus ===
The St. John Paul II athletic center is home to a climbing wall, gymnasium, outdoor tennis and basketball courts, and an outdoor pool. The athletic center is the newest building on the California campus, opening its doors in early 2022.

The St. Genesius Players produce one play a year, commonly a selection from Shakespeare. The College Choir presents an annual concert and a spring musical. The choir sings at Sunday Mass as well as special events. A second student choir, often joined by various instrumentalists and vocalists from the student body, performs at formal and informal events throughout the year. Spaces for music practice and performance include St. Cecilia Hall, which houses a grand piano.

=== New England Campus ===
The Pope St. John Paul II Athletic Center includes basketball courts, workout and weight rooms, rock climbing, and a dance studio, in addition to an indoor swimming pool. Margaret Olivia Music Hall contains multiple practice rooms in an impressive architectural setting. In the Advent season, there is a traditional “Lessons and Carols” performance, helping to prepare the campus community for Christmas.

Both campuses host a Schola Gregoriana choir who provide solemn choral music for Sunday’s Extraordinary Form Mass.

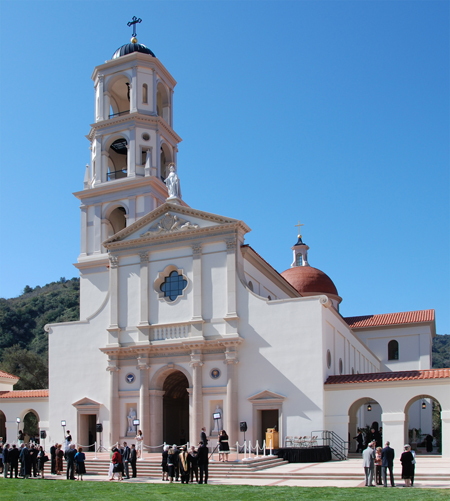
Our Lady of the Most Holy Trinity Chapel

== Admissions ==
Prospective students can apply to either the California campus or the New England campus. The college has a rolling admissions process, evaluating each applicant on individual merit. There is no required minimum for standardized tests, but the average SAT score, combined for Reading and Writing along with Math) is 1280.

Tuition in 2025-26 was $31,000 and food and housing costs totaled $11,400.

The college is dedicated to providing substantial financial aid, meeting 100% of students’ demonstrated financial need. Seventy percent of incoming students receive need-based financial aid. Thomas Aquinas College does not offer merit scholarships.

As a result of legal requirements in the Commonwealth of Massachusetts, only Catholic students are admitted to the New England campus. The California campus admits students from all religious traditions.

One of the college’s features is the Great Books Summer Program. Both campuses hold summer sessions, with a choice of one week or two, for rising high school seniors that combine classroom experiences that provide a sample of the college’s academics, together with recreational opportunities on campus and in the surrounding areas. The stated purpose is to “To ask the big questions, explore their answers, and forge new friendships.”

== Rankings and reputation ==
The 2025 National Catholic Register Catholic Identity College Guide notes that "Thomas Aquinas College is the only faithfully Catholic college that offers a fully integrated Great Books curriculum that spans all the major disciplines and is taught entirely via classroom discussion."

In 2026, U.S. News & World Report ranked Thomas Aquinas College: #55 in "National Liberal Arts Colleges" (tie); #63 in "Best Value Schools"; #1 in "Top Performers on Social Mobility."

In The Princeton Review's The Best 390 Colleges: 2025 Edition, Thomas Aquinas College received the following rankings: No. 1 for "Most Conservative Students"; No. 4 for "Professors Get High Marks"; No. 5 for "Happiest Students" and "Most Religious Students"; and No. 7 for "Great Financial Aid".

== Notable alumni ==
- John Berg (1993), Superior General of the Priestly Fraternity of Saint Peter
- Peter Kwasniewski (1994), traditionalist Catholic writer and composer of sacred music.
- Mary Neumayr (1986), chairman of the White House Council on Environmental Quality
- Paul J. O'Reilly (1984), academic and current president of Thomas Aquinas College
- Pia de Solenni (1993), theologian who formerly served as the chancellor of the Diocese of Orange
