= Pia de Solenni =

American theologian

Pia de Solenni is an American theologian who formerly served as the chancellor of the Roman Catholic Diocese of Orange in California. Solenni is an alumna of Thomas Aquinas College where she earned a Bachelor of Arts degree in Liberal Arts-Great Books, and of the Pontifical University of Saint Thomas Aquinas, Angelicum, where she earned a Bachelor of Sacred Theology. Subsequently, she earned a doctorate in theology from the Pontifical University of the Holy Cross in Rome; for this work, she received the 2001 Award of the Pontifical Academies, presented by John Paul II. Dr. de Solenni has worked at the Family Research Council.

Her work has appeared in The Wall Street Journal, The Washington Post, and National Catholic Reporter, and she has appeared on CNN, ABC News, MSNBC, Hardball with Chris Matthews, The O’Reilly Factor, and other television programs.
