= Mike Boots =

American environmentalist

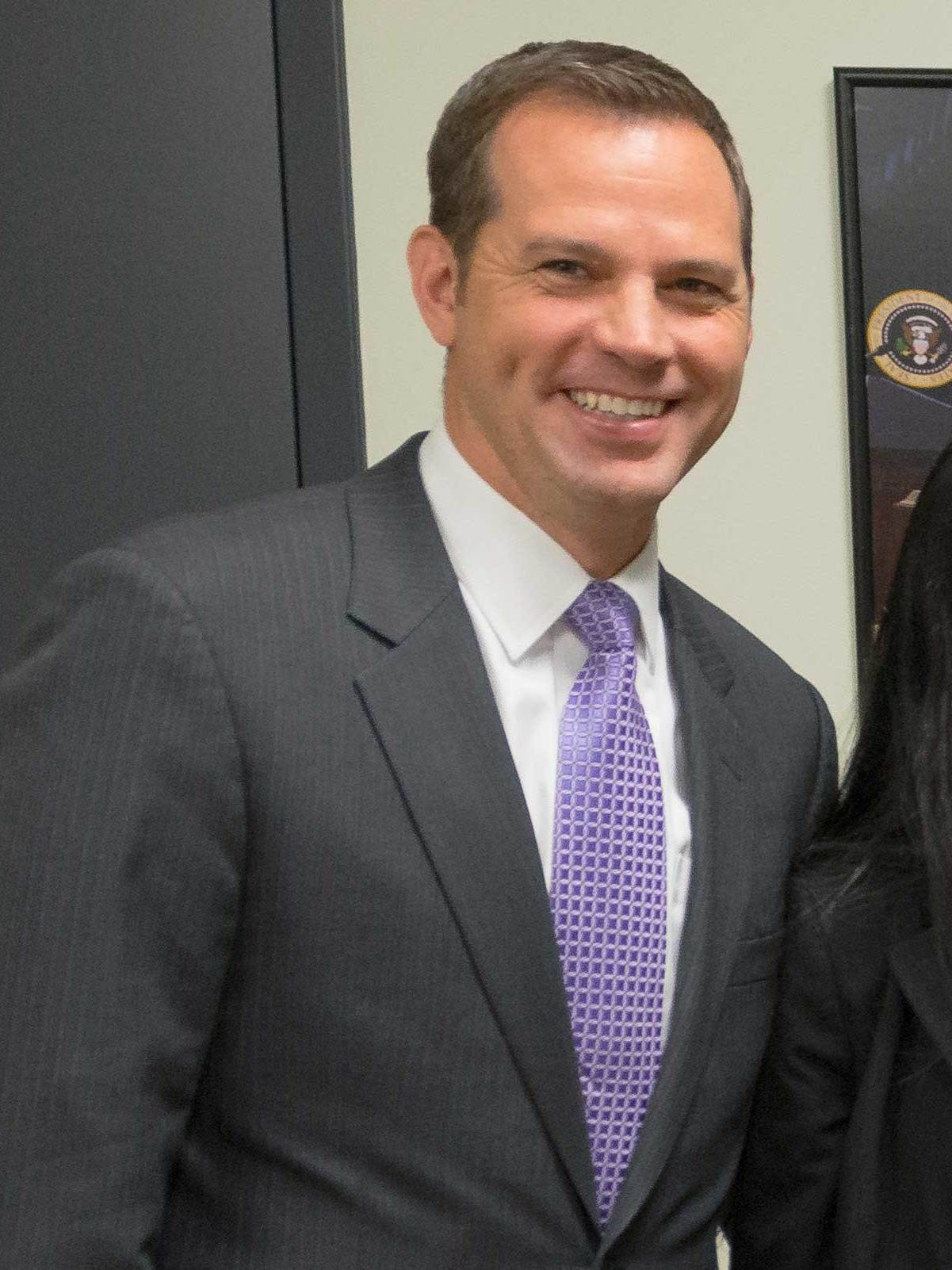

Chair of the Council on Environmental Quality
- Acting
- In office February 2014 – March 2015
- President: Barack Obama
- Preceded by: Nancy Sutley
- Succeeded by: Christy Goldfuss (acting)

Personal details
- Party: Democratic
- Education: University of California, Los Angeles (BA); Syracuse University (MPA)

Mike Boots is a former government official who served as Chair of the Council on Environmental Quality during part of Barack Obama's presidency. He served in the position from February 2014 – March 2015.

Boots grew up in Los Angeles and graduated with an M.P.A. from the Maxwell School of Citizenship and Public Affairs at Syracuse University and received a B.A. in Communications from the University of California Los Angeles.

Before joining the Obama administration's Council on Environmental Quality as a staffer at the beginning of the new administration's time in office he worked at environmental advocacy group SeaWeb.

Boots is the Executive Vice President at Bill Gates funded Breakthrough Energy.

Political offices
Preceded by Nancy Sutley	Chair of the Council on Environmental Quality; Acting; 2014–2015	Succeeded by Christy Goldfuss; Acting
