= Partnership for Responsible Growth =

American non-profit organization

- Abbreviation: PRG
- Formation: 2015; 11 years ago
- Founders: George T. Frampton, William C. Eacho, Walter C. Minnick
- Type: Non-profit
- Purpose: Advocates for environmentally sustainable business practices from an American conservative perspective
- Location: Washington DC, United States
- Region served: United States
- Services: Campaigns
- Website: partnershipforresponsiblegrowth.org

The Partnership for Responsible Growth is an American non-profit organization which advocates for environmentally sustainable business practices from an American conservative perspective.

== History ==
The Partnership for Responsible Growth was co-founded by George T. Frampton, Walt Minnick and William Eacho.

The Partnership stated in 2016 that 14% of the guest editorials on climate change in the Wall Street Journal presented the results of "mainstream climate science", while the majority did not. The Partnership also determined that none of the 201 editorials concerning climate change that were published in The Wall Street Journal since 1997 conceded that the burning of fossil fuels is the main cause of climate change.

In 2017, the Partnership for Responsible Growth advocated for a carbon tax in a series of advertisements.
