= Paul J. O'Reilly =

American college president (born 1961)

5th President of Thomas Aquinas College
- Incumbent
- Assumed office June 9, 2021
- Preceded by: Michael F. McLean

Personal details
- Born: 1961 (age 64–65) Belfast, Northern Ireland
- Spouse: Peggy O'Reilly (née Steichen)
- Education: Thomas Aquinas College (B.A.); Université Laval (M.A., Ph.D.)

Paul J. O'Reilly is an Irish scholar and academic who became the 5th president of Thomas Aquinas College on June 9, 2021.

== Early life and education ==
O'Reilly earned his Bachelor of Arts degree in liberal arts from Thomas Aquinas College, and his Master of Arts in philosophy and Ph.D. in philosophy from Université Laval.

O'Reilly grew up in war-torn Belfast during a period of political instability known as the Troubles. The second of eight children, O'Reilly moved to Canada with his family when he was 16. Several months after moving to Canada, his mother was killed in a car accident. O'Reilly and his siblings were then adopted by their uncle and aunt who lived in California.

Upon finishing high school, O'Reilly enrolled at Thomas Aquinas College, from which he graduated in 1984. He then pursued graduate studies in philosophy at the Université Laval, earning his Ph.D. in philosophy in 1989.

Prior to returning to Thomas Aquinas College as a professor, O'Reilly served as an instructor at St. Anselm College and as an adjunct lecturer at the Thomas More Institute.

== Thomas Aquinas College ==
O'Reilly began teaching at Thomas Aquinas College in 1989. In 2011, he was named the college's vice president for Development, and was appointed to be Thomas Aquinas College's 5th president by the Board of Governors in 2021.
