= Nancy Sutley =

American government official

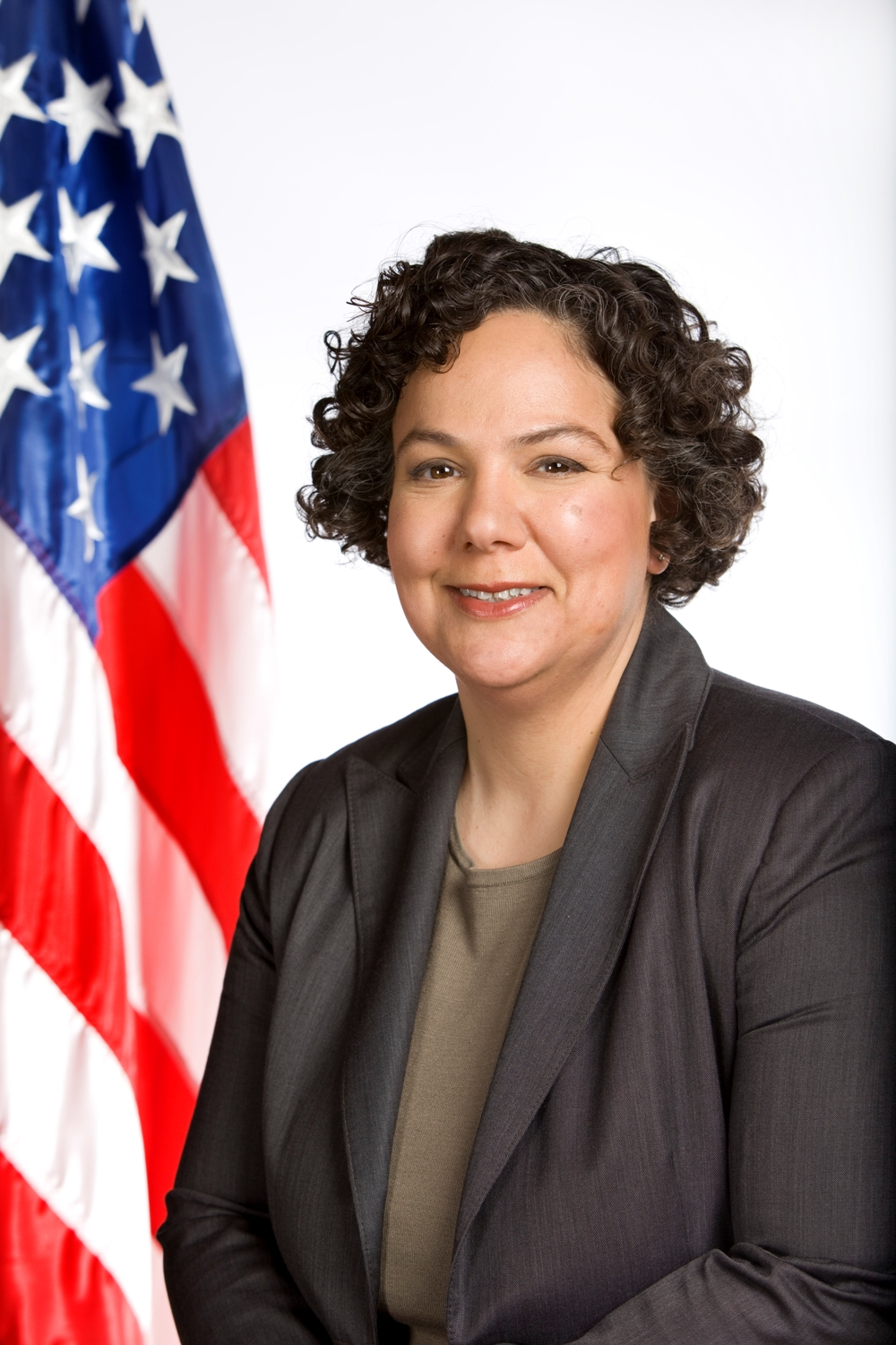

Chair of the Council on Environmental Quality
- In office January 22, 2009 – February 2014
- President: Barack Obama
- Preceded by: James Connaughton
- Succeeded by: Mike Boots (acting)

Personal details
- Born: April 20, 1962 (age 64) New York City, New York, U.S.
- Party: Democratic
- Education: Cornell University (BA); Harvard University (MPP)

Nancy Helen Sutley led the White House Council on Environmental Quality (CEQ) for five years during the administration of Barack Obama. She was unanimously confirmed for that post by the United States Senate on January 22, 2009. The CEQ coordinates federal environmental efforts and works with agencies other than White House offices in the development of environmental policies and initiatives; the chair serves as the principal environmental policy advisor to the president.

Prior to her leadership of the CEQ, Sutley served as deputy mayor for Energy and Environment in Los Angeles, California, and as Mayor Antonio Villaraigosa's appointment to the board of directors for the Metropolitan Water District of Southern California. Mayor Villaraigosa turned to her to achieve his goal of transforming L.A. into one of the greenest big cities in America. Sutley retrofitted 500 of the city's oldest buildings to make them more energy efficient and imposed environmental standards on new large communities.

Sutley announced that she would step down as Chair of the Council on Environmental Quality in February, 2014. In July 2014, she was appointed as Chief Sustainability and Economic Development Officer for the Los Angeles Department of Water and Power. For her work in sustainability, she was the recipient of the Trailblazer Award at Verdical Group's annual Net Zero Conference in 2019.

== Early life and education ==
Sutley was born April 20, 1962, in New York and was raised in Queens, New York. Her parents came to the United States from Argentina. She holds a master of public policy from the John F. Kennedy School of Government at Harvard University, and a B.A. degree in government from Cornell University.

== Career ==
From 1999 to 2003, Sutley served at the California Environmental Protection Agency as deputy secretary for policy and intergovernmental relations. During that period she was the top energy advisor to then Governor Gray Davis, and supported a requirement for Los Angeles to produce 20 percent of its power from renewable sources. She was also a member of the California State Water Resources Control Board, and a member of the Los Angeles Metropolitan Water District board of directors.

During the Clinton Administration, she was initially a senior policy advisor to the San Francisco regional administrator of the Environmental Protection Agency, and later served as special assistant to EPA administrator Carol Browner, in Washington, D.C. Later, Sutley served as a member of Hillary Clinton's Southern California Lesbian, Gay, Bisexual and Transgender steering committee. She was also a prominent supporter of Senator Clinton's primary campaign.

=== Council on Environmental Quality ===
Upon being appointed as chair of the Council on Environmental Quality in January 2009, Sutley was the first prominent gay person named to a senior role in the Obama administration.

As CEQ chair Sutley defined her mission as translating Obama's green agenda across government agencies, preserving natural heritage sites such as the Chesapeake Bay, the Everglades, and the Great Lakes, and putting science at the heart of decision-making. She promoted measures to conserve energy in the White House, such as installing low-flush toilets, adding sensors that automatically turn off lights in unused areas, and introducing the use of recycling bins. As part of the Department of Energy's demonstration project showing that American solar technologies are available, she led plans to install solar panels and a solar hot water heater on the roof of the White House.

Political offices
Preceded by James Connaughton	Chair of the Council on Environmental Quality; 2009–2014	Succeeded by Mike Boots; Acting
