= Google barges =

Group of four floating barges

Class overview
- Builders: C & C Marine and Repair
- Operators: Google
- Built: 2011–2013
- In service: 2013–2015

General characteristics
- Type: Barge
- Tonnage: 2164 tons
- Length: 249.6 feet (76.1 m)
- Beam: 72 feet (22 m)
- Depth: 16 feet (4.9 m)
- Notes: All 4 barges sold

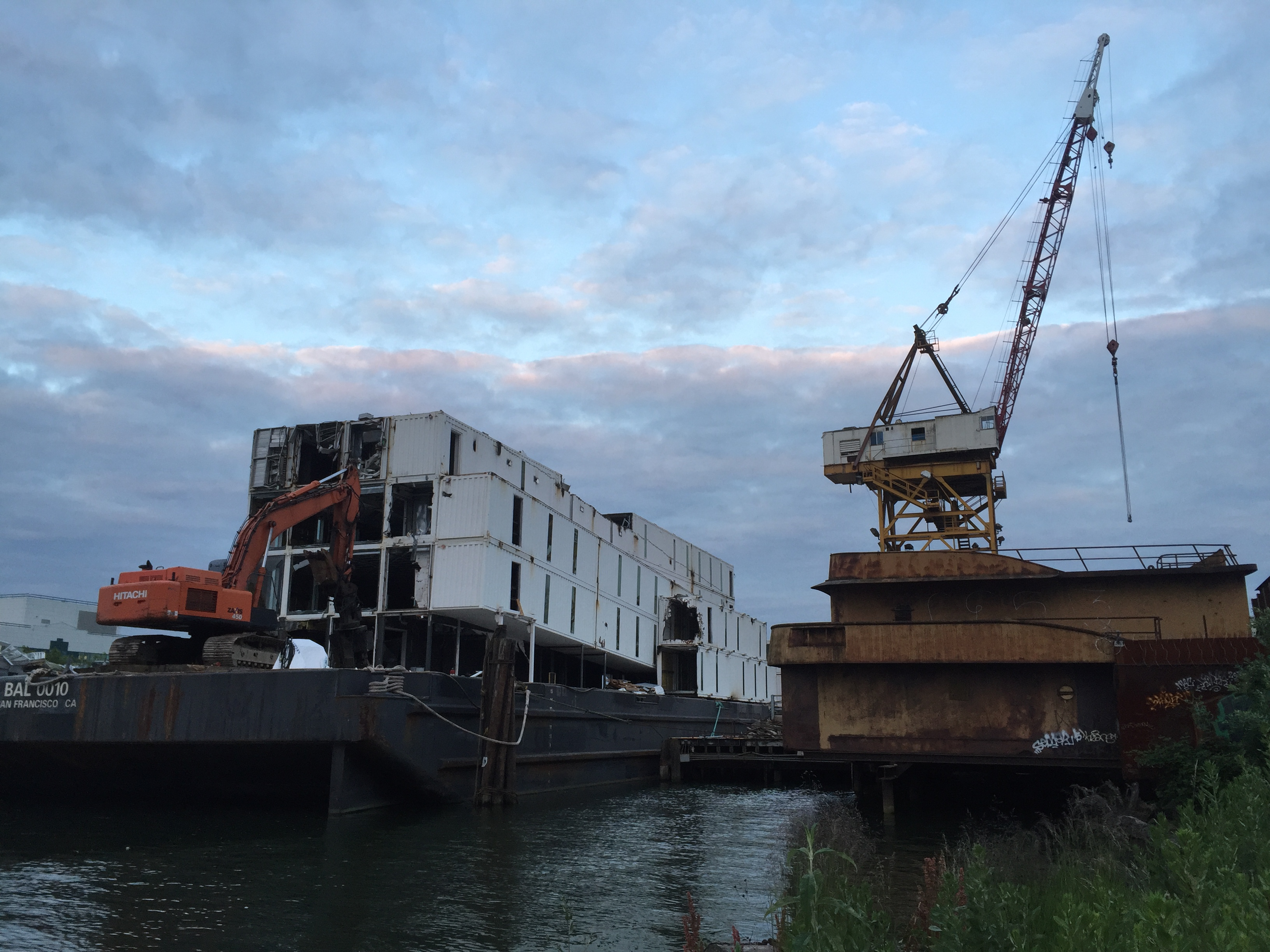
BAL0010 being demolished in Seattle, Washington, May 2016

The Google barges were a group of four floating barges built between 2010 and 2012, intended by Google to serve as "an interactive space where people can learn about new technology", possibly as luxury showrooms for Google Glass and other products on an invitation-only basis. Google halted work on the barges in late 2013 and began selling off the barges in 2014.

Two of the barges (one San Francisco barge and the former Portland barge) have or had a superstructure consisting of four stories of modern shipping containers welded together. Most of these containers have small slits that may serve as windows. Each superstructure had a container that slants down to ground level at a shallow angle. CBS sources claimed that the first three floors were intended to serve as a showroom, while the upper floor was designated as a party deck. The San Francisco structure had poles at the top that may be antennas, and was described as eventually being decorated with gigantic sails, and being moved among sites in the San Francisco Bay Area as a "temporary technology exhibit space" to "drive visitation to the waterfront".

Google may have built the structures on barges to avoid mandatory city building permits and public plans that may disclose their purpose. Ultimately, however, the time and cost of meeting federal maritime safety regulations may have prompted Google to abandon the project.

== Timeline ==
The earliest revealed barge, BAL0011, was built in 2011 and was first spotted in New London, Connecticut, where Turner Construction started construction of the superstructure in May 2013, according to The Day. Another barge of identical size was docked behind it, but no superstructure was visible, and workers hadn't been there in several weeks. The local Coast Guard refused to provide additional information on the barge, which led The Day to file a FOIA request with the Coast Guard for documents on the project. On July 1, 2013, Coast Guard Sector Long Island Sound held a conference call with Michael Tierney of Google Glass, where it was described that the vessel would travel from port to port, starting with New York Harbor. The containers had been shipped from San Francisco to be assembled in New London.

On October 9, 2013, BAL0011 was tugged to Portland, Maine, where it arrived the next day. As described by the Portland Press Herald, the superstructure is 4 containers long, wide and high, with one slanted container for access, for a total of 63 containers. Each of the upper three floors has doors at each end. Looking through some of the windows reveals windows on the other side, which suggests open interior space created by removing container walls. Cianbro Corp., a general services contractor, was scheduled to perform "a significant amount of interior work, including the installation of undisclosed technological equipment" on the structure, without offloading it from the barge. Peter Vigue, chairman and CEO of Cianbro, refused to discuss any details, but stated that the final destination of the barge was not Maine.

On October 25, CNET reporter Daniel Terdiman chronicled his visit to Treasure Island, San Francisco, a former U.S. Navy base, where a very similar barge (BAL0010) was moored, and where a construction facility called Hangar 3 is located. Satellite imagery showed shipping containers being amassed at Hangar 3, and later moved onto a floating barge moored alongside the adjacent pier. Terdiman uncovered the link to By And Large LLC (possibly simple rhyming slang for "barge"), a dummy company set up by Google. By And Large leased a total of 727,000 sq. ft for US$80,000/month plus a US$158,000 security deposit. A few hours later, Terdiman also linked the San Francisco barge to the Portland barge, identified as BAL0011.

On the same day, KPIX-TV/CBS cited sources close to Google claiming the barge would be a "marketing center for Google Glass" and once completed, would be towed to Fort Mason and open to public access. However, construction had stopped several weeks previously due to a lack of permits. A San Francisco Bay Conservation and Development Commission official (later identified in a video interview as executive director Larry Goldzband), was quoted as saying that Google discussed "hypothetical operations" but hadn't stated the exact purpose of the barge, which is necessary for the issuance of a permit for waterfront docking.

On October 30, CNBC's Josh Lipton reported that the Coast Guard confirmed the structure is associated with Google, but wouldn't comment further. Other US Coast Guard Sector San Francisco officials confirmed and later retracted the Google connection, while confirming that the Coast Guard did visit the Treasure Island barge.

On October 31, a Fort Mason official confirmed that Google had held initial discussions on docking a floating barge at a pier there.

On November 6, 2013, Google commented for the first time, sending an email statement to several news outlets stating,

Although it's still early days and things may change, we're exploring using the barge as an interactive space where people can learn about new technology.

The next day, the San Francisco Chronicle published a set of documents obtained under the Freedom of Information Act from the Port of San Francisco, which confirm the use of the Treasure Island barge as a "temporary technology exhibit space" by By and Large LLC. Google envisioned it to be an "unprecedented artistic structure", adorned with gigantic sails, to be moored for a month at a time at sites around the San Francisco Bay Area to "drive visitation to the waterfront". Later, the barge would be sailed to San Diego and other West Coast ports. The design was done by Gensler and LOT-EK.

On July 31, 2014, the Portland Press Herald reported that at least one of the barges had been sold, and that its superstructure was being scrapped.

In November 2014, the Wall Street Journal and other media outlets reported that the Google barge project had been cancelled due to costs associated with meeting federal maritime safety regulations. The reports indicate that this decision occurred in the fall of 2013, even as Google continued to release statements that the project was still in its early days.

== List of barges ==
All four barges were built by C & C Marine and Repair, have a hull depth of 16 ft, are owned by By and Large LLC (apparently a shell company set up by Google), were previously owned by Cibco Barge Line LLC, and list San Francisco as their hailing port.

List of barges presumed to be part of the project
Name	USCG Doc. No.	Type	Year built	Length	Breadth	Gross tonnage	Documentation issuance date	Previous vessel names	Notes
BAL0001 (sold)	1225102	Freight barge	2010	249.6 ft	72 ft	2164	September 12, 2013	CIB 721	No superstructure; container outfit and assembly started
BAL0010 (sold)	1233697	Passenger barge (inspected)	2011	260.1 ft	72.1 ft	2520	January 29, 2013	CIB 723	The barge that first attracted wide press coverage. Being demolished, May 2016
BAL0011 (sold)	1230780	Passenger barge (inspected)	2011	260.1 ft	72.1 ft	2520	February 12, 2013	CIB 722	Barge sold and towed from Portland, Maine
BAL0100 (sold)	1243694	Freight barge	2012	249.6 ft	72 ft	2164	September 12, 2013	CIB 724	No superstructure

The last four digits of the barge names are the binary numbers for '1', '2', '3' and '4': '0001', '0010', '0011' and '0100' respectively.

Three other freight barges of identical specifications built by C&C Marine and owned or previously owned by CIBCO BARGE LINE LLC exist – CIB 100, CIB 101, and CIB 725, all with a hailing port of New Orleans.

== Intended use ==
In the two weeks after CNET brought the barges' existence to light, Google refused to comment on their purpose. Eventually, Google stated that it was "exploring using the [San Francisco] barge as an interactive space where people can learn about new technology."

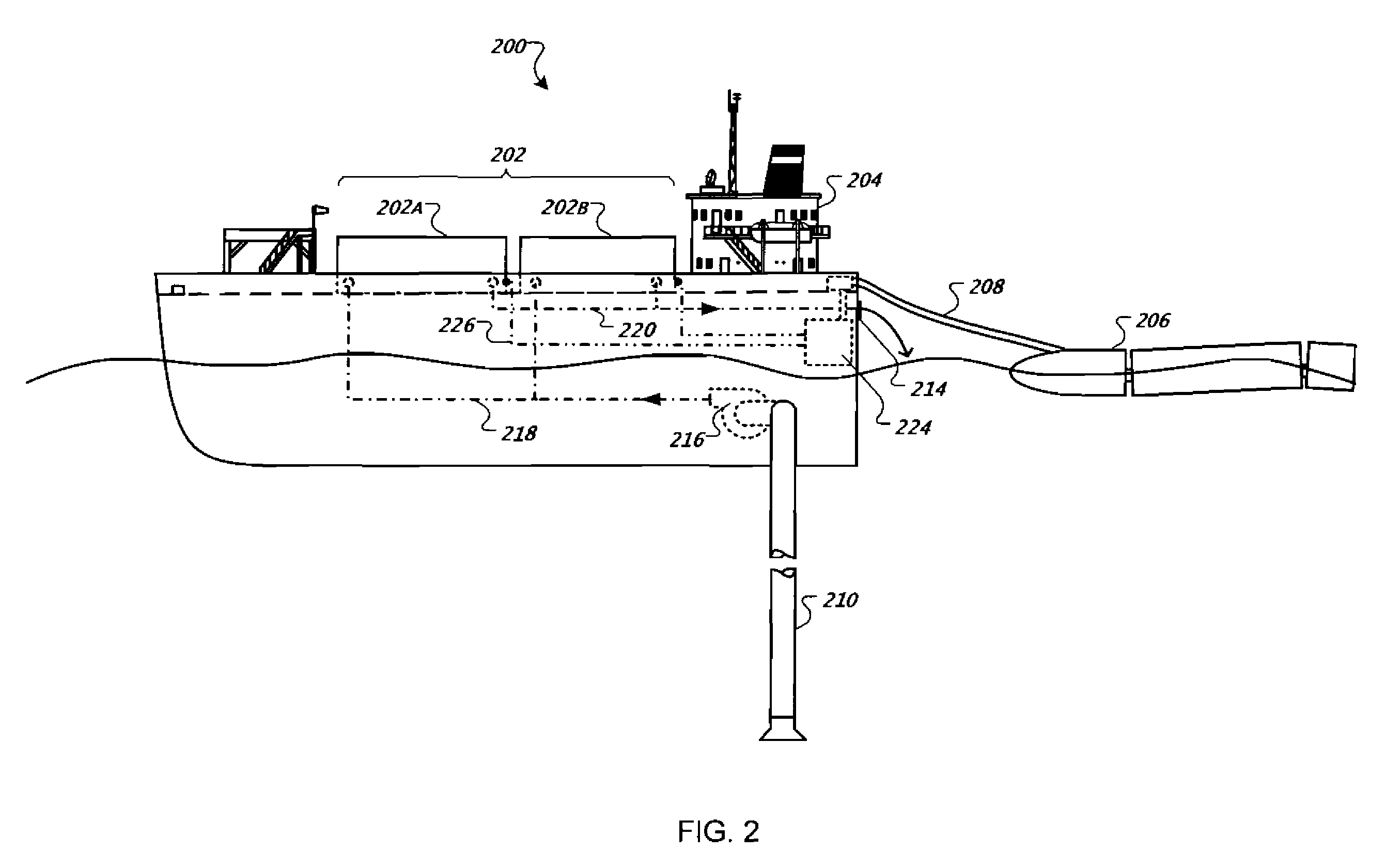
Fig. 2, US Patent 7,525,207, "Water-based data center" (Google Inc., 2009)

Before Google's statement, one speculative hypothesis was that the barges would be towed from city to city, along the coast and via rivers, to serve as stores for Google Glass. Arguments for this hypothesis included statements from sources close to Google and from Fort Mason officials, where Google discussed docking one of the barges. A Google Glass official, Michael Tierney, was documented as having discussed the project with the Coast Guard Sector Long Island Sound. CNET speculated that the unusual container-based structure was intended to contrast Apple's architectural style (usually open and filled with natural light). Arguments against this noted the lack of exits and the impracticality of building a store out of shipping containers that partition the interior space.

=== Data barges ===
Others hypothesized that the barges might serve as near-shore seafaring data centers, citing Google's patent, granted in 2009, for platforms and support systems floating three to seven miles offshore in water 50 to 70 meters (160 to 230 ft) deep, using wave energy for power and sea water for server cooling, grouped into floating platforms and support systems. Other supporting factors for this theory included Google's history of locating data centers in places with inexpensive cooling, their previous use of seawater for natural cooling at its Hamina, Finland data center, the absence of windows in the containers (making them less suitable for human habitation), and Google's history of secrecy regarding its data centers, a core competitive advantage. CNET quoted an independent marine engineer who was involved in a project to build a water-based backup data center for Google several years ago as saying that Google may be completing that project.
