= Kofi Annan =

UN Secretary-General from 1997 to 2006

Busumuru Kofi Annan
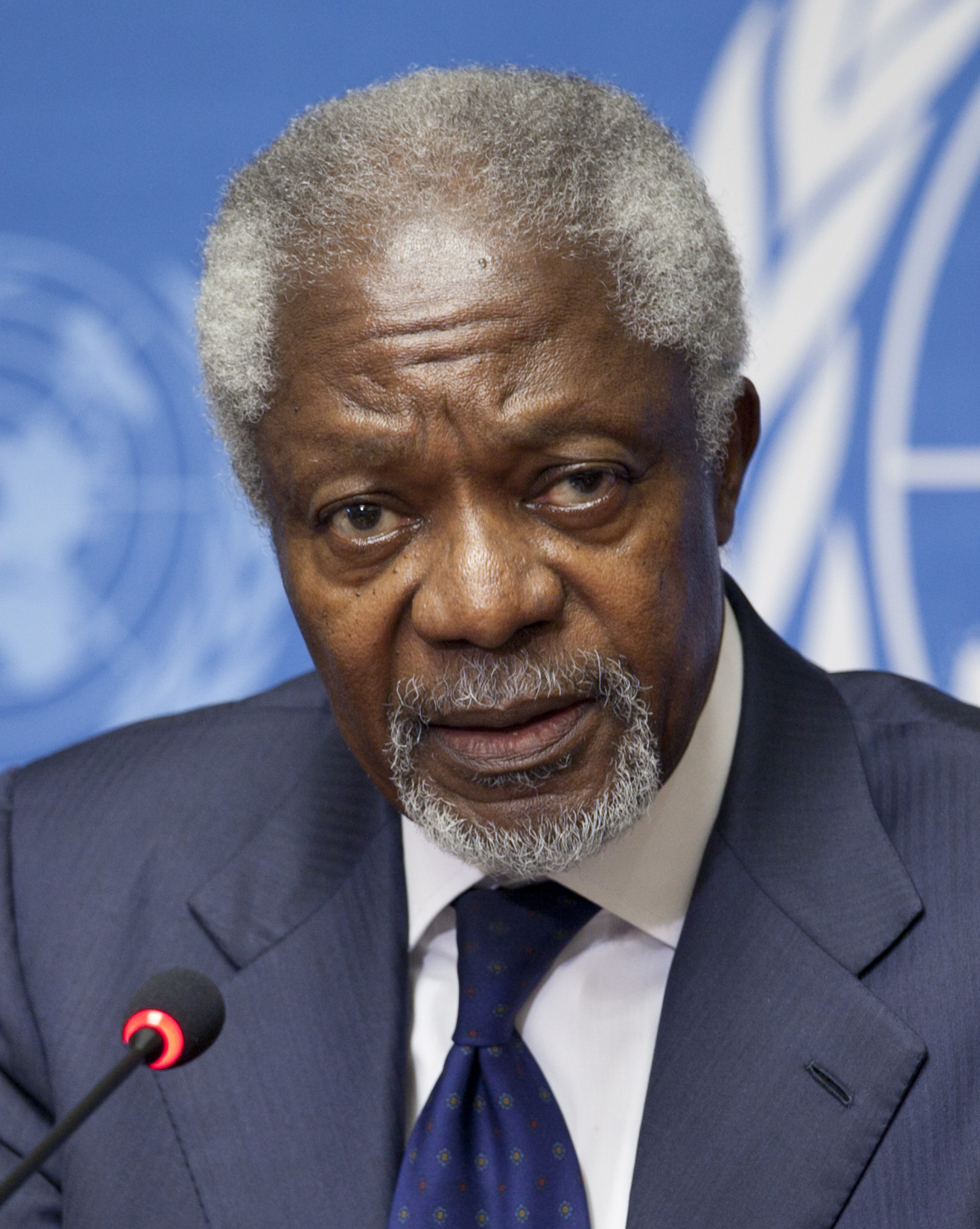
- Annan in 2012

7th Secretary-General of the United Nations
- In office 1 January 1997 – 31 December 2006
- Deputy: Louise Fréchette; Mark Malloch Brown
- Preceded by: Boutros Boutros-Ghali
- Succeeded by: Ban Ki-moon

UN and Arab League Envoy to Syria
- In office 23 February 2012 – 31 August 2012
- Secretary-General: Ban Ki-moon (UN); Nabil Elaraby (League)
- Preceded by: Position established
- Succeeded by: Lakhdar Brahimi

Under-Secretary-General for Peacekeeping Operations
- In office 1 March 1993 – 31 December 1996
- Secretary-General: Boutros Boutros-Ghali
- Preceded by: Marrack Goulding
- Succeeded by: Bernard Miyet

Chancellor of the University of Ghana
- In office 2008 – 1 August 2018
- Preceded by: Emmanuel Noi Omaboe
- Succeeded by: Mary Chinery-Hesse

Personal details
- Born: 8 April 1938 Kumasi, Gold Coast
- Died: 18 August 2018 (aged 80) Bern, Switzerland
- Spouses: Titi Alakija (m. 1965; div. 1983) Nane Lagergren (m. 1984)
- Children: 3, including Kojo
- Relatives: Kobina Annan (brother); Adeyemo Alakija (father-in-law); Nina Lagergren (mother-in-law); Aduke Alakija (sister-in-law)
- Education: Kwame Nkrumah University of Science and Technology; Macalester College (BA); Graduate Institute of International and Development Studies; Massachusetts Institute of Technology (MS)
- Occupation: Diplomat; economist
- Awards: Full list
- Website: Foundation

Kofi Atta Annan (Note: /ˈkoʊfi ˈænæn/ KOH-fee AN-an, US also /- ˈɑːnɑːn/ - AH-nahn;) (8 April 1938 – 18 August 2018) was a Ghanaian diplomat and statesman who served as the seventh secretary-general of the United Nations from 1997 to 2006. Annan and the UN were the co-recipients of the 2001 Nobel Peace Prize. He was the founder and chairman of the Kofi Annan Foundation, as well as chairman of The Elders, an international organisation founded by Nelson Mandela.

Annan joined the United Nations in 1962, working for the World Health Organization's Geneva office. He went on to work in several capacities at the UN Headquarters, including serving as the under-secretary-general for peacekeeping between March 1992 and December 1996. He was appointed secretary-general on 13 December 1996 by the Security Council and later confirmed by the General Assembly, making him the first officeholder to be elected from the UN staff itself. He was re-elected for a second term in 2001 and was succeeded as secretary-general by Ban Ki-moon in 2007.

As secretary-general, Annan reformed the UN bureaucracy, worked to combat HIV/AIDS (especially in Africa) and launched the UN Global Compact. He was criticised for not expanding the Security Council and faced calls for his resignation after an investigation into the Oil-for-Food Programme, but was largely exonerated of personal corruption. After the end of his term as secretary-general, he founded the Kofi Annan Foundation in 2007 to work on international development. In 2012, Annan was the UN–Arab League Joint Special Representative for Syria to help find a resolution to the Syrian civil war. Annan quit after becoming frustrated with the UN's lack of progress with regard to conflict resolution. In September 2016, Annan was appointed to lead a UN commission to investigate the Rohingya crisis. He died in 2018 and was given a state funeral.

== Early life and education ==
Kofi Annan was born in Kumasi in the Gold Coast (Ghana) on 8 April 1938. His twin sister Efua Atta, who died in 1991, shared the middle name Atta, which in the Akan language means "twin". Annan and his sister were born into one of the country's Fante aristocratic families; both of their grandfathers and their uncle were Fante paramount chiefs, and their brother Kobina would go on to become Ghana's ambassador to Morocco.

In the Akan names tradition, some children are named according to the day of the week they were born, sometimes in relation to how many children precede them. Kofi in Akan is the name that corresponds with Friday, the day on which Annan was born. The last name Annan in Fante means fourth-born child. Annan said that his surname rhymes with "cannon" in English.

From 1954 to 1957, Annan attended the elite Mfantsipim, an all-boys Methodist boarding school in Cape Coast founded in the 1870s. Annan said that the school taught him that "suffering anywhere, concerns people everywhere". In 1957, the year Annan graduated from Mfantsipim, the Gold Coast gained independence from the UK and began using the name "Ghana".

In 1958, Annan began studying economics at the Kumasi College of Science and Technology, (the Kwame Nkrumah University of Science and Technology of Ghana). He received a Ford Foundation grant, enabling him to complete his undergraduate studies in economics at Macalester College in Saint Paul, Minnesota, US, in 1961. During his time at Macalester, Annan was known for his quiet leadership and cross-cultural perspective, qualities that later defined his diplomatic career. Annan then completed a diplôme d'études approfondies DEA degree in International Relations at the Graduate Institute of International and Development Studies in Geneva, Switzerland, from 1961 to 1962. After some years of work experience, he studied at the MIT Sloan School of Management (1971–72) in the Sloan Fellows program and earned a master's degree in management.

== Diplomatic career ==
In 1962, Annan started working as a budget officer for the World Health Organization, an agency of the United Nations (UN). From 1974 to 1976, he worked as a manager of the state-owned Ghana Tourist Development Company in Accra. In 1980 he became the head of personnel for the office of the UN High Commission for Refugees (UNHCR) in Geneva. Between 1981 and 1983, he was a member of the Governing Board of the International School of Geneva. In 1983 he became the director of administrative management services of the UN Secretariat in New York. In 1987, Annan was appointed as an assistant secretary-general for Human Resources Management and Security Coordinator for the UN system. In 1990, he became Assistant Secretary-General for Program Planning, Budget and Finance, and Control.

When Secretary-General Boutros Boutros-Ghali established the Department of Peacekeeping Operations (DPKO) in 1992, Annan was appointed to the new department as Deputy to then Under-Secretary-General Marrack Goulding. Annan replaced Goulding in March 1993 as Under-Secretary-General of that department after American officials persuaded Boutros-Ghali that Annan was more flexible and more aligned with the role that the Pentagon expected of UN peacekeepers in Somalia. On 29 August 1995, while Boutros-Ghali was unreachable on an aeroplane, Annan instructed United Nations officials to "relinquish for a limited period of time their authority to veto air strikes in Bosnia". This move allowed NATO forces to conduct Operation Deliberate Force and made him a favourite of the United States. According to Richard Holbrooke, Annan's "gutsy performance" convinced the United States that he would be a good replacement for Boutros-Ghali.

He was appointed a special representative of the Secretary-General to the former Yugoslavia, serving from November 1995 to March 1996.

=== Criticism ===
In 2003, retired Canadian general Roméo Dallaire, who was force commander of the United Nations Assistance Mission for Rwanda (UNAMIR), claimed that Annan was overly passive in his response to the imminent genocide. In his book Shake Hands with the Devil: The Failure of Humanity in Rwanda (2003), Dallaire asserted that Annan held back UN troops from intervening to settle the conflict and from providing more logistical and material support. Dallaire claimed that Annan failed to respond to his repeated faxes asking for access to a weapons depository; such weapons could have helped Dallaire defend the endangered Tutsis. In 2004, ten years after the genocide in which an estimated 800,000 people were killed, Annan said: "I could and should have done more to sound the alarm and rally support."

External videos
- After Words interview with Annan on Interventions, 9 September 2012, C-SPAN

In his book Interventions: A Life in War and Peace, Annan again argued that the United Nations Department of Peacekeeping Operations could have made better use of the media to raise awareness of the violence in Rwanda and put pressure on governments to provide the troops necessary for an intervention. Annan explained that the events in Somalia and the collapse of the UNOSOM II mission fostered a hesitation among UN member states to approve robust peacekeeping operations. As a result, when the UNAMIR mission was approved just days after the battle, the resulting force lacked the troop levels, resources and mandate to operate effectively.

== United Nations Secretary-General (1997–2006) ==
=== Appointment ===
In 1996, Secretary-General Boutros Boutros-Ghali ran unopposed for a second term. Although he won 14 of the 15 votes on the Security Council, he was vetoed by the United States. After four deadlocked meetings of the Security Council, Boutros-Ghali suspended his candidacy, becoming the only secretary-general ever to be denied a second term. Annan was the leading candidate to replace him, beating Amara Essy by one vote in the first round. However, France vetoed Annan four times before finally abstaining. The UN Security Council recommended Annan on 13 December 1996. Confirmed four days later by the vote of the General Assembly, he started his first term as secretary-general on 1 January 1997.

Due to Boutros-Ghali's overthrow, a second Annan term would give Africa the office of Secretary-General for three consecutive terms. In 2001, the Asia-Pacific Group agreed to support Annan for a second term in return for the African Group's support for an Asian secretary-general in the 2006 selection. The Security Council recommended Annan for a second term on 27 June 2001, and the General Assembly approved his reappointment on 29 June 2001.

=== Activities ===
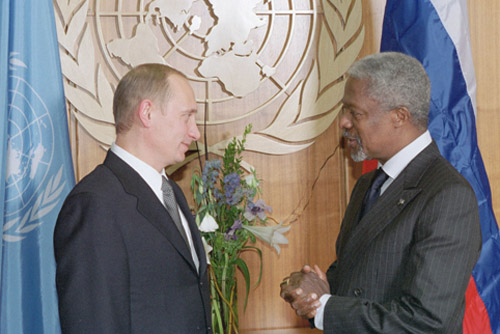
Annan with Russian president Vladimir Putin at United Nations Headquarters in New York City, 2001

==== Recommendations for UN reform ====
Soon after taking office in 1997, Annan released two reports on management reform. On 17 March 1997, the report Management and Organisational Measures (A/51/829) introduced new management mechanisms through the establishment of a cabinet-style body to assist him and the UN's activities in accordance with four core missions. A comprehensive reform agenda was issued on 14 July 1997 titled Renewing the United Nations: A Programme for Reform (A/51/950). Key proposals included the introduction of strategic management to strengthen unity of purpose, the establishment of the position of deputy secretary-general, a 10-per cent reduction in posts, a reduction in administrative costs, the consolidation of the UN at the country level, and reaching out to civil society and the private sector as partners. Annan also proposed to hold a Millennium Summit in 2000. After years of research, Annan presented a progress report, In Larger Freedom, to the UN General Assembly on 21 March 2005. Annan recommended Security Council expansion and a host of other UN reforms.

On 31 January 2006, Annan outlined his vision for a comprehensive and extensive reform of the UN in a policy speech to the United Nations Association UK. The speech, delivered at Central Hall, Westminster, also marked the 60th anniversary of the first meetings of the General Assembly and Security Council.

On 7 March 2006, he presented to the General Assembly his proposals for a fundamental overhaul of the United Nations Secretariat. The reform report is titled Investing in the United Nations, For a Stronger Organization Worldwide.

On 30 March 2006, he presented to the General Assembly his analysis and recommendations for updating the entire work programme of the United Nations Secretariat. The reform report is titled Mandating and Delivering: Analysis and Recommendations to Facilitate the Review of Mandates.

Regarding the UN Human Rights Council, Annan said "declining credibility" had "cast a shadow on the reputation of the United Nations system. Unless we re-make our human rights machinery, we may be unable to renew public confidence in the United Nations itself." He believed that, despite its flaws, the council could do good.

In March 2000, Annan appointed the Panel on United Nations Peace Operations to assess the shortcomings of the then existing system and to make specific and realistic recommendations for change. The panel was composed of individuals experienced in conflict prevention, peacekeeping and peacebuilding. The report it produced, which became known as the Brahimi Report, after the chair of the Panel Lakhdar Brahimi, called for "renewed political commitment on the part of Member States, significant institutional change, and increased financial support". The Panel further noted that to be effective, UN peacekeeping operations must be adequately resourced and equipped, and operate under clear, credible and achievable mandates. In a letter transmitting the report to the General Assembly and Security Council, Annan stated that the Panel's recommendations were essential to making the United Nations truly credible as a force for peace. Later that same year, the Security Council adopted several provisions relating to peacekeeping following the report, in Resolution 1327.

==== Millennium Development Goals ====
In 2000, Annan issued a report titled We the Peoples: the Role of the United Nations in the 21st Century. The report called for member states to "put people at the centre of everything we do": "No calling is more noble, and no responsibility greater, than that of enabling men, women and children, in cities and villages around the world, to make their lives better."

In the final chapter of the report, Annan called to "free our fellow men and women from the abject and dehumanizing poverty in which more than 1 billion of them are currently confined".

At the Millennium Summit in September 2000, national leaders adopted the Millennium Declaration, which the United Nations Secretariat subsequently implemented as the Millennium Development Goals in 2001.

==== United Nations Information Technology Service ====
Within the We the Peoples document, Annan suggested the establishment of a United Nations Information Technology Service (UNITeS), a consortium of high-tech volunteer corps, including NetCorps Canada and Net Corps America, which United Nations Volunteers (UNV) would coordinate. In the "Report of the high-level panel of experts on information and communication technology", suggesting a UN ICT Task Force, the panel welcomed the establishment of UNITeS. It made suggestions on its configuration and implementation strategy, including that ICT4D volunteering opportunities make mobilising "national human resources" (local ICT experts) within developing countries a priority for both men and women. The initiative was launched at the UNV and was active from February 2001 to February 2005. Initiative staff and volunteers participated in the World Summit on the Information Society (WSIS) in Geneva in December 2003.

==== United Nations Global Compact ====
In an address to the World Economic Forum on 31 January 1999, Annan argued that the "goals of the United Nations and those of business can, indeed, be mutually supportive" and proposed that the private sector and the United Nations initiate "a global compact of shared values and principles, which will give a human face to the global market".

On 26 July 2000, the United Nations Global Compact was officially launched at UN headquarters in New York. It is a principle-based framework for businesses which aims to "[c]atalyse actions in support of broader UN goals, such as the Millennium Development Goals (MDGs)". The Compact established ten core principles in the areas of human rights, labour, the environment and anti-corruption. Under the Compact, companies commit to the ten principles and are brought together with UN agencies, labour groups and civil society to implement them effectively.

==== Establishment of The Global Fund ====
Towards the end of the 1990s, increased awareness of the destructive potential of epidemics such as HIV/AIDS pushed public health issues to the top of the global development agenda. In April 2001, Annan issued a five-point "Call to Action" to address the HIV/AIDS pandemic. Stating it was a "personal priority", Annan proposed the establishment of a Global AIDS and Health Fund, "dedicated to the battle against HIV/AIDS and other infectious diseases", to stimulate the increased international spending needed to help developing countries confront the HIV/AIDS crisis. In June of that year, the General Assembly of the United Nations committed to creating such a fund during a special session on AIDS, and the permanent secretariat of the Global Fund was subsequently established in January 2002.

==== Responsibility to Protect ====
Following the failure of Annan and the international community to intervene in the genocide in Rwanda and in Srebrenica, Annan asked whether the international community had an obligation in such situations to intervene to protect civilian populations. In a speech to the General Assembly on 20 September 1999, "to address the prospects for human security and intervention in the next century", Annan argued that individual sovereignty—the protections afforded by the Declaration of Human Rights and the Charter of the UN—was being strengthened, while the notion of state sovereignty was being redefined by globalisation and international co-operation. As a result, the UN and its member states had to consider a willingness to act to prevent conflict and civilian suffering, a dilemma between "two concepts of sovereignty" that Annan also presented in a preceding article in The Economist on 16 September 1999.

In the March 2000 Millennium Report to the UN, Annan asked: "If humanitarian intervention is, indeed, an unacceptable assault on sovereignty, how should we respond to a Rwanda, to a Srebrenica – to gross and systematic violations of human rights that offend every precept of our common humanity?"

In September 2001, the Canadian government established an ad hoc committee to address this balance between state sovereignty and humanitarian intervention. The International Commission on Intervention and State Sovereignty published its final report in 2001, which focused not on the right of states to intervene but on a responsibility to protect populations at risk. The report moved beyond military intervention, arguing that various diplomatic and humanitarian actions could also be utilised to protect civilian populations.

In 2005, Annan included the doctrine of "Responsibility to Protect" (RtoP) in his report In Larger Freedom. When the UN General Assembly endorsed that report, it amounted to the first formal endorsement by UN member states of the doctrine of RtoP.

==== Iraq ====
In the years after 1998, when UNSCOM was expelled by the government of Saddam Hussein, and during the Iraq disarmament crisis, in which the United States blamed UNSCOM and former IAEA director Hans Blix for failing to disarm Iraq properly, former UNSCOM chief weapons inspector Scott Ritter blamed Annan for being slow and ineffective in enforcing Security Council resolutions on Iraq and being overtly submissive to the demands of the Clinton administration for regime removal and inspection of sites, often presidential palaces, that were not mandated in any resolution and were of questionable intelligence value, severely hampering UNSCOM's ability to co-operate with the Iraqi government and contributing to their expulsion from the country. Ritter also claimed that Annan regularly interfered with the work of the inspectors and diluted the chain of command by trying to micromanage all of the activities of UNSCOM, which caused intelligence processing (and the resulting inspections) to be backed up and caused confusion with the Iraqis as to who was in charge and as a result, they generally refused to take orders from Ritter or Rolf Ekéus without explicit approval from Annan, which could have taken days, if not weeks. He later believed Annan was oblivious that the Iraqis took advantage of this to delay inspections. He claimed that on one occasion, Annan refused to implement a no-notice inspection of the Iraqi Special Security Organization (SSO) headquarters and instead tried to negotiate access. Still, the negotiation took nearly six weeks, giving the Iraqis more than enough time to clean the site.

During the build-up to the 2003 invasion of Iraq, Annan called on the United States and the United Kingdom not to invade without the support of the United Nations. In a September 2004 interview on the BBC, when questioned about the legal authority for the invasion, Annan said he believed it was not in conformity with the UN charter and was illegal.

==== Other diplomatic activities ====
In 1998, Annan was deeply involved in supporting the transition from military to civilian rule in Nigeria. The following year, he supported the efforts of East Timor to secure independence from Indonesia. In 2000, he was responsible for certifying Israel's withdrawal from Lebanon, and in 2006, he led talks in New York between the presidents of Cameroon and Nigeria, which led to a settlement of the dispute between the two countries over the Bakassi peninsula.

Annan and Iranian president Mahmoud Ahmadinejad disagreed sharply on Iran's nuclear program, on an Iranian exhibition of cartoons mocking the Holocaust, and on the then-upcoming International Conference to Review the Global Vision of the Holocaust, an Iranian Holocaust denial conference in 2006. During a visit to Iran instigated by continued Iranian uranium enrichment, Annan said: "I think the tragedy of the Holocaust is an undeniable historical fact and we should really accept that fact and teach people what happened in World War II and ensure it is never repeated".

Annan supported sending a UN peacekeeping mission to Darfur, Sudan. He worked with the government of Sudan to accept a transfer of power from the African Union peacekeeping mission to a UN one. Annan also worked with several Arab and Muslim countries on women's rights and other topics.

Beginning in 1998, Annan convened an annual UN "Security Council Retreat" with the 15 states' council representatives. It was held at the Rockefeller Brothers Fund (RBF) Conference Center at the Rockefeller family estate in Pocantico Hills, New York, and was sponsored by both the RBF and the UN.

==== Lubbers sexual-harassment investigation ====
In June 2004, Annan was given a copy of the Office of Internal Oversight Services (OIOS) report on the complaint brought by four female workers against Ruud Lubbers, UN High Commissioner for Refugees, for sexual harassment, abuse of authority, and retaliation. The report also reviewed a long-serving staff member's allegations of sexual harassment and misconduct against Werner Blatter, director of UNHCR personnel. The investigation found Lubbers guilty of sexual harassment; no mention was made publicly of the other charge against a senior official or two subsequent complaints filed later that year. During the official investigation, Lubbers wrote a letter which some considered a threat to the female worker who had brought the charges. On 15 July 2004, Annan cleared Lubbers of the accusations, saying they were not substantial enough legally. The internal UN–OIOS report on Lubbers was leaked, and sections accompanied by an article by Kate Holt were published in a British newspaper. In February 2005, Lubbers resigned as head of the UN refugee agency, saying he wanted to relieve political pressure on Annan.

==== Oil-for-Food scandal ====
In December 2004, reports surfaced that the Secretary-General's son Kojo Annan received payments from the Swiss company Cotecna Inspection SA, which had won a lucrative contract under the UN Oil-for-Food Programme. Kofi Annan called for an investigation to look into the allegations. On 11 November 2005, The Sunday Times agreed to apologise and pay a substantial sum in damages to Kojo Annan, accepting that the allegations were untrue.

Annan appointed the Independent Inquiry Committee, which was led by former US Federal Reserve chairman Paul Volcker, then the director of the United Nations Association of the US. In his first interview with the Inquiry Committee, Annan denied meeting with Cotecna. Later in the inquiry, he recalled having met with Cotecna's chief executive Elie-Georges Massey twice. In a final report issued on 27 October, the committee found insufficient evidence to indict Annan on any illegal actions but did find fault with Benon Sevan, an Armenian-Cypriot national who had worked for the UN for about 40 years. Appointed by Annan to the Oil-For-Food role, Sevan repeatedly asked Iraqis for allocations of oil to the African Middle East Petroleum Company. Sevan's behaviour was "ethically improper", Volcker said to reporters. Sevan repeatedly denied the charges and argued that he was being made a "scapegoat". The Volcker report was highly critical of the UN management structure and the Security Council oversight. It strongly recommended a new chief operating officer (COO) position to handle the fiscal and administrative responsibilities then under the Secretary-General's office. The report listed the Western and Middle Eastern companies that had benefited illegally from the program.

=== Nobel Peace Prize ===
In 2001, its centennial year, the Nobel Committee decided that the Peace Prize was to be divided between the UN and Annan. They were awarded the Peace Prize "for their work for a better organized and more peaceful world", having revitalised the UN and prioritised human rights. The Nobel Committee also recognised his commitment to the struggle to contain the spread of HIV in Africa and his declared opposition to international terrorism.

Soon after Annan was awarded the Peace Prize, he was given a chieftaincy title by the Asantehene of Asanteman. The honour was conferred upon him for his "[selfless] contributions to humanity and promotion of peace throughout the world".

=== Relations between the United States and the UN ===
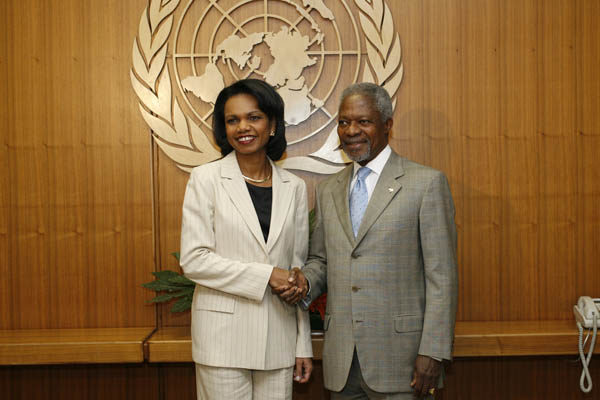
Annan with US secretary of state Condoleezza Rice in 2006

Annan defended his deputy secretary-general Mark Malloch Brown, who openly criticised the United States in a speech on 6 June 2006: "[T]he prevailing practice of seeking to use the UN almost by stealth as a diplomatic tool while failing to stand up for it against its domestic critics is simply not sustainable. You will lose the UN one way or another. [...] [That] the US is constructively engaged with the UN [...] is not well known or understood, in part because much of the public discourse that reaches the US heartland has been largely abandoned to its loudest detractors such as Rush Limbaugh and Fox News." Malloch later said his talk was a "sincere and constructive critique of U.S. policy toward the U.N. by a friend and admirer".

The talk was unusual because it violated the unofficial policy of not having top officials publicly criticise member nations. The interim US ambassador John Bolton, appointed by President George W. Bush, was reported to have told Annan on the phone: "I've known you since 1989 and I'm telling you this is the worst mistake by a senior UN official that I have seen in that entire time." Observers from other nations supported Malloch's view that conservative politicians in the US prevented many citizens from understanding the benefits of US involvement in the UN.

=== Farewell addresses ===
External videos
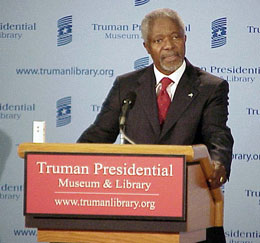
- Annan speaking at the Harry S. Truman Presidential Library and Museum
- Farewell Address by Kofi Annan, 11 December 2006, C-SPAN

On 19 September 2006, Annan gave a farewell address to world leaders gathered at the UN headquarters in New York in anticipation of his retirement on 31 December. In the speech, he outlined three major problems of "an unjust world economy, world disorder, and widespread contempt for human rights and the rule of law", which he believed "have not resolved, but sharpened" during his time as secretary-general. He also pointed to violence in Africa and the Arab–Israeli conflict as two major issues warranting attention.

On 11 December 2006, in his final speech as secretary-general, delivered at the Harry S. Truman Presidential Library in Independence, Missouri, Annan recalled President Truman's leadership in the founding of the United Nations. He called for the United States to return to Truman's multilateralist foreign policies and to follow Truman's doctrine that "the responsibility of the great states is to serve and not dominate the peoples of the world". He also said that the United States must maintain its commitment to human rights, "including in the struggle against terrorism".

== Post-UN career ==
After he served as UN secretary-general, Annan took up residence in Geneva and worked in a leading capacity on various international humanitarian endeavours.

=== Kofi Annan Foundation ===
In 2007, Annan established the Kofi Annan Foundation, an independent, not-for-profit organisation that "works to promote better global governance and strengthen the capacities of people and countries to achieve a fairer, more secure world".

The organisation was founded on the principles that fair and peaceful societies rest on three pillars: peace and security, sustainable development, and human rights and the rule of law, and they have made it their mission to mobilise the leadership and the political resolve needed to tackle threats to these three pillars ranging from violent conflict to flawed elections and climate change, to achieve "a fairer, more peaceful world".

The Foundation provides the analytical, communication and co-ordination capacities needed to ensure that these objectives are achieved. Annan's contribution to peace worldwide is delivered through mediation, political mentoring, advocacy and advice. Through his engagement, Annan aimed to strengthen local and international conflict resolution capabilities. The Foundation provides the analytical and logistical support to facilitate this in cooperation with relevant local, regional and international actors. The Foundation works mainly through private diplomacy, with Annan providing informal counsel and participating in discreet diplomatic initiatives to avert or resolve crises. He was often asked to intercede in crises, sometimes as an impartial, independent mediator, sometimes as a special envoy of the international community. In recent years he had provided such counsel to Burkina Faso, Kenya, Myanmar, Senegal, Iraq and Colombia.

=== Kenya National Dialogue and Reconciliation Process ===
Following the outbreak of violence after the 2007 presidential elections in Kenya, the African Union (AU) established the Panel of Eminent African Personalities to assist in finding a peaceful solution to the crisis. Annan was appointed as chair of the panel, to lead it with Benjamin Mkapa, former president of Tanzania; and humanitarian Graça Machel, the former first lady of Mozambique and South Africa.

The panel managed to convince the two principal parties to the conflict, Kenyan president Mwai Kibaki's Party of National Unity (PNU) and Raila Odinga's Orange Democratic Movement (ODM), to participate in the Kenya National Dialogue and Reconciliation Process (KNDR). Over the course of 41 days of negotiations, several agreements regarding taking actions to stop the violence and to remedy its consequences were signed. On 28 February, President Kibaki and Prime Minister Odinga signed a coalition government agreement.

=== Joint Special Envoy for Syria ===
On 23 February 2012, Annan was appointed as the UN and Arab League joint special envoy to Syria in an attempt to end the civil war taking place. He developed a six-point plan for peace:

1. commit to work with the Envoy in an inclusive Syrian-led political process to address the legitimate aspirations and concerns of the Syrian people, and, to this end, commit to appoint an empowered interlocutor when invited to do so by the Envoy;
2. commit to stop the fighting and achieve urgently an effective United Nations supervised cessation of armed violence in all its forms by all parties to protect civilians and stabilise the country.
  To this end, the Syrian government should immediately cease troop movements towards, and end the use of heavy weapons in, population centres, and begin pullback of military concentrations in and around population centres.
  As these actions are being taken on the ground, the Syrian government should work with the Envoy to bring about a sustained cessation of armed violence in all its forms by all parties with an effective United Nations supervision mechanism.
  Similar commitments would be sought by the Envoy from the opposition and all relevant elements to stop the fighting and work with him to bring about a sustained cessation of armed violence in all its forms by all parties with an effective United Nations supervision mechanism;
3. ensure timely provision of humanitarian assistance to all areas affected by the fighting, and to this end, as immediate steps, to accept and implement a daily two-hour humanitarian pause and to coordinate exact time and modalities of the daily pause through an efficient mechanism, including at local level;
4. intensify the pace and scale of release of arbitrarily detained persons, including especially vulnerable categories of persons, and persons involved in peaceful political activities, provide without delay through appropriate channels a list of all places in which such persons are being detained, immediately begin organizing access to such locations and through appropriate channels respond promptly to all written requests for information, access or release regarding such persons;
5. ensure freedom of movement throughout the country for journalists and a non-discriminatory visa policy for them;
6. respect freedom of association and the right to demonstrate peacefully as legally guaranteed.

On 2 August, he resigned as envoy to Syria, citing the intransigence of both the Assad government and the rebels, as well as the stalemate on the Security Council as preventing any peaceful resolution of the situation. Annan also stated that the lack of international unity and ineffective diplomacy among world leaders had made the peaceful resolution in Syria an impossible task.

==== Global Commission on Elections, Democracy and Security ====
Annan served as the chair of the Global Commission on Elections, Democracy and Security. The commission was launched in May 2011 as a joint initiative of the Kofi Annan Foundation and the International Institute for Democracy and Electoral Assistance. It comprised 12 eminent individuals from around the world, including Ernesto Zedillo, Martti Ahtisaari, Madeleine Albright and Amartya Sen, and aimed to highlight the importance of the integrity of elections to achieving a more secure, prosperous and stable world. The Commission released its final report, Deepening Democracy, a Strategy to Improve the Integrity of Elections Worldwide, in September 2012.

=== Rakhine Commission (Myanmar) ===
In September 2016, Annan was asked to lead the Advisory Commission on Rakhine State, Myanmar, an impoverished region beset by ethnic conflict and extreme sectarian violence, particularly by Myanmar's Buddhist majority against the Rohingya Muslim minority, further targeted by government forces. The commission, widely known simply as the "Annan Commission", was opposed by many Myanmar Buddhists as unwelcome interference in their relations with the Rohingya.

When the Annan Commission released its final report, the week of 24 August 2017, with recommendations unpopular with all sides, violence exploded in the Rohingya conflict – the largest and bloodiest humanitarian disaster in the region in decades – driving most of the Rohingya from Myanmar. Annan attempted to engage the United Nations to resolve the matter, but failed.

Annan died a week before the first anniversary of the report, shortly after an announcement by a replacement commission that it would not "point fingers" at the guilty parties – leading to widespread concern that the new commission was just a sham to protect culpable Myanmar government officials and citizens from accountability.

In 2018, before Annan's death, Myanmar's civilian government, under the direction of State Counsellor Aung San Suu Kyi, made a gesture of acceptance of the Annan commission's recommendations by convening another board – the advisory board for the Committee for Implementation of the Recommendations on Rakhine State – ostensibly to implement the Annan commission's proposed reforms, but never actually implemented them. Some of the international representatives resigned – notably the panel's secretary, Thailand's former foreign minister Surakiart Sathirathai, and former US ambassador to the UN Bill Richardson – decrying the "implementation" committee as ineffective, or a "whitewash".

=== Other activities ===
==== Corporate boards ====
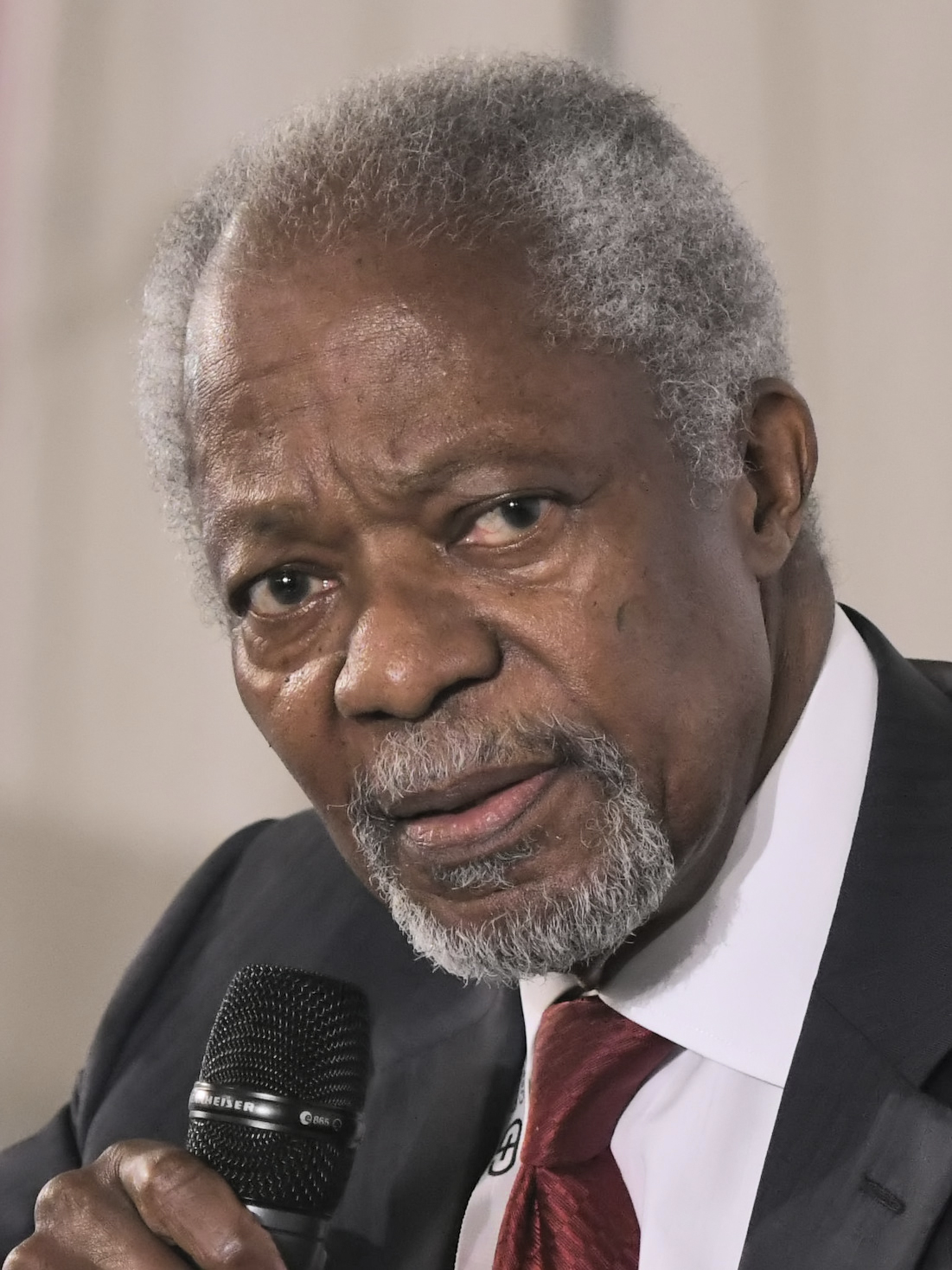
Annan during the 54th Munich Security Conference in February 2018

In March 2011, Annan became a member of the advisory board for Investcorp Bank B. S. C. Europe, an international private equity firm and sovereign wealth fund owned by the United Arab Emirates. He held the position until 2018.

Annan became a member of the Global Advisory Board of Macro Advisory Partners LLP, a risk and strategic consulting firm based in London and New York City for business, finance and government decision-makers, with some operations related to Investcorp.

==== Non-profit organisations ====
In addition to the above, Annan also became involved with several organisations with both global and African focuses, including the following:

- United Nations Foundation, member of the board of directors (2008–2018)
- University of Ghana, chancellor (2008–2018)
- Columbia University School of International and Public Affairs, global fellow (2009–2018)
- Committee on Global Thought at Columbia University, fellow
- Lee Kuan Yew School of Public Policy at the National University of Singapore (NUS), Li Ka Shing Professor (2009–2018)
- Global Centre for Pluralism, member of the board of directors (2010–2018)
- Mo Ibrahim Prize for Achievement in African Leadership, chairman of the prize committee (2007–2018)
- Alliance for a Green Revolution in Africa (AGRA), chairman (2007–2018)
- Global Humanitarian Forum, founder and president (2007–2018)
- Global Commission on Drug Policy, founding commissioner. The commission had declared in a 2011 report that the war on drugs was a failure. Annan believed that, since drug use represents a health risk, it should be regulated, comparing it to the regulation of tobacco which reduced smoking in many countries.

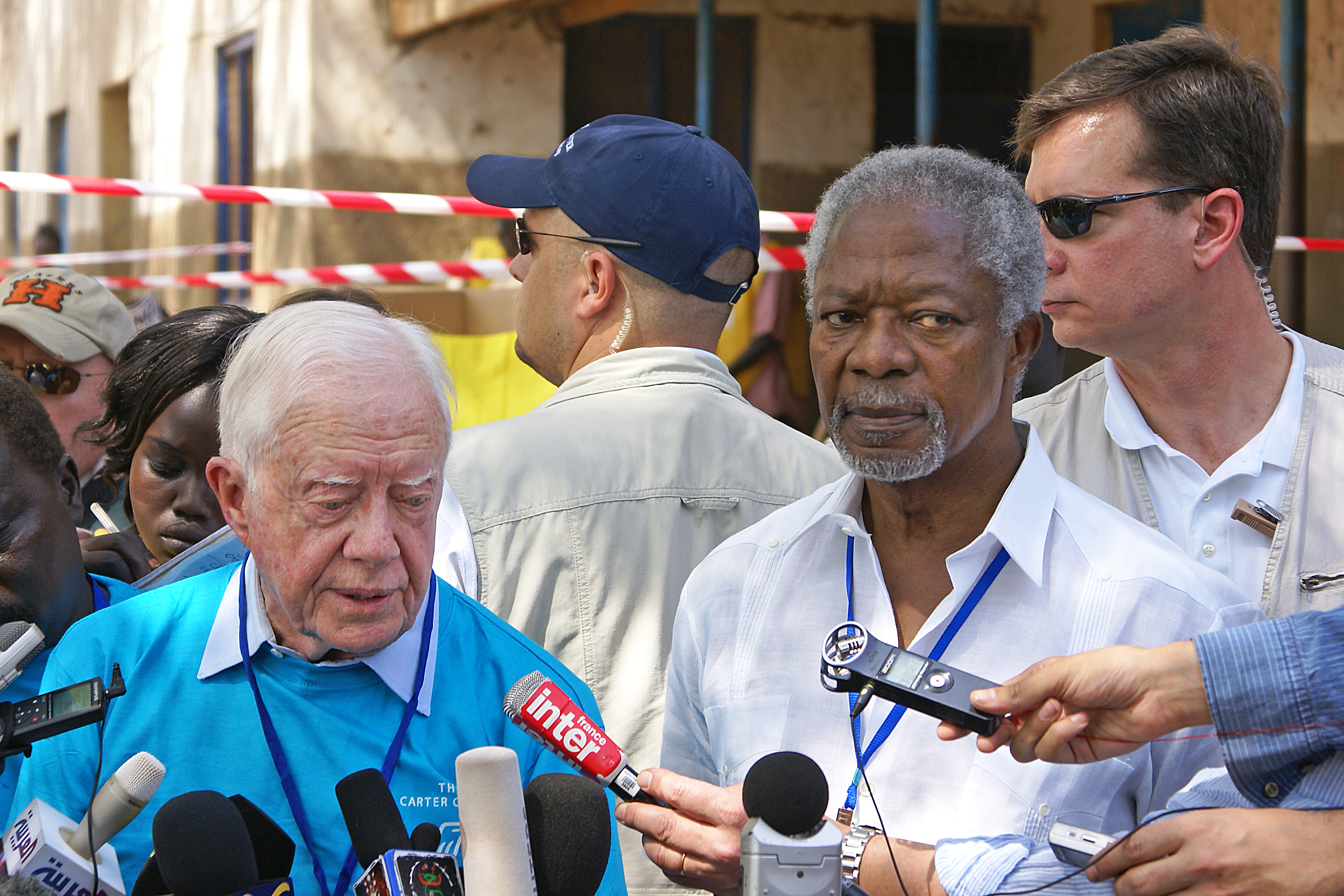
Annan during the South Sudanese independence referendum with fellow elder Jimmy Carter, 2011

Annan served as chair of The Elders, a group of independent global leaders who work together on peace and human rights issues. In November 2008, Annan and fellow elders Jimmy Carter and Graça Machel attempted to travel to Zimbabwe to make a first-hand assessment of the humanitarian situation in the country. Refused entry, the Elders instead carried out their assessment from Johannesburg, where they met Zimbabwe- and South Africa-based leaders from politics, business, international organisations, and civil society. In May 2011, following months of political violence in Côte d'Ivoire, Annan travelled to the country with elders Desmond Tutu and Mary Robinson to encourage national reconciliation.

On 16 October 2014, Annan attended the One Young World Summit in Dublin, Ireland. During a session with fellow elder Mary Robinson, Annan encouraged 1,300 young leaders from 191 countries to lead on intergenerational issues such as climate change and the need for action to take place now, not tomorrow:

We don't have to wait to act. The action must be now. You will come across people who think we should start tomorrow. Even for those who believe action should begin tomorrow, remind them tomorrow begins now, tomorrow begins today, so let's all move forward.

Annan chaired the Africa Progress Panel (APP), a group of ten distinguished individuals who advocate at the highest levels for equitable and sustainable development in Africa. As chair, he facilitated coalition building to leverage and broker knowledge, in addition to convening decision-makers to influence policy and create lasting change in Africa. Every year, the Panel releases a report, the Africa Progress Report, which outlines an issue of immediate importance to the continent and suggests a set of associated policies. In 2014, the Report highlighted the potential of African fisheries, agriculture, and forests to drive economic development. The 2015 report explores the role of climate change and the potential of renewable energy investments in determining Africa's economic future.

Annan played a pivotal role in getting a WHO resolution passed that focused on halving the burden of snakebite by the late 2020s.

=== Memoir ===
On 4 September 2012, Annan with Nader Mousavizadeh wrote a memoir, Interventions: A Life in War and Peace. Published by Penguin Press, the book has been described as a "personal biography of global statecraft".

== Personal life ==
In 1965, Annan married Titi Alakija, a Nigerian woman from an aristocratic family. Several years later, they had a daughter, Ama, and a son, Kojo. The couple separated in the late 1970s, and divorced in 1983.

In 1984, Annan married Nane Lagergren, a Swedish lawyer at the UN and a maternal half-niece of diplomat Raoul Wallenberg. She has a daughter, Nina, from a previous marriage. Nane donated his Nobel Prize medal and diploma to the office of the United Nations in Geneva as she wished to continue his legacy of inspiring future generations.

Annan was fluent in English, French, Akan, and some Kru languages as well as other African languages.

In 2002, Annan was enstooled by Otumfuo Nana Osei Tutu II, the Asantehene of Asanteman, as the Busumuru of the Ashanti people - a Ghanaian chief. He was the first person to hold this title.

== Death and state funeral ==
Annan died on the morning of 18 August 2018 in Bern, Switzerland, at the age of 80, after a short illness. António Guterres, the UN secretary-general, said that Annan was "a global champion for peace" and "a guiding force for good". Malaysian Prime Minister Mahathir Mohamad also said he was saddened by the death of Annan. His body was returned to his native Ghana from Geneva in a brief and solemn ceremony at the Accra International Airport in Accra, on 10 September. His coffin, draped in the blue UN flag, was accompanied by his widow Nane, his children and senior diplomats from the international organisation.

On 13 September, a state funeral was held for Annan in Ghana at the Accra International Conference Centre. The ceremony was attended by several political leaders from across Africa as well as Ghanaian traditional rulers, European royalty and dignitaries from the international community, including the UN secretary-general António Guterres. Prior to the funeral service, his body lay in state in the foyer of the same venue, from 11 to 12 September. A private burial followed the funeral service at the new Military Cemetery at Burma Camp, with full military honours and the sounding of the Last Post by army buglers and a 17-gun salute.

== Honours and awards ==
Annan received numerous awards and accolades including the Nobel Peace Prize in 2001, which he shared with the UN "for their work for a better organized and more peaceful world." He was also awarded the Four Freedoms Award in 2004. Annan declined the U Thant Peace Award in 2006. In 2010, he received the Norman E. Borlaug Medallion from the World Food Prize Foundation for his leadership in global food security. Additionally, he was honored with the Max Schmidheiny Foundation Freedom Prize in 2006.

== Memorials and legacy ==
The United Nations Postal Administration released a new stamp in memory of Annan on 31 May 2019. His portrait on the stamp was designed by artist Martin Mörck. The Kofi Annan International Peacekeeping Training Centre and the Ghana-India Kofi Annan Centre of Excellence in ICT, both in Accra, are named in his honour. The Kofi Annan University of Guinea is named after him. The Kofi Annan Institute for Global Citizenship at Macalester College is named after him as well.

== See also ==
- List of black Nobel laureates

== Notes ==
Diplomatic posts
Preceded by Boutros Boutros-Ghali	Secretary-General of the United Nations; 1997–2006	Succeeded by Ban Ki-moon
New office	UN and Arab League Envoy to Syria; 2012	Succeeded by Lakhdar Brahimi
