= List of international prime ministerial trips made by Mateusz Morawiecki =

This is a list of international prime ministerial trips made by Mateusz Morawiecki, who served as the 17th Prime Minister of Poland from 11 December 2017 to 13 December 2023.

== Summary ==
Morawiecki has visited 26 countries during his tenure as prime minister. The number of visits per country where Morawiecki has traveled are:

- One visit to Austria, France, Germany, Japan, Lebanon, Lithuania, Romania, Slovakia, Switzerland, the United Kingdom, the United States and Vatican City
- Three visits to Czech Republic and Hungary
- Seven visits to Belgium

== 2017 ==
#	Country	Location(s)	Dates	Details	Image
1	Belgium	Brussels	14–15 December	European Council meeting on migration, eurozone reforms, military cooperation and Brexit. Meeting of the prime ministers of the Visegrad Group countries with Italian prime minister Paolo Gentiloni and European Commission president Jean-Claude Juncker. Talks with British prime minister Theresa May and French president Emmanuel Macron.	

== 2018 ==
#	Country	Location(s)	Dates	Details	Image
2	Hungary	Budapest	3 January	Met with Prime Minister Viktor Orbán and Hungarian president János Áder regarding the rule of law, energy, defence, climate and migration.	
3	Belgium	Brussels	9 January	Meetings with President Jean-Claude Juncker and First Vice-president of the European Commission Frans Timmermans. Discussions focused on the future of the European Union, Poland's position in the EU, EU policies within the internal market, the digital single market, and energy and migration.	
4	Switzerland	Davos	24–25 January	Participation in the World Economic Forum. The talks covered the future of Europe, the economy, industry and cybersecurity. Meetings with the prime ministers of Denmark Lars Løkke Rasmussen, the Netherlands Mark Rutte, Canada Justin Trudeau, Luxembourg Xavier Bettel, Norway Erna Solberg, advisor for trade agreements and the Middle East in Donald Trump's cabinet Jared Kushner, United States Secretary of Energy Rick Perry and business representatives from, among others, Wikipedia and Google. Talks with the prime minister of Iraq Haidar al-Abadi. Participation in an informal lunch of World Economic Leaders, among others, together with: Queen Mathilde of Belgium, Prime Ministers of Portugal António Costa, Peruvian Mercedes Aráoz and the head of the International Monetary Fund Christine Lagarde.	
5	Hungary	Budapest	26 January	Participation in the summit of the heads of government of the Visegrad Group countries. Discussions focused on the current situation in Europe, the future of the European Union, and current regional policy issues. Bilateral talks with Czech Prime Minister Andrej Babiš took place on the sidelines of the summit.	
6	Lebanon	Beirut	12–13 February	Meetings with Prime Minister Saad Hariri and Lebanese president Michel Aoun regarding the distribution of aid funds for Syrian refugees staying in the country, as well as promoting economic, development, cultural cooperation and personal contacts, and highlighting the historical ties between both countries and nations. Visiting the Polish Center for International Aid in the Akkar district in the north of the country.	
7	Germany	Berlin, Munich	16–17 February	Meeting with German chancellor Angela Merkel on bilateral economic cooperation, joint projects regarding the defense industry and the single market and freedom to provide services in the European Union. Participation in a discussion at the Körber Global Leaders Dialogue in Berlin with a lecture on Polish-German relations. Participation, together with Austrian chancellor Sebastian Kurz, in a panel on the future of Europe during the 54th Munich Security Conference. Bilateral meetings with Ukrainian president Petro Poroshenko, Prime Ministers Edouard Philippe of France, Pavel Filip of Moldova and Binali Yildirim of Turkey, Chairman of the European People's Party MEP Group in the European Parliament Manfred Weber and Deputy CEO of Google Kent Walker.	
9	Belgium	Brussels	22–23 February	Participation in a dinner hosted by Belgian prime minister Charles Michel for selected leaders of European Union countries and a meeting with First Vice-president of the European Commission Frans Timmermans. Participation in a conference on political stabilization, development and security of countries in the Sahel region, a meeting of prime ministers of the Visegrad Group countries, as well as an informal summit of members of the European Council regarding the launch of negotiations on the future EU budget. Talks with President of Romania Klaus Iohannis and Prime Minister of Sweden Stefan Löfven.	
10	Belgium	Brussels	8 March	Meeting with President Jean-Claude Juncker and First Vice-president of the European Commission Frans Timmermans. Discussions focused on the reform of the justice system in Poland. Participation in the Brussels Forum session organized by the German Marshall Fund think tank.	
11	Lithuania	Vilnius	9 March	Participation in the summit of the prime ministers of the Baltic States: Saulius Skvernelis of Lithuania, Maris Kuczinskis of Latvia, and Juri Ratas of Estonia. Discussions focused on cooperation within the European Union and NATO, as well as on the development of regional energy and transport infrastructure. Meetings with Lithuanian president Dalia Grybauskaite and bilateral meetings with each of the attending prime ministers. An agreement was signed on strengthening energy cooperation between Poland and Lithuania, as well as on port cooperation and the launch of the Szczecin - Klaipėda ferry connection.	
12	Belgium	Brussels	22–23 March	Attended European Council meeting, including: on a coordinated response to the attack on Sergei Skripal in the United Kingdom, climate policy and economic cooperation with the United States. Meeting with the heads of state of the Baltic states: Prime Ministers of Estonia Jüri Ratas and Latvia Māris Kučinskis, and President of Lithuania Dalia Grybauskaitė, together with the president of the European Commission Jean-Claude Juncker. Bilateral talks with Prime Minister of Sweden Stefan Löfven. Coordination meeting of the prime ministers of the Visegrad Group countries.	
13	Hungary	Budapest	6 April	Participation in the unveiling ceremony of the "Memento-Smolensk" monument in Budapest and participation in a meeting with Hungarian prime minister Viktor Orbán. The talks concerned strengthening relations between the two countries.	
14	Vatican City	Vatican City	4 June	Met with Pope Francis. Talks praised strong ties, Church–State collaboration, family and environmental issues, ethical matters, and Poland's support for refugees.	
15	France	Strasbourg	3–4 July	Meeting with the president of the European Parliament, Antonio Tajani, and participating in a debate in the EP plenary chamber on the future of the European Union. During the speech, issues of security, strengthening the common market, tightening tax systems, and commitment to European ideas and traditions were raised.	
16	Czech Republic	Karlovy Vary	6 July	Meeting with Prime Minister Andrej Babiš in Karlovy Vary and attending the local International Film Festival. Discussions focused on the economy, infrastructure, trade and migration.	
17	Austria	Salzburg	19–20 September	Attended a working summit with EU leaders.	
18	Czech Republic	Karviná, Stonava	21 December	A visit to the crisis management center and hospital in Karviná, where a methane explosion occurred in a mine on the evening of December 20. As a result, 13 miners (12 Poles and 1 Czech) died and 10 were injured.	

== 2019 ==
#	Country	Location(s)	Dates	Details	Image
19	United States	Washington, D.C.	17–19 April	Met with President Donald Trump.	
20	Slovakia	Bratislava	24–25 April	Participation in the summit of the heads of government of the Visegrád Group countries with the prime minister of Japan, Shinzō Abe. The talks concerned deepening economic cooperation and political partnership. On the sidelines of the summit, bilateral talks were held with the prime minister of Japan.	
21	Romania	Sibiu	9 May	Participation in the informal summit of the European Union heads of state and government, participation in the meeting of the prime ministers of the Visegrad Group countries, a meeting of leaders with the president of the European Parliament, Antonio Tajani, and participation in a working session of EU leaders. Discussions focused on the future of the European Union.	
22	Belgium	Brussels	16 May	Opening of the Polish lobbying centre Business & Science Poland and participation in the conference on the occasion of the 15th anniversary of Poland's accession to the European Union in Brussels. Meeting with Maroš Šefčovič, vice-president of the European Commission.	
23	United Kingdom	Portsmouth	5 June	Morawiecki attended the 75th anniversary of D-Day commemorative ceremonies alongside international leaders.	

== 2020 ==
#	Country	Location(s)	Dates	Details	Image
24	Czech Republic	Prague	16 January	Attended V4-Austria summit.	
25	Japan	Tokyo	21 January	He held talks with Prime Minister Shinzo Abe. The meeting focused on strengthening political and economic cooperation between the two countries and expanding the strategic partnership between Poland and Japan. They also discussed international security issues, including developments in Europe and East Asia and cooperation between Japan and the Visegrád Group.	
26	Belgium	Brussels	1–2 October	Morawiecki attended an extraordinary European Council.	

== 2021 ==
#	Country	Location(s)	Dates	Details	Image

== 2022 ==
#	Country	Location(s)	Dates	Details	Image

== 2023 ==
#	Country	Location(s)	Dates	Details	Image

== Multilateral meetings ==
Mateusz Morawiecki participated in the following summits during his premiership:

Group	Year					
Group	2018	2019	2020	2021	2022	2023
WEF	24–25 January, (Switzerland) Davos	January, (Switzerland) Davos	22 January, (Switzerland) Davos	17–20 January, (cancelled) (Switzerland) Davos	22–26 May, (Switzerland) Davos	16–20 January, (Switzerland) Davos
EPC	Did not exist				6 October, (Czech Republic) Prague	1 June, (Moldova) Bulboaca
EPC	Did not exist				6 October, (Czech Republic) Prague	5 October, (Spain) Granada
