= United Nations Security Council Resolution 1353 =

UN Security Council Resolution 1353
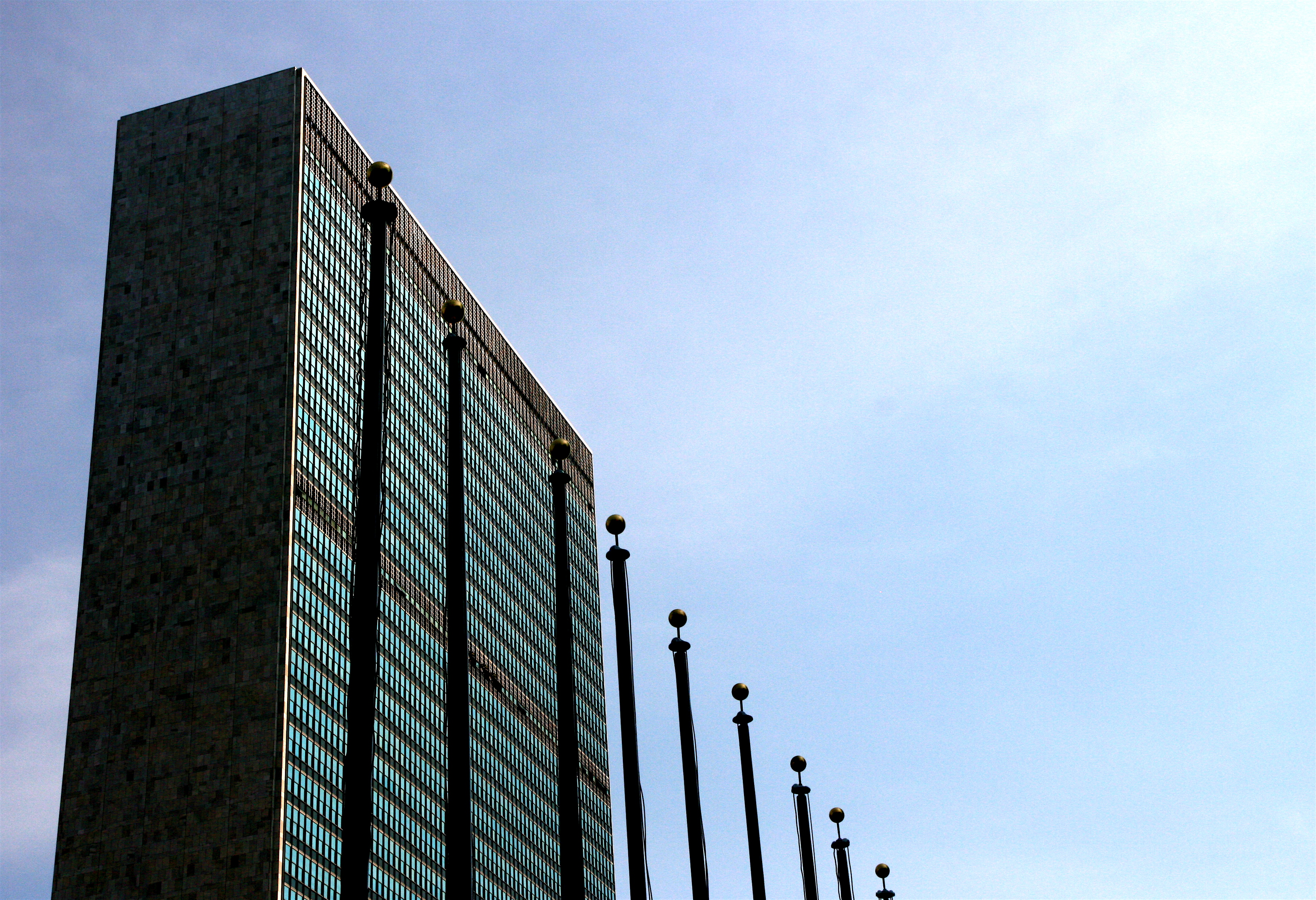
- United Nations Headquarters in New York City
- Date: 13 June 2001
- Meeting no.: 4,326
- Code: S/RES/1353 (Document)
- Subject: Strengthening co-operation with troop-contributing countries
- Voting summary: 15 voted for; None voted against; None abstained
- Result: Adopted

Security Council composition
- Permanent members: China; France; Russia; United Kingdom; United States
- Non-permanent members: Bangladesh; Colombia; Ireland; Jamaica; Mali; Mauritius; Norway; Singapore; Tunisia; Ukraine

United Nations Security Council resolution 1353, adopted unanimously on 13 June 2001, after recalling resolutions 1318 (2000) and 1327 (2000), the Council agreed on proposals to strengthen the relationship of the United Nations with troop-contributing countries and the Secretariat in peacekeeping operations.

== Resolution ==
=== Observations ===
On 16 January 2001 there was a debate on strengthening co-operation with troop-contributing countries in peacekeeping missions. Reaffirming its commitment to the provisions of the United Nations Charter, particularly with regards to maintaining international peace and security, the Council stressed the importance of ensuring the safety and security of United Nations peacekeepers and improve the relationship with troop-contributing countries.

=== Acts ===
The Security Council agreed to adopt the provisions contained in the annexes of the resolution. It requested the Working Group on Peacekeeping Operations to continue its work to improve the effectiveness of United Nations peacekeeping operations and assess and report on the adoption of the current resolution within six months.

=== Annex 322 ===
==== Principles of co-operation with troop-contributing countries ====
It was recognised that the partnership with s were able to perform the mandates assigned to them and also that they had effective training and assistance from the Secretariat. The Secretariat itself required appropriate human and financial resources to fulfil the tasks.

==== Operational issues ====
The establishment of regional peacekeeping centres was encouraged, and the secretary-general was requested to hold discussions with troop-contributing countries during peacekeeping missions to evaluate and learn lessons for future missions and include such information in regular reports to the council. It viewed reconnaissance missions as essential in the development of peacekeeping operations. The capacity of the Secretariat to gather information and analysis needed to be strengthened so that it could give better advice to the security council and troop-contributing countries. An effective public information programme to generate support for peacekeeping missions was necessary.

==== Other mechanisms ====
One possibility was to strengthen peacekeeping operations using the Military Staff Committee and informal mechanisms such as the "Group of Friends".

==== Follow-up ====
Within six months, the effectiveness of meetings with troop-contributing countries would be assessed with a view to possibly improving the system.

=== Annex II ===
The security council proposed that consultations with troop-contributing countries could take place in public or private meetings of the security council and troop-contributing countries; consultation meetings with the troop-contributing countries and meetings between the Secretariat and troop-contributing countries.

== See also ==
- Brahimi Report
- History of United Nations peacekeeping
- List of United Nations peacekeeping operations
- List of United Nations Security Council Resolutions 1301 to 1400 (2000–2002)
