= United Nations Security Council Resolution 1327 =

UN Security Council Resolution 1327
- Ribbon for medals awarded for participation in peacekeeping operations
- Date: 13 November 2000
- Meeting no.: 4,220
- Code: S/RES/1327 (Document)
- Subject: The implementation of the report of the Panel on United Nations Peace Operations
- Voting summary: 15 voted for; None voted against; None abstained
- Result: Adopted

Security Council composition
- Permanent members: China; France; Russia; United Kingdom; United States
- Non-permanent members: Argentina; Bangladesh; Canada; Jamaica; Malaysia; Mali; Namibia; Netherlands; Tunisia; Ukraine

United Nations Security Council resolution 1327, adopted unanimously on 13 November 2000, after recalling Resolution 1318 (2000) adopted at the Millennium Summit and receiving the Report of the Panel on United Nations Peacekeeping (Brahimi Report), the Council adopted a resolution concerning the improvement of its peacekeeping operations.

The Security Council reaffirmed its determination to strengthen United Nations peacekeeping operations. Deciding to review its provisions periodically, the Council adopted the decisions contained in within the annex of the resolution.

== Brahimi report goals ==
The Secretary-General Kofi Annan highlighted five key areas in implementing the Brahimi report:

1. Enhancing rapid deployment of peacekeeping operations;
2. Strengthening the relationship with Member States and legislative bodies;
3. Reforming the management culture of peacekeeping operations;
4. Reforming the peacekeeping operations relationship with field missions;
5. Strengthening relationships with other United Nations bodies.

== Resolution ==
=== I ===
The council recognised the importance of peacekeeping operations having a deterrent capability with a clear objectives and a timeframe. It wanted to be regularly informed by the secretary-general about military operations and humanitarian factors in countries where peacekeeping operations were ongoing. It was also important for peacekeepers to carry out their assigned mandates, and consultations would be strengthened across the system, including with troop-contributing countries.

=== II ===
The mandates of peacekeeping missions had to be appropriate for the situation on the ground, including the need to protect civilians and prospects for success. Rules of engagement had to have a clear legal basis and the secretary-general Kofi Annan was requested to prepare a doctrine for the military component of peacekeeping operations.

=== III ===
The need to improve information gathering of the Secretariat was stressed, and the council welcomed the establishment of Executive Committee on Peace and Security Information and Strategic Analysis Secretariat by the secretary-general.

=== IV ===
A peacekeeping operation had to be ready to deploy as soon as possible following the adoption of a resolution that established its mandate. Timelines for deployment would include 30 days for a traditional operation and 90 days for a complex peacekeeping mission. Task forces would be created within the missions and the Military Staff Committee could be used to enhance peacekeeping capacity.

=== V ===
The roots of conflict had to be addressed with sustainable development and a democratic society with respect for human rights. It agreed with the Secretary-General that steps to reduce poverty and economic growth would be a step towards conflict prevention. The council was determined to whether disputes or a situation could lead to tensions and would make subsequent recommendations. It was also important that resolutions 1296 (2000) and 1325 (2000) concerning the protection of civilians and the role of women in armed conflict respectively were implemented.

=== VI ===
The Executive Committee on Peace and Security would be tasked with strengthening peacekeeping capabilities by the Secretary-General. Measures to reduce poverty and promote economic growth were important for successful peacekeeping. It was emphasised that disarmament, demobilisation and reintegration programmes had to be better co-ordinated and funded. The Secretary-General would, in future, highlight what the United Nations could do to strengthen local law enforcement and human rights institutions drawing on previous experience.

=== VII ===
The secretary-general would identify areas where it would be easy to establish temporary criminal proceedings.

== See also ==
- History of United Nations peacekeeping
- List of United Nations Security Council Resolutions 1301 to 1400 (2000–2002)
- List of United Nations peacekeeping missions
- United Nations Security Council Resolution 1353
