= Kojo Annan =

Ghanaian-Nigerian businessman

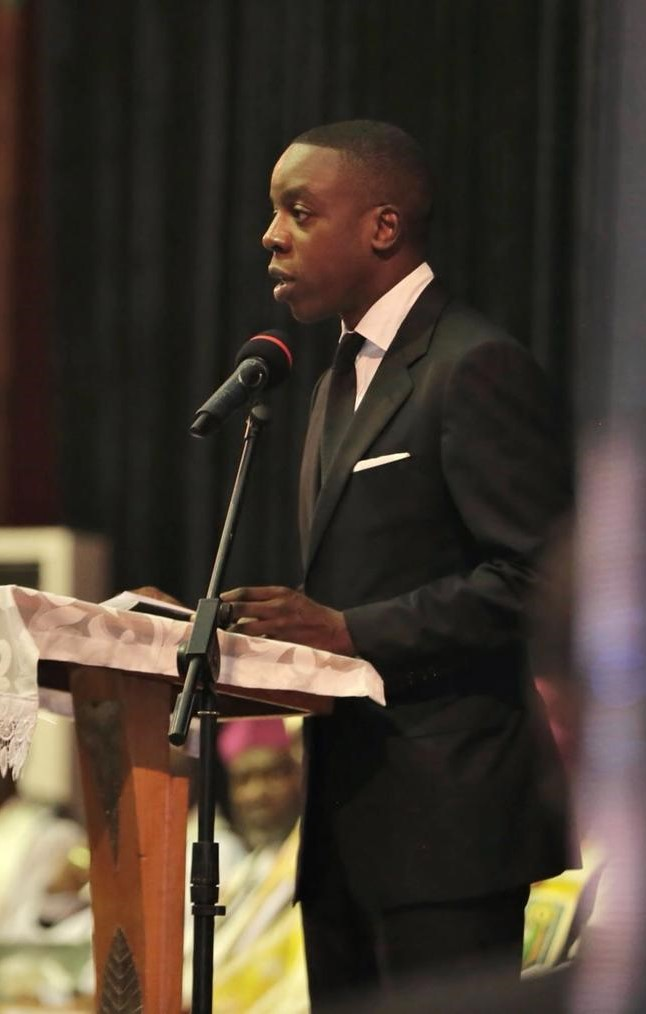
- Annan speaking during his father's, Kofi Annan, funeral in Ghana in 2018.
- Born: Kojo Adeyemo Annan; 25 July 1973 (age 53); Geneva, Switzerland
- Education: Rydal Preparatory School; Rendcomb College; Keele University
- Occupation: Businessman
- Known for: Only son of former UN Secretary-General Kofi Annan
- Spouse: Shanthi Wilkinson (m. 2014)
- Parent: Kofi Annan (father)
- Relatives: Adeyemo Alakija (grandfather); Kobina Annan (uncle); Aduke Alakija (aunt)
- Website: www.kojoannan.com

Kojo Adeyemo Annan (born 25 July 1973) is a Ghanaian-Nigerian businessman and son of the late former UN Secretary-General Kofi Annan. From 1995 to 1997, Kojo Annan worked in West Africa for the Swiss-based inspection company Cotecna, as a marketing consultant. He came to public attention when questions were raised about whether a contract, won by Cotecna, was due to Annan's connections. An IIC investigation however, refuted the suggestion and The Sunday Times were also required, in a libel settlement, to state that "the allegation was untrue." Annan currently has interests in a number of start-ups and, in 2016, he founded Africa10, a social enterprise focused on the development of African youth through sports and education.

== Early life ==
Kojo Annan was born in Geneva, Switzerland, on 25 July 1973. Annan and his sister Ama Annan were the children of Kofi Annan's and his first wife, Nigerian, Titi Alakija. The couple separated when Kojo was six years old and divorced two years later. After his parents separated, he lived with his father and spent holidays with his mother and sister. Annan's second name "Adeyemo" means "the crown befits the child" in Yoruba. He is also the maternal grandson of Sir Adeyemo Alakija.

Kojo Annan was educated in Wales at the independent Rydal Preparatory School, and in England, at Rendcomb College, where he excelled as a rugby player and subsequently at Keele University. He was also educated in Switzerland.

== Career ==
From 1995 to 1997, Kojo Annan worked in West Africa for the Swiss-based inspection company Cotecna, then as a marketing consultant for the company.

In September 1998, Kojo Annan met with several heads of state and government ministers during the opening session of the U.N. General Assembly. In December, Cotecna won a $4.8 million Oil-for-Food contract.

Kojo Annan, Kofi Annan and Cotecna deny that the younger Annan was involved in the Oil-for-Food contract. Kojo Annan also claimed that connections with Cotecna severed after 1998; however, he continued to be paid by the company until February 2004.

The Second Interim Report by the IIC confirmed that Cotecna indeed won the Oil-for-Food contract fairly and based on merit. The Committee concluded that there was no link between Kofi Annan and the award of Cotecna's contract; and Cotecna had been transparent and cooperative through this investigation.

On 13 December 2004, Kojo Annan claimed that the probe into the Oil-for-Food Programme by U.S. congressional committees was "a witchhunt from day one as part of a broader Republican political agenda."

A January 2005 article in The Sunday Times announced that he had confessed involvement in the UN Oil-for-Food Programme scandal; in a libel settlement eleven months later, the paper announced that it now "entirely accepts that the allegation was untrue."

Megadeth's front-man Dave Mustaine, mentioned Kojo Annan in the song "United Abominations", the title track of Megadeth's 2007 studio release. This song, based on the UN, sparked an official retort from the UN on 10 July by Mark Leon Goldberg of the United Nations affairs blog, UN Dispatch, who posted a rebuttal based on the accusations Mustaine made in the song.

In April 2016, he was listed in a leaked confidential document, the Panama Papers, revealing his use of offshore accounts.

Kojo Annan currently holds interest in a number of start-ups and has founded Africa10 in 2016, a social enterprise focusing on the development of African youth through sports and education.

== Personal life ==
In March 2014, it was reported that Kojo Annan had married Shanthi Wilkinson. He has two sons, born 2015 and 2018. He is the son of former UN Secretary-General Kofi Annan and the nephew of Ghanaian diplomat Kobina Annan.
