= Kobina Annan =

Ghanaian diplomat and consultant

Ghana's Ambassador to the Kingdom of Morocco
- In office July 2002 – January 2009
- President: John Agyekum Kufuor
- Preceded by: J. E. K. Osafo
- Succeeded by: Samuel Mbrayeh Quartey

Personal details
- Born: 1944 (age 81–82) Ghana
- Relations: Kofi Annan (brother); Kojo Annan (nephew)
- Children: 2
- Education: Macalester College
- Occupation: Economist, Business consultant.

Kobina Annan (born 1944) is a retired Ghanaian diplomat, economist and business consultant. He was Ghana's Ambassador to Morocco from 2002 to 2009. He is the brother of Kofi Annan and the uncle of Kojo Annan. Prior to serving as Ghana's Ambassador to Morocco, he had studied and worked with several companies in both the UK and the US for over 30 years.

== Early life and education ==
Kobina Annan is the son of Henry Reginald Annan and the brother of the late former Secretary-General of the United Nations, Kofi Annan. Annan obtained a Bachelor of Arts degree in economics from Macalester College, St. Paul, Minnesota just like his elder brother Kofi Annan.

== Career ==
From 1972 to 2002, Annan served in different roles in capacities in both Ghana and in New York He served as Deputy Managing Director of Trillium International Inc., New York and also later as the Regional manager of the US company Globe Inspection Ltd. in London. He also served as the Deputy head of the training program of the African American Institute, New York, for South Africa and later as the managing director of Marino Consulting Company Ltd, Accra.

In July 2002, he was appointed by President John Agyekum Kufuor to serve as Ghana's ambassador to the Kingdom of Morocco, stationed at Rabat. He served from 2002 to 2009. He presented his letter of credence to His Majesty King Mohammed VI of Morocco on 4 February 2009.

Annan is currently a member of Vital Capital, an impact investment and private equity fund focused on Sub-Saharan African.

== Personal life ==
Annan is married and has two adult children. He is the younger brother of Kofi Annan and the uncle of Ghanaian-Nigerian businessman Kojo Annan.

Diplomatic posts
Preceded by J. E. K. Osafo	Ghana Ambassador to Morocco; 2002–2009	Succeeded by Samuel Mbrayeh Quartey
