= Report of the Panel on United Nations Peace Operations =

The Report of the Panel on United Nations Peace Operations (2000) is commonly called the Brahimi Report, named for the chairman of the commission that produced it, Lakhdar Brahimi. UN Secretary-General Kofi Annan had convened the Panel on March 7, 2000, ahead of the upcoming Millennium Summit, and had tasked it with making a thorough review of United Nations peace and security activities and recommending improvements. The report was published on August 17, 2000. In identical letters dated 21 August 2000 transmitting the report to the presidents of the UN General Assembly and the UN Security Council, Annan called the Panel's recommendations "essential to make the United Nations truly credible as a force for peace."

The Report stands among the 1992 Agenda For Peace and the 1995 Supplement to an Agenda for Peace as one of the main documents on UN peacekeeping reform.

The report noted that the United Nations member states have not yet implemented a standing UN army or standing UN police force. As a result, UN peace operations have been based on ad hoc coalitions of willing states. The report addressed many of the resulting dysfunctions of United Nations peace and security operations, including lack of commitment from Member States to make available standing peace operations personnel and resources, and particularly its inability to carry out its mission for lack of a proper global information collection, processing, and analysis capability. In combination with the service of MajGen Patrick Cammaert of the Royal Netherlands Marines, and the publication of the first book on Peacekeeping Intelligence, which was put on display at 1 UN Plaza, the Brahimi Report lead the United Nations to focus more on "intelligence". Now better understood as "decision support," intelligence is still not present at the United Nations, but efforts are being made to establish information capabilities that can address the ten threats identified by the High Level Threat Panel.

The United Nations Security Council adopted several provisions relating to peacekeeping following the report, in Resolution 1327 (2000).

== Brahimi Report Overview ==
1. Enhancing rapid deployment of peacekeeping operations;
2. Strengthening the relationship with Member States and legislative bodies;
3. Reforming the management culture of peacekeeping operations;
4. Reforming the peacekeeping operations relationship with field missions;
5. Strengthening relationships with other United Nations bodies.
6. Long-term/ Short-term strategic planning
7. UN Missions must be flexible
8. Rapid deployment standards and "on-call" expertise (6–12 weeks deployment of troops)
9. Enhance headquarters capacity to plan and support peace operations

Among the recommendations in the Report were:

1. the consent of the local parties for stationing of the UN peace forces, impartiality and the use of force only in self-defence
2. a call for more robust mandates so as to enable UN operations to effectively protect themselves, civilians and their mandate.
3. the idea of a new information-gathering and analysis entity to support the informational and analytical needs of the Secretary-General
4. the creation of a regularly updated list of potential leadership personal and experts for Peacekeeping missions
5. the creation of multinational standby forces ready to deploy on short notice
6. the authorization of the Secretary-General to commit up to $50 Million for the preparation of a peacekeeping mission in advance of a final Security Council mandate
7. an increase in the size of the Department of Peacekeeping Operations
