= Busumuru =

Traditional honour of Asanteman

Busumuru is one of the highest traditional honours of the Asante Empire (Asante Twi: Asanteman). In a sense, the honour can be likened to a civilian award such as the Presidential Medal of Freedom or to a title of nobility.

Otumfuo Osei Tutu II, the Asantehene, conferred the honour on Kofi Annan in 2002 for "his selfless contributions to humanity and promotion of peace throughout the world". Since the founding of the Asante Empire in the 17th century, Annan is the only person in its recorded history to be granted the honour.
