= European Security and Defence Union =

Proposed union

The European Security and Defence Union (ESDU) is a concept proposed by Germany, France, Luxembourg and Belgium on 29 April 2003 for the further development of the European Security and Defence Policy (ESDP), first proposed by Dominique de Villepin and Joschka Fischer in 2002 and adopted on 17 December 2017. The Security and Defence Union is often equated with the EU's Permanent Structured Cooperation (PESCO).

== Content ==
The member states should:

- undertake to assist and support each other in the event of danger
- systematically coordinate their positions (on defence issues)
- coordinate their defence efforts
- develop their military capabilities
- regularly increase their defence spending

== Germany and the ESDU ==
The goal of creating a European Security and Defence Union was laid down in the defence policy guidelines of the German Federal Ministry of Defence in 2003. In the ongoing debate on improving European security structures and the possible creation of a joint European army, representatives of both the SPD and the CDU refer to the ESDP concept.

== Projects of the ESDU ==
Initially, it was reported that 17 projects had been approved. Other sources report 47 project proposals, of which 10 are expected to be approved:

- Construction of a mobile hospital
- Development of logistics for the movement of troops and equipment
- Establishment of a training centre for military instructors
- Developing infrastructure for rapid deployment (including roads, bridges and railway lines that can be used to transport heavy goods in an emergency)

== See also ==
- Common Security and Defence Policy
