= 54th Munich Security Conference =

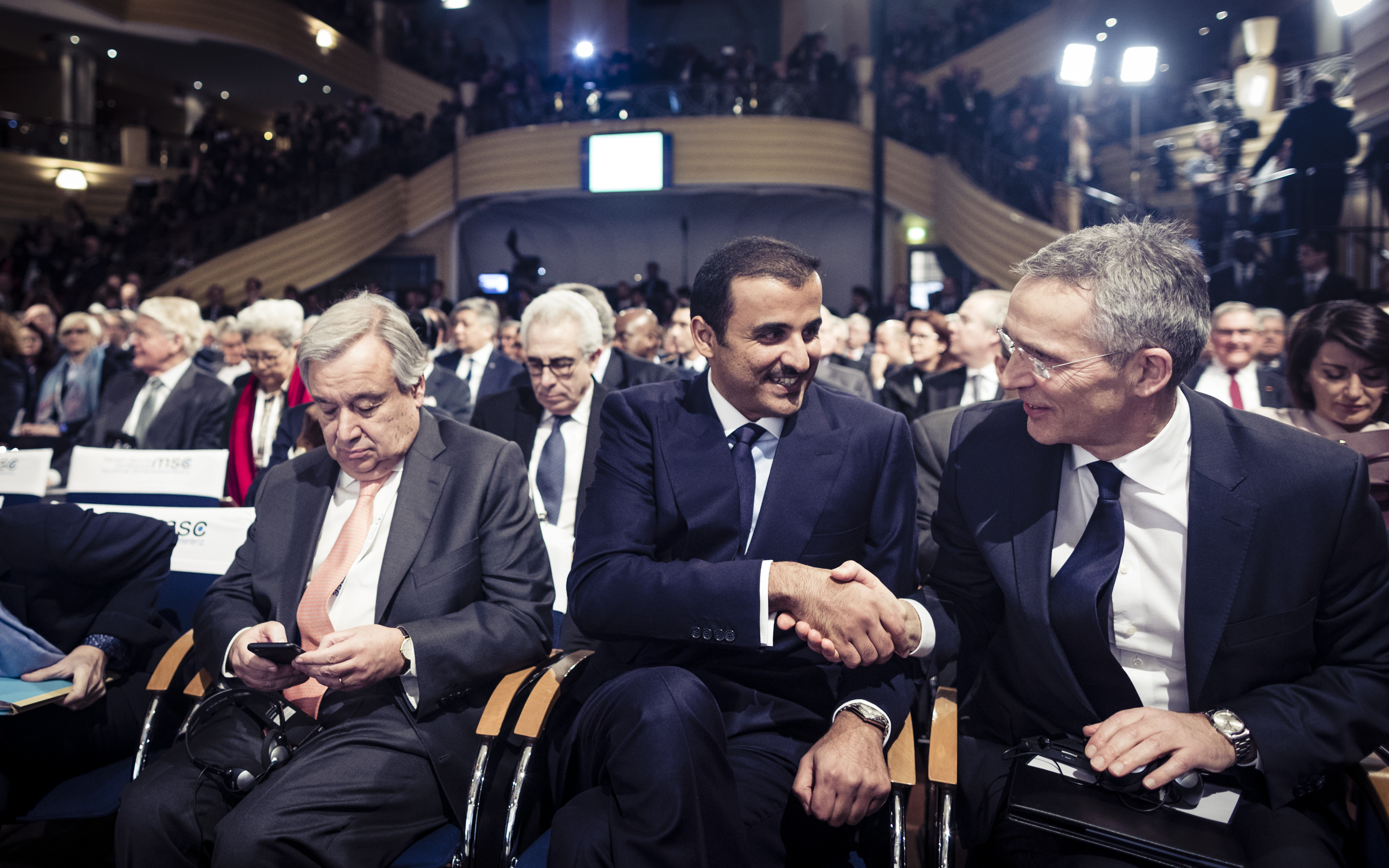
António Guterres, Qatar's Emir Tamim bin Hamad and NATO secretary general Jens Stoltenberg

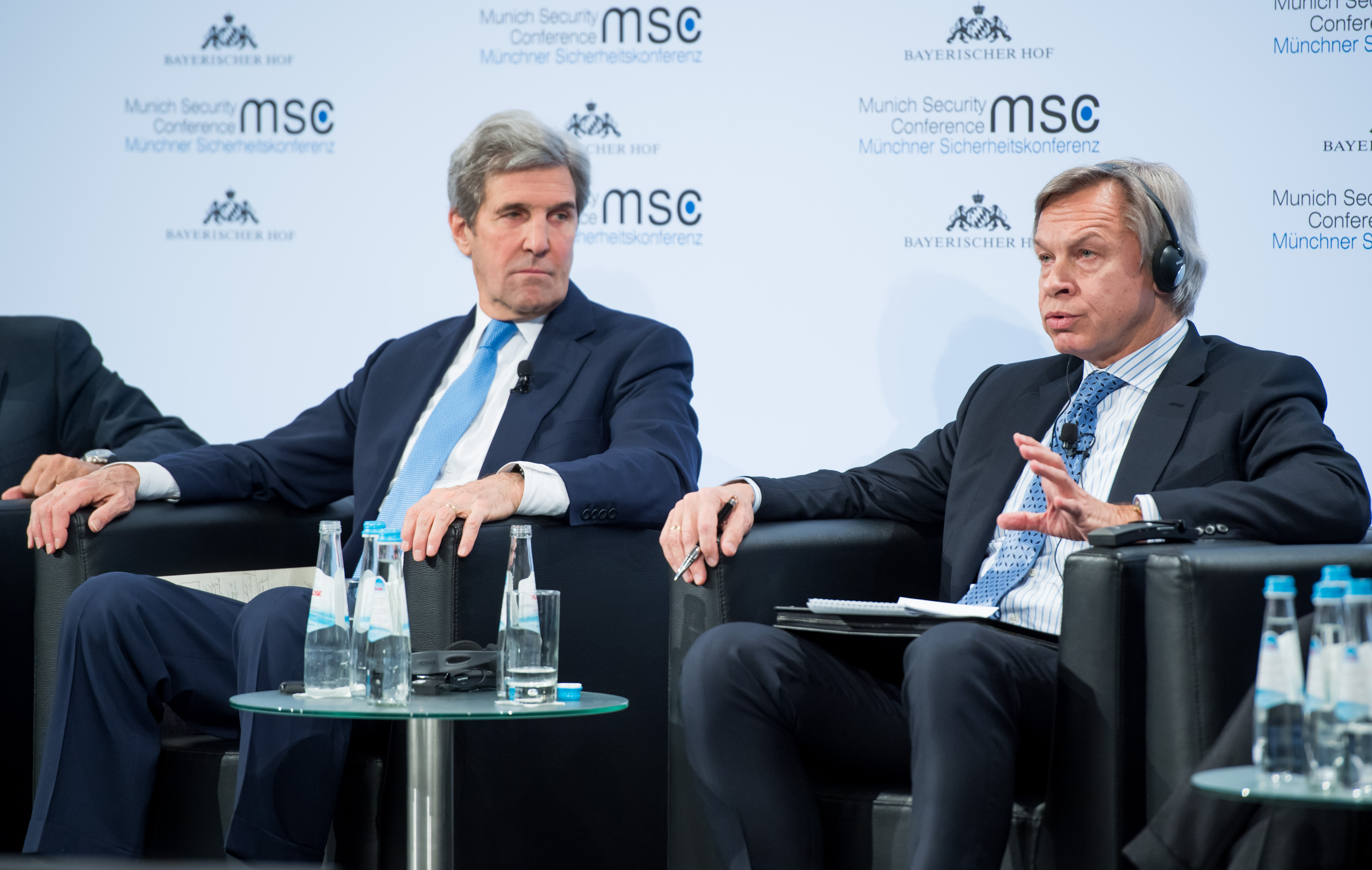
Russian senator Aleksey Pushkov and former U.S. secretary of state John Kerry

The 54th Munich Security Conference (MSC 2018) took place from 16 to 18 February 2018 at the Hotel Bayerischer Hof in Munich.

== Opening ==
Federal Defence Minister Ursula von der Leyen and French Defence Minister Florence Parly spoke at the opening and reaffirmed their commitment to stronger military cooperation. According to von der Leyen, Permanent Structured Cooperation (PESCO) marks an important step towards a European Security and Defence Union. The agreement on Pesco and a European defence fund are a "cultural revolution", enthused Parly. "And there would be more steps to follow."

== Agenda ==
The Munich Security Report 2018 was published before the conference with the title "To the Brink - and Back?". The key themes of the conference and the Munich Security Report 2018 included the crisis of the liberal international order and the consequences from Donald Trump's first year as President of the United States. "Last year, the world moved too close to a major international conflict," MSC chairman Wolfgang Ischinger stated in the run-up to the conference. "The rhetorical escalations of individual decision-makers are very worrying, whether on the Korean Peninsula, in the Gulf or in Eastern Europe - if someone makes a wrong decision in charged situations, that could quickly set off a dangerous chain reaction," Ischinger warned.

In particular, the future and capacity of the European Union and its relations with Russia and the United States were on the agenda of MSC 2018. In addition, the threat of the liberal international order, the numerous conflicts in the Middle East - in particular the worsening relations between the Gulf States - and the development of the political situation in the Sahel were discussed. Also disarmament issues were discussed, especially with respect to the conflict over the North Korean nuclear program.

Panel discussions took place on the following topics:

- EU and NATO defence cooperation
- Nuclear security policy
- Security for the Sahel
- Jihad after the caliphate
- Countries between Russia and Europe

== Participants ==
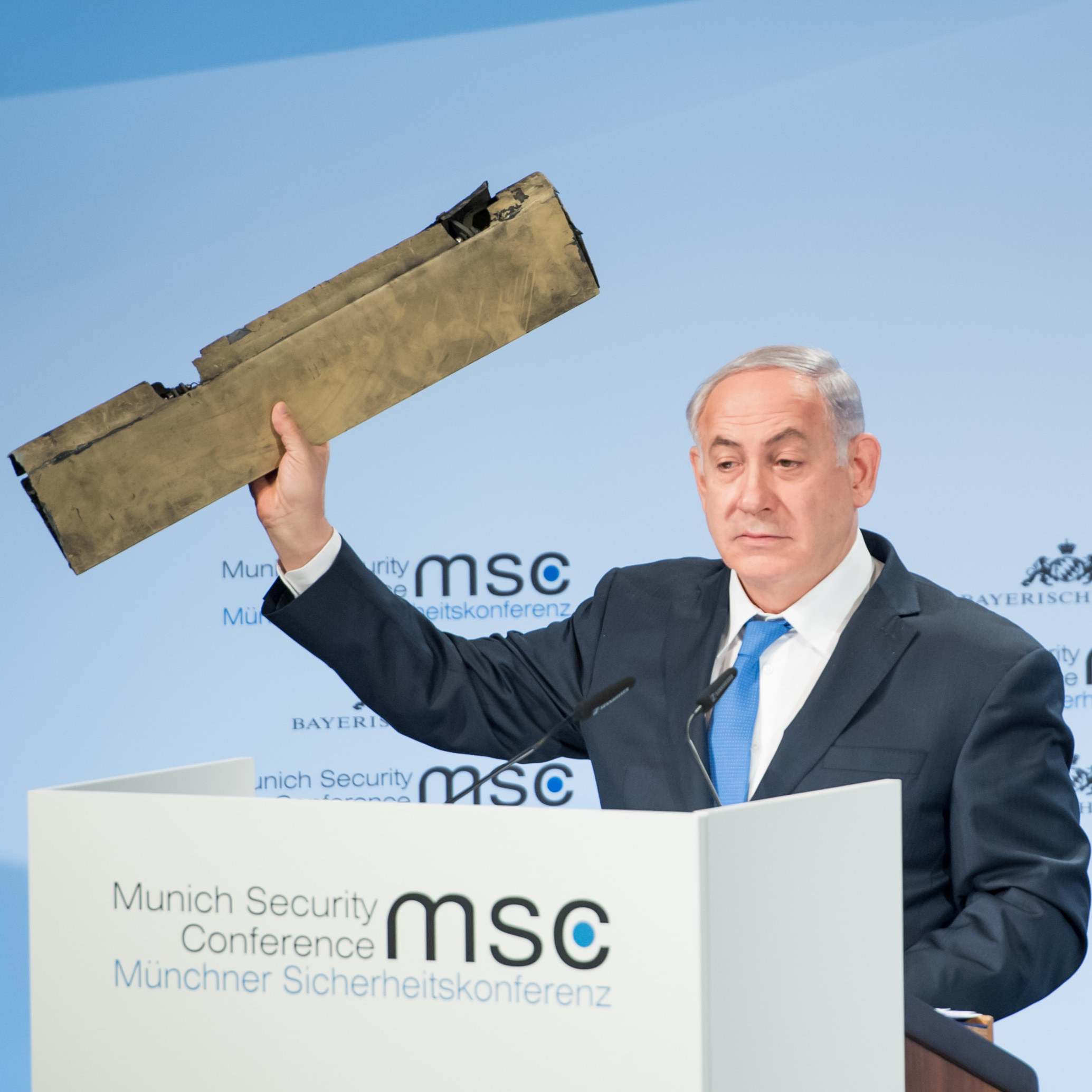
Israeli prime minister Benjamin Netanyahu displays a piece of an armed Iranian drone that was shot down over Israel after infiltrating from Syria. The idea to display the drone piece came from his spokesman David Keyes.

Benjamin Netanyahu was the first-ever Israeli Prime Minister to take part in the conference. While delivering his remarks, Netanyahu brandished a wing flap from an Iranian drone that infiltrated Israel a few weeks earlier and was shot down. Netanyahu's dramatic display grabbed headlines around the world and inspired memes on social media. Iranian foreign minister Javad Zarif called Netanyahu's prop a "cartoonish circus" that "does not even deserve the dignity of a response." Netanyahu said the fact that Zarif was forced to respond was "the whole point" of the display and a public relations win. Netanyahu's spokesman David Keyes was credited for his role in shaping the prime minister's media strategy.

Other guests included UN Secretary-General António Guterres, EU Commission President Jean-Claude Juncker and NATO Secretary General Jens Stoltenberg.

Arriving from the US were Secretary of Defense General James Mattis and National Security Advisor to US president Donald Trump, H.R. McMaster. The delegation of the US Congress was chaired by Senators Sheldon Whitehouse and Robert Corker.

Other visiting heads of state and heads of government included Ukrainian president Petro Poroshenko, Rwandan President Paul Kagame, and Emir of Qatar Sheikh Tamim bin Hamad Al Thani. The prime minister of the United Kingdom Theresa May, her Austrian counterpart Chancellor Sebastian Kurz and the Turkish prime minister Binali Yıldırım also participated in the MSC, as well as the Polish prime minister Mateusz Morawiecki and the Iraqi Prime Minister Haider al-Abadi.

Numerous international organizations were also represented at MSC 2018. Secretary-General of the Organization for Security and Co-operation in Europe Thomas Greminger, Chief Prosecutor of the International Criminal Court Fatou Bensouda and director of the International Monetary Fund Christine Lagarde participated. Other participants also included, Commission President of the African Union Moussa Faki Mahamat, Director of the World Food Programme David Beasley, President of the International Committee of the Red Cross Peter Maurer, and executive director of Human Rights Watch Kenneth Roth.

Representatives of the leading federal regimes which attended the conference together with more than 30 members of parliament from all political groups were Federal Foreign Minister Sigmar Gabriel, Defence Minister Ursula von der Leyen, Federal Interior Minister Thomas de Maizière and Federal Minister for Economic Cooperation and Development Gerd Müller.

== Side events ==
The main conference was accompanied by numerous side events organized by international institutions and organizations. These included the United Nations, the African Union, the International Committee of the Red Cross, the Organization for Security and Co-operation in Europe, NATO, and NGOs and institutions such as the Robert Bosch Stiftung, the International Cooperation Agency (GIZ), Transparency International, German Aerospace Center, the Bill & Melinda Gates Foundation, the Stockholm International Peace Research Institute, the Center for Strategic and International Studies and the Atlantic Council.

In addition, there were public events such as a literary series with the Börsenverein des Deutschen Buchhandels (German book trade association ) and several events on technology and cyber issues. On the eve of the conference, MSC hosted a "Town Hall Meeting" entitled "The Force Awakens: Artificial Intelligence and Modern Conflict" at the Hotel Bayerischer Hof.

== Award ceremonies ==
The American politician John McCain was awarded the Ewald von Kleist Prize for his services to the transatlantic relationship and the security conference. Since Senator McCain could not travel to Munich due to illness, his wife Cindy accepted the prize on his behalf. For many years, Senator McCain led US congressional delegations at security conferences. Wolfgang Ischinger, chairman of the conference, was awarded the Nunn-Lugar Award for Promoting Nuclear Security by the Carnegie Corporation and the Carnegie Endowment for International Peace.

== Statements ==
Nicholas Burns, the former US Ambassador to NATO, stated: "We have troops in Poland and three Baltic countries. I think NATO is unified. We have to continue the sanctions against Russia." Konstantin Kosachev, the chairman of the Foreign Affairs Committee of the Russian Senate, claimed that "NATO’s continued existence provokes new threats, rather than overcoming them. This conference has always been anti-Russian. Unfortunately, they try to blame Russia for all the problems facing the West." German Foreign Minister Sigmar Gabriel accused Russia and China of trying to "undermine" the liberal Western world order. Gabriel said that "Nobody should attempt to divide the European Union: not Russia, not China and also not the United States."

== Security Measures ==
The Munich city centre was guarded by 4,000 police officers. According to the police, around 20 counter-demonstrations were planned.
