= List of bird genera =

List of bird genera concerns the Chordata class of Aves or birds, characterised by feathers, a beak with no teeth, the laying of hard-shelled eggs, and a high metabolic rate.

== Accipitriformes ==
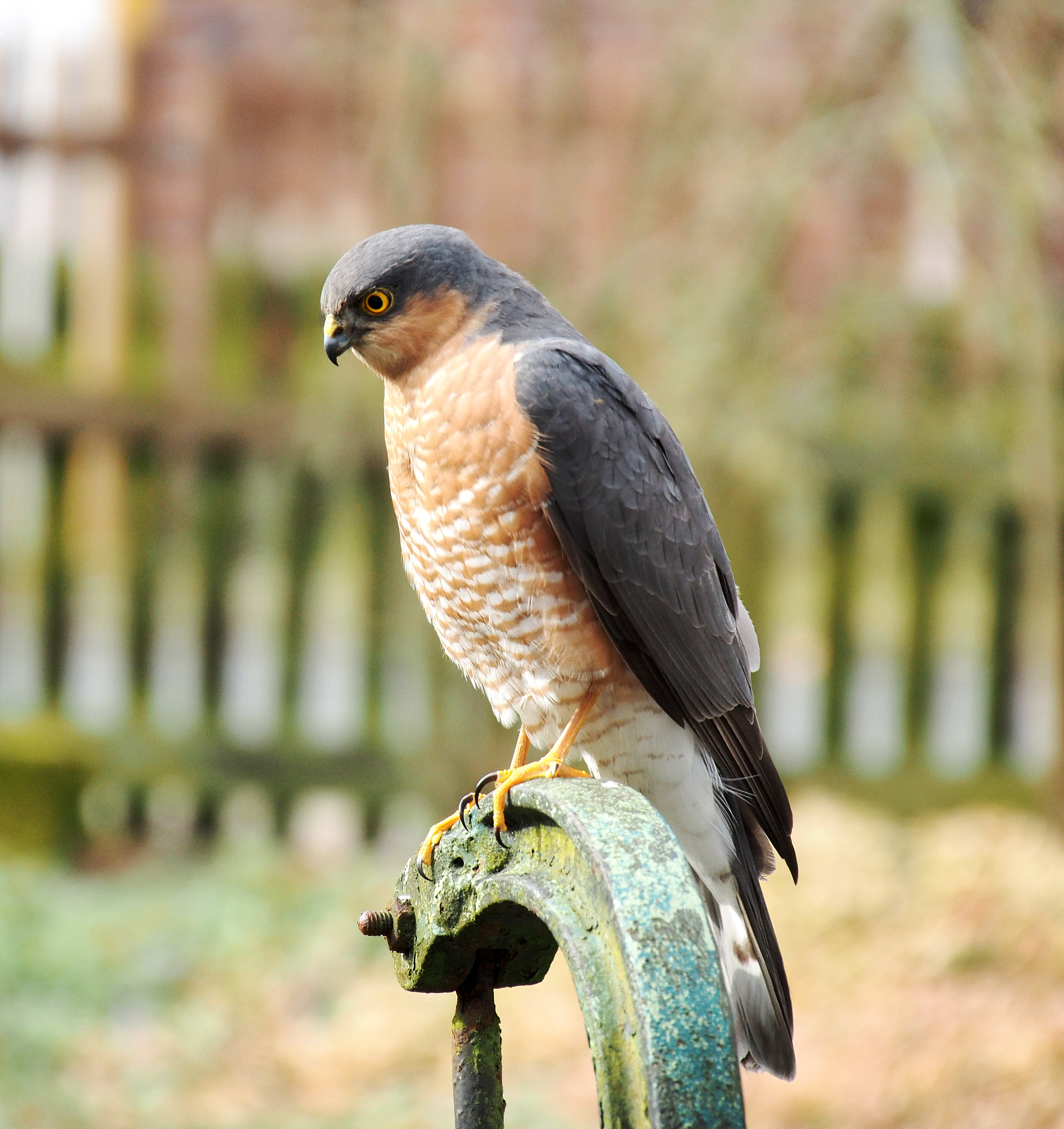
Eurasian sparrowhawk (Accipiter nisus)

Eagles, Old World vultures, secretary-birds, hawks, harriers, etc.

- Family Accipitridae – buzzards, eagles, harriers, hawks, kites, Old World vultures
  - Genus Accipiter
  - Genus Aegypius – Eurasian black vulture
  - Genus Aquila – eagles
  - Genus Aviceda
  - Genus Busarellus - black-collared hawk
  - Genus Butastur
  - Genus Buteo – buzzards
  - Genus Buteogallus
  - Genus Chelictinia
  - Genus Chondrohierax
  - Genus Circaetus
  - Genus Circus – harriers
  - Genus Clanga – spotted eagles
  - Genus Cryptoleucopteryx – plumbeous hawk
  - Genus Elanoides – swallow-tailed kite
  - Genus Elanus
  - Genus Erythrotriorchis
  - Genus Eutriorchis – Madagascan serpent eagle
  - Genus Gampsonyx – pearl kite
  - Genus Geranoaetus
  - Genus Geranospiza – crane hawk
  - Genus Gypaetus – bearded vulture
  - Genus Gypohierax – palm-nut vulture
  - Genus Gyps
  - Genus Haliaeetus – sea eagles
  - Genus Haliastur
  - Genus Hamirostra – black-breasted buzzard
  - Genus Harpagus
  - Genus Harpia – harpy eagle
  - Genus Harpyhaliaetus
  - Genus Harpyopsis – Papuan eagle
  - Genus Helicolestes – slender-billed kite
  - Genus Henicopernis
  - Genus Hieraaetus
  - Genus Icthyophaga
  - Genus Ictinaetus – black eagle
  - Genus Ictinia
  - Genus Kaupifalco – lizard buzzard
  - Genus Leptodon
  - Genus Leucopternis
  - Genus Lophaetus – long-crested eagle
  - Genus Lophoictinia – square-tailed kite
  - Genus Lophotriorchis – rufous-bellied eagle
  - Genus Macheiramphus – bat hawk
  - Genus Megatriorchis – Doria's goshawk
  - Genus Melierax
  - Genus Micronisus – gabar goshawk
  - Genus Milvus
  - Genus Morphnarchus – barred hawk
  - Genus Morphnus – crested eagle
  - Genus Necrosyrtes – hooded vulture
  - Genus Neophron – Egyptian vulture
  - Genus Nisaetus
  - Genus Parabuteo
  - Genus Pernis – honey-buzzards
  - Genus Pithecophaga
  - Genus Polemaetus
  - Genus Polyboroides
  - Genus Pseudastur
  - Genus Rostrhamus – snail kite
  - Genus Rupornis – roadside hawk
  - Genus Sarcogyps – red-headed vulture
  - Genus Spilornis
  - Genus Spizaetus
  - Genus Stephanoaetus
  - Genus Terathopius – bateleur
  - Genus Torgos – lappet-faced vulture
  - Genus Trigonoceps – white-headed vulture
  - Genus Urotriorchis – long-tailed hawk
- Family Pandionidae – osprey
  - Genus Pandion
- Family Sagittariidae – secretarybird
  - Genus Sagittarius

== Anseriformes ==
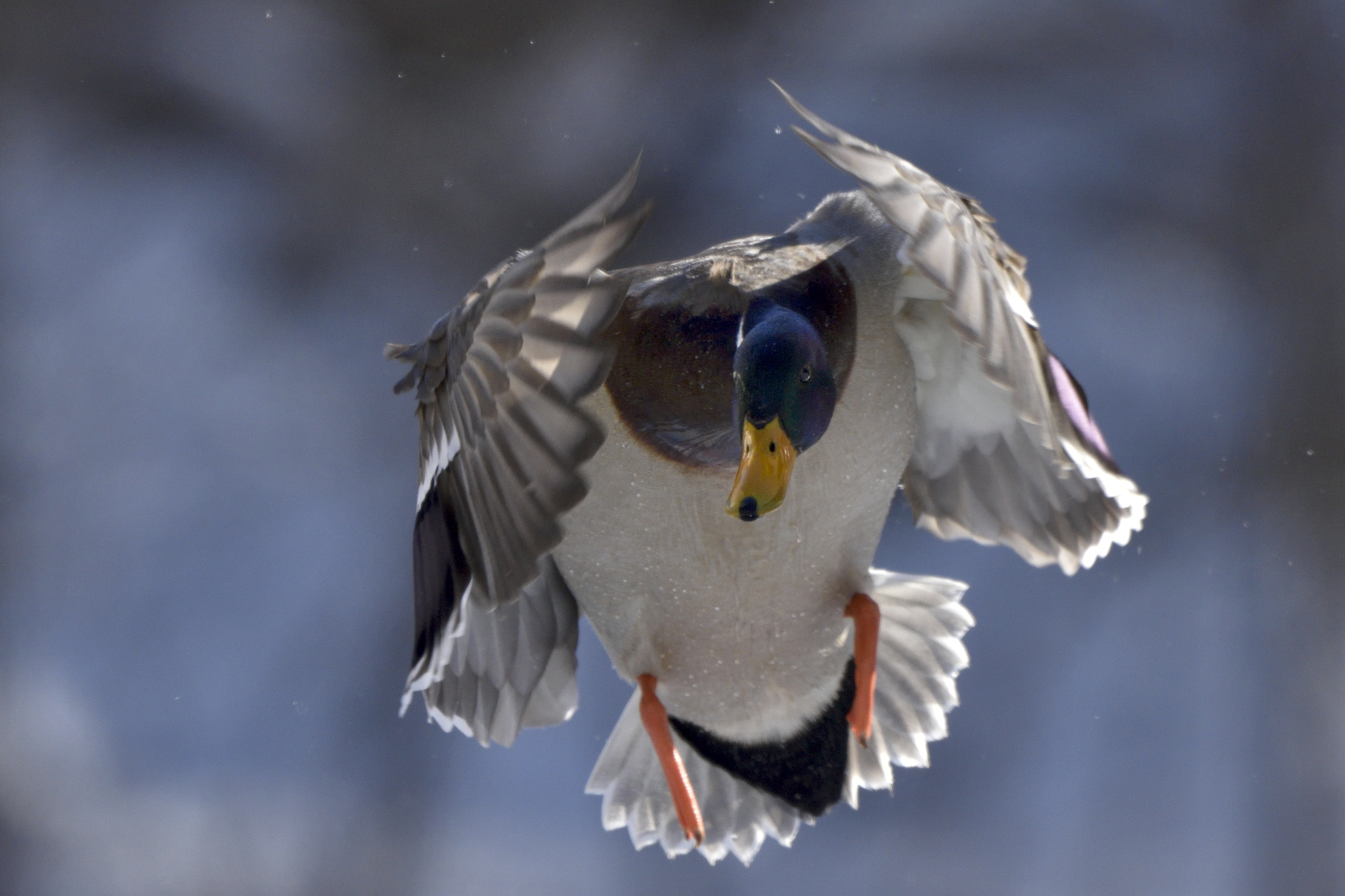
Landing mallard drake

Waterfowl

- Family Anhimidae – screamers
  - Genus Anhima – horned screamer
  - Genus Chauna
- Family Anatidae
  - Genus Aix – mandarin duck and wood duck
  - Genus Alopochen – Egyptian goose
  - Genus Amazonetta – Brazilian teal
  - Genus Anas – pintails, mallards, etc.
  - Genus Anser – grey geese and white geese
  - Genus Asarcornis – white-winged duck
  - Genus Aythya – pochards, scaup, etc.
  - Genus Biziura – musk ducks
  - Genus Branta – black geese
  - Genus Bucephala – goldeneyes
  - Genus Cairina – muscovy duck
  - Genus Callonetta – ringed teal
  - Genus Cereopsis – Cape Barren goose
  - Genus Chenonetta – maned duck
  - Genus Chloephaga – sheldgoose
  - Genus Clangula – long-tailed duck
  - Genus Coscoroba – coscoroba swan
  - Genus Cyanochen – blue-winged goose
  - Genus Cygnus – true swans
  - Genus Dendrocygna – whistling ducks
  - Genus Heteronetta – black-headed duck
  - Genus Histrionicus – harlequin duck (includes Ocyplonessa)
  - Genus Hymenolaimus – blue duck
  - Genus Lophodytes – hooded merganser
  - Genus Lophonetta – crested duck
  - Genus Malacorhynchus – pink-eared ducks
  - Genus Mareca – wigeons and gadwalls
  - Genus Marmaronetta – marbled duck
  - Genus Melanitta – scoters
  - Genus Merganetta – torrent duck
  - Genus Mergellus – smew
  - Genus Mergus – mergansers
  - Genus Neochen
  - Genus Netta – larger pochard allies
  - Genus Nettapus – pygmy geese
  - Genus Nomonyx – masked duck
  - Genus Oxyura – stiff-tailed ducks
  - Genus Plectropterus – spur-winged goose
  - Genus Polysticta – Steller's eider
  - Genus Pteronetta – Hartlaub's duck
  - Genus Radjah – radjah shelduck
  - Genus Salvadorina – Salvadori's teal
  - Genus Sarkidiornis – comb duck
  - Genus Sibirionetta – Baikal teal
  - Genus Somateria – eiders
  - Genus Spatula – shovelers
  - Genus Speculanas – bronze-winged duck
  - Genus Stictonetta – freckled duck
  - Genus Tachyeres – steamer ducks
  - Genus Tadorna – shelducks
  - Genus Thalassornis – white-backed duck
- Family Anseranatidae - magpie-goose
  - Genus Anseranas

== Apodiformes ==
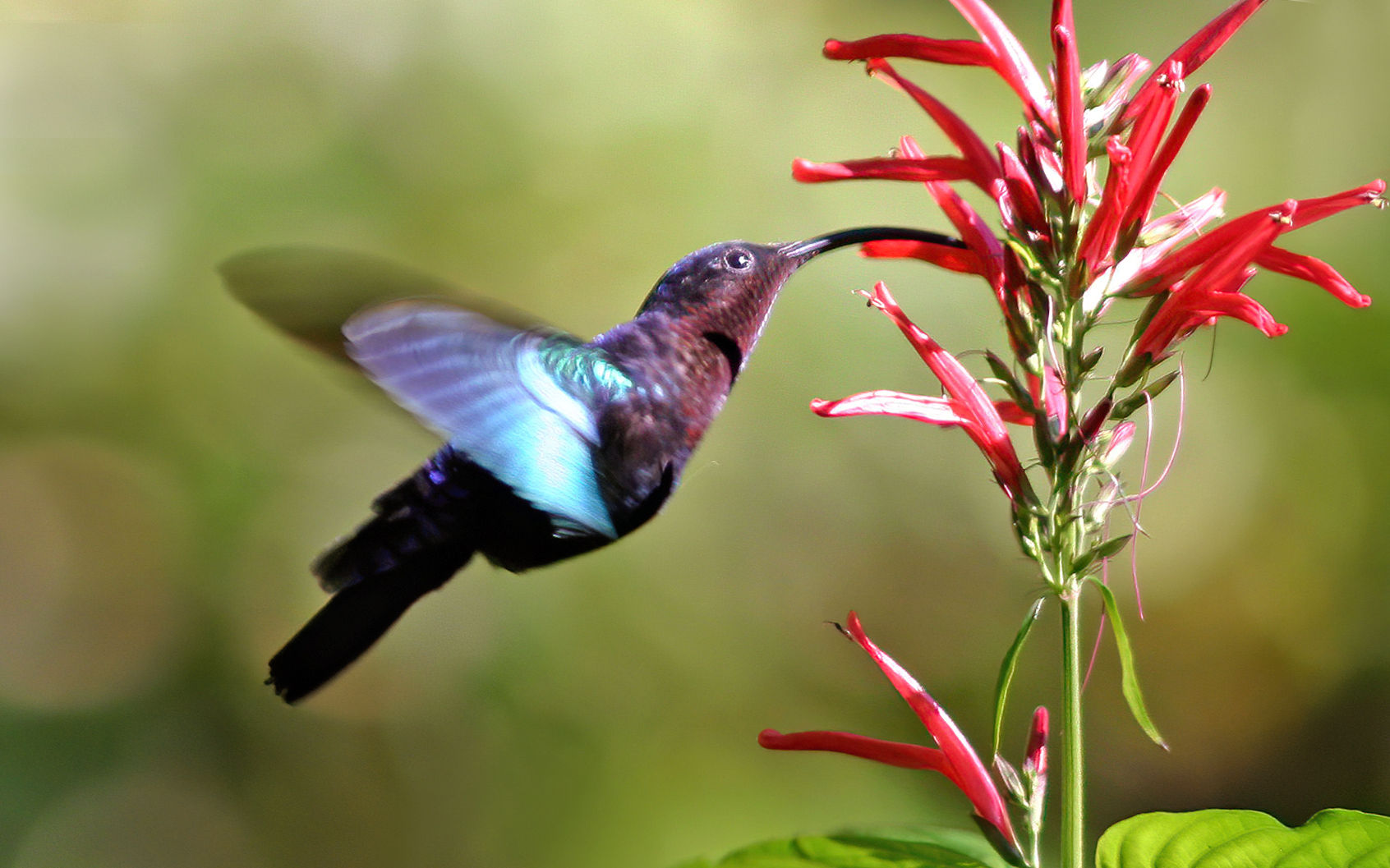
Purple-throated carib feeding at a flower

Swifts, treeswifts and hummingbirds

- Family Apodidae – swifts
  - Genus Aerodramus
  - Genus Aeronautes
  - Genus Apus
  - Genus Chaetura
  - Genus Collocalia
  - Genus Cypseloides
  - Genus Cypsiurus
  - Genus Hirundapus
  - Genus Hydrochous – giant swiftlet
  - Genus Mearnsia
  - Genus Neafrapus
  - Genus Panyptila
  - Genus Rhaphidura
  - Genus Schoutedenapus – African swiftlets
  - Genus Streptoprocne
  - Genus Tachornis
  - Genus Tachymarptis
  - Genus Telacanthura
  - Genus Zoonavena
- Family Hemiprocnidae – treeswifts
  - Genus Hemiprocne
- Family Trochilidae – hummingbirds
  - Genus Abeillia – emerald-chinned hummingbird
  - Genus Adelomyia – speckled hummingbird
  - Genus Aglaeactis – sunbeams
  - Genus Aglaiocercus – sylphs
  - Genus Amazilia (includes Agyrtria)
  - Genus Androdon – tooth-billed hummingbird
  - Genus Anopetia – broad-tipped hermit
  - Genus Anthocephala – blossomcrowns
  - Genus Anthracothorax – mangos
  - Genus Aphantochroa – sombre hummingbird
  - Genus Archilochus
  - Genus Atthis
  - Genus Augastes – visorbearers
  - Genus Avocettula – fiery-tailed awlbill
  - Genus Basilinna
  - Genus Boissonneaua – coronets
  - Genus Calliphlox – Calliphlox woodstars
  - Genus Calothorax – Calothorax sheartails
  - Genus Calypte
  - Genus Campylopterus – sabrewings
  - Genus Chaetocercus – Chaetocercus woodstars
  - Genus Chalcostigma – Chalcostigma thornbills
  - Genus Chalybura – plumeleteers
  - Genus Chlorestes – blue-chinned sapphire
  - Genus Chlorostilbon – typical emeralds
  - Genus Chrysolampis – ruby-topaz hummingbird
  - Genus Chrysuronia – golden-tailed sapphire
  - Genus Clytolaema – Brazilian ruby
  - Genus Coeligena – incas and starfrontlets
  - Genus Colibri – violet-ears
  - Genus Cyanophaia – blue-headed hummingbird
  - Genus Cynanthus
  - Genus Damophila – violet-bellied hummingbird
  - Genus Discosura – thorntails
  - Genus Doricha – typical sheartails
  - Genus Doryfera – lancebills
  - Genus Elvira – elvira emeralds
  - Genus Ensifera – sword-billed hummingbird
  - Genus Eriocnemis – typical pufflegs
  - Genus Eugenes
  - Genus Eulampis – caribs
  - Genus Eulidia – Chilean woodstar
  - Genus Eupetomena – swallow-tailed hummingbird
  - Genus Eupherusa
  - Genus Eutoxeres – sicklebills
  - Genus Florisuga – jacobins
  - Genus Glaucis
  - Genus Goethalsia – pirre hummingbird
  - Genus Goldmania – violet-capped hummingbird
  - Genus Haplophaedia – Haplophaedia pufflegs
  - Genus Heliactin – horned sungem
  - Genus Heliangelus – sunangels
  - Genus Heliodoxa – brilliants
  - Genus Heliomaster – starthroats
  - Genus Heliothryx – fairies
  - Genus Hylocharis – typical sapphires
  - Genus Hylonympha – scissor-tailed hummingbird
  - Genus Klais – violet-headed hummingbird
  - Genus Lafresnaya – mountain velvetbreast
  - Genus Lampornis – typical mountaingems
  - Genus Lamprolaima – garnet-throated hummingbird
  - Genus Lepidopyga
  - Genus Lesbia – trainbearers
  - Genus Leucippus
  - Genus Leucochloris – white-throated hummingbird
  - Genus Loddigesia – marvelous spatuletail
  - Genus Lophornis – coquettes
  - Genus Mellisuga
  - Genus Metallura – metaltails
  - Genus Microchera – snowcap
  - Genus Microstilbon – slender-tailed woodstar
  - Genus Myrmia – short-tailed woodstar
  - Genus Myrtis – purple-collared woodstar
  - Genus Ocreatus – booted racket-tails
  - Genus Opisthoprora – mountain avocetbill
  - Genus Oreonympha – bearded mountaineer
  - Genus Oreotrochilus – hillstars
  - Genus Orthorhyncus – Antillean crested hummingbird
  - Genus Oxypogon – bearded helmetcrests
  - Genus Panterpe – fiery-throated hummingbird
  - Genus Patagona – giant hummingbird
  - Genus Phaeochroa – scaly-breasted hummingbird
  - Genus Phaethornis – typical hermits
  - Genus Phlogophilus – piedtails
  - Genus Polyonymus – bronze-tailed comet
  - Genus Polytmus – goldenthroats
  - Genus Pterophanes – great sapphirewing
  - Genus Ramphodon – saw-billed hermit
  - Genus Ramphomicron – typical thornbills
  - Genus Rhodopis – oasis hummingbird
  - Genus Sappho – red-tailed comet
  - Genus Schistes – wedgebills (sometimes included in Augastes)
  - Genus Selasphorus
  - Genus Sephanoides – firecrowns
  - Genus Stephanoxis – plovercrests
  - Genus Sternoclyta – violet-chested hummingbird
  - Genus Taphrolesbia – grey-bellied comet
  - Genus Taphrospilus – many-spotted hummingbird
  - Genus Thalurania – woodnymphs
  - Genus Thaumastura – Peruvian sheartail
  - Genus Threnetes – barbthroats
  - Genus Tilmatura – sparkling-tailed woodstar
  - Genus Topaza – topazes
  - Genus Trochilus – streamertails
  - Genus Urochroa – white-tailed hillstar
  - Genus Urosticte – whitetips

== Apterygiformes ==
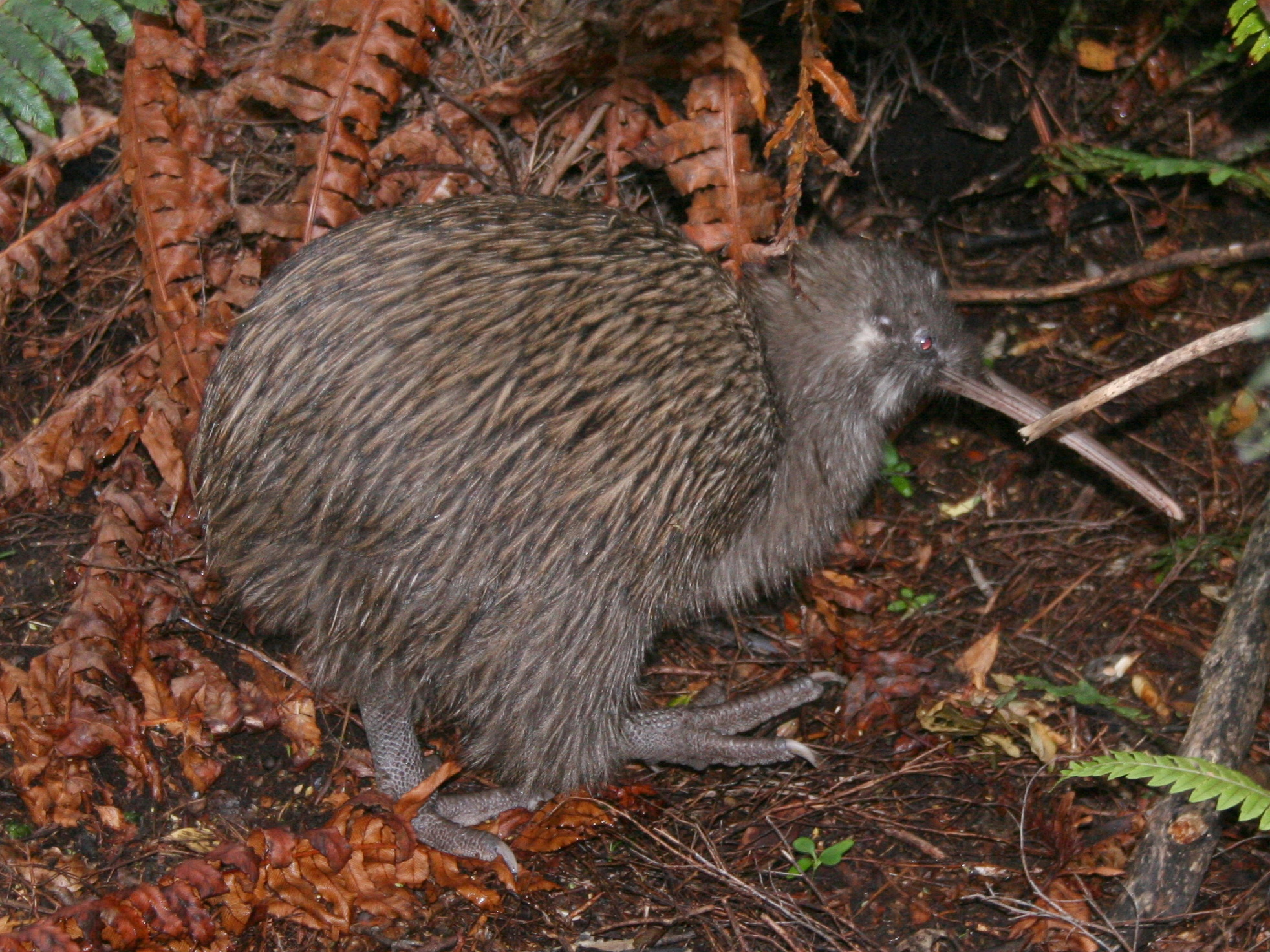
A southern brown kiwi.

- Family Apterygidae
  - Genus Apteryx – kiwi

== Bucerotiformes ==
Hornbills, hoopoes, and wood-hoopoes

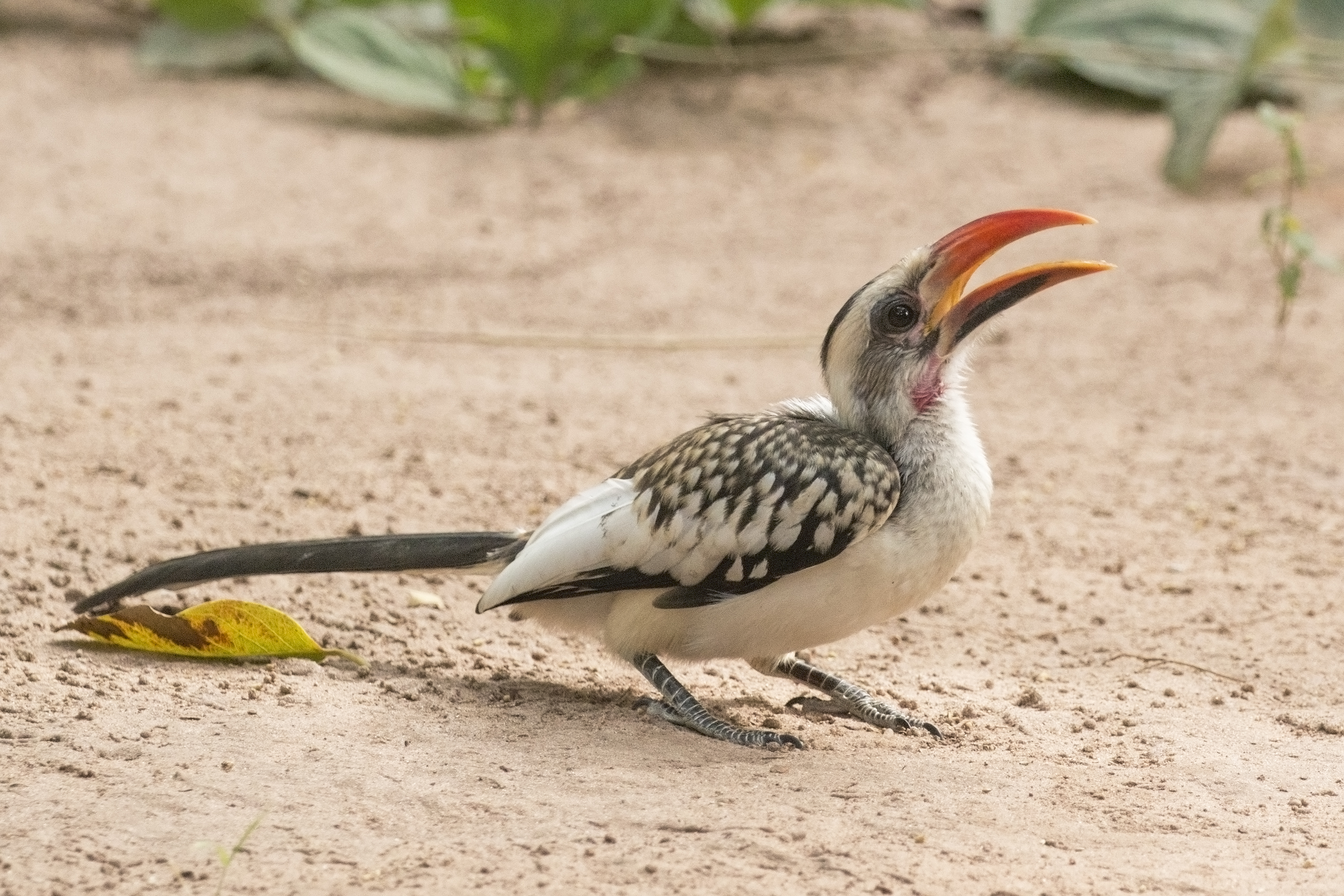
A western red-billed hornbill.

- Family Bucerotidae
  - Genus Aceros – rufous-necked hornbill
  - Genus Anorrhinus – brown hornbill
  - Genus Anthracoceros – pied hornbill
  - Genus Berenicornis – white-crowned hornbill
  - Genus Buceros
  - Genus Bycanistes
  - Genus Ceratogymna – casqued hornbill
  - Genus Lophoceros
  - Genus Ocyceros – grey hornbill
  - Genus Penelopides
  - Genus Rhinoplax – helmeted hornbill
  - Genus Rhyticeros (sometimes included in Aceros)
  - Genus Tockus
  - Genus Tropicranus – white-crested hornbill
- Family Bucorvidae
  - Genus Bucorvus – ground hornbills
- Family Phoeniculidae
  - Genus Phoeniculus – wood hoopoes
  - Genus Rhinopomastus – scimitarbills
- Family Upupidae
  - Genus Upupa – hoopoes

== Caprimulgiformes ==
Nightjars, nighthawks, potoos, oilbirds, frogmouths and owlet-nightjars

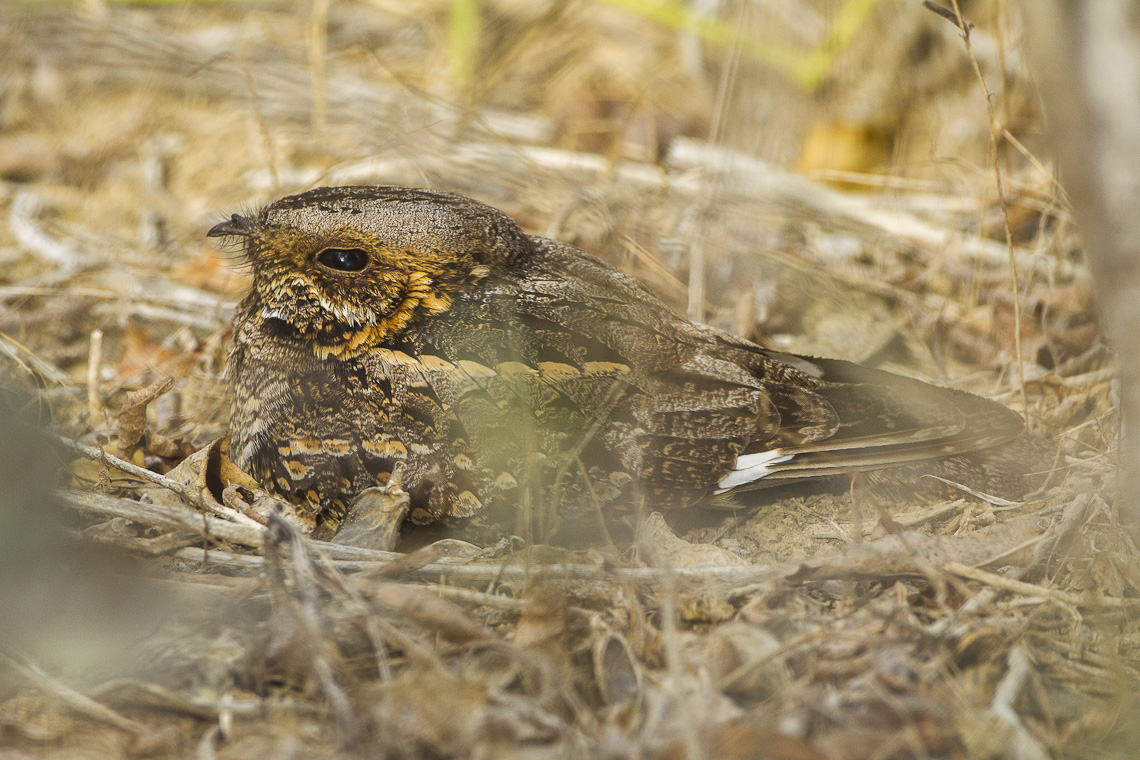
The Madagascan nightjar is restricted to the islands of Madagascar and the Seychelles.

- Family Aegothelidae – owlet-nightjars
  - Genus Aegotheles
- Family Caprimulgidae – nightjars
  - Genus Antrostomus
  - Genus Caprimulgus
  - Genus Chordeiles
  - Genus Eleothreptus
  - Genus Eurostopodus
  - Genus Gactornis – collared nightjar
  - Genus Hydropsalis
  - Genus Lurocalis
  - Genus Lyncornis
  - Genus Macropsalis – long-trained nightjar
  - Genus Nyctidromus
  - Genus Nyctiphrynus
  - Genus Nyctipolus
  - Genus Nyctiprogne
  - Genus Phalaenoptilus – common poorwill
  - Genus Setopagis
  - Genus Siphonorhis
  - Genus Systellura
  - Genus Uropsalis
- Family Nyctibiidae – potoos
  - Genus Nyctibius
- Family Podargidae – frogmouths
  - Genus Batrachostomus
  - Genus Podargus
  - Genus Rigidipenna – Solomons frogmouth
- Family Steatornithidae – oilbird
  - Genus Steatornis

== Cariamiformes ==
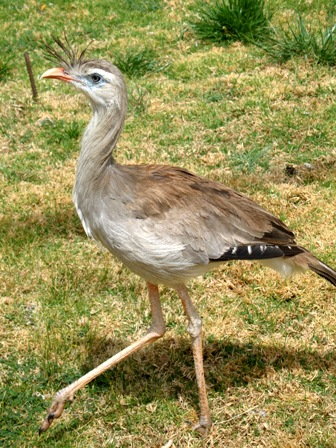
Red-legged seriema, Cariama cristata

- Family Cariamidae – seriemas
  - Genus Cariama
  - Genus Chunga

== Casuariiformes ==
Cassowaries and emus

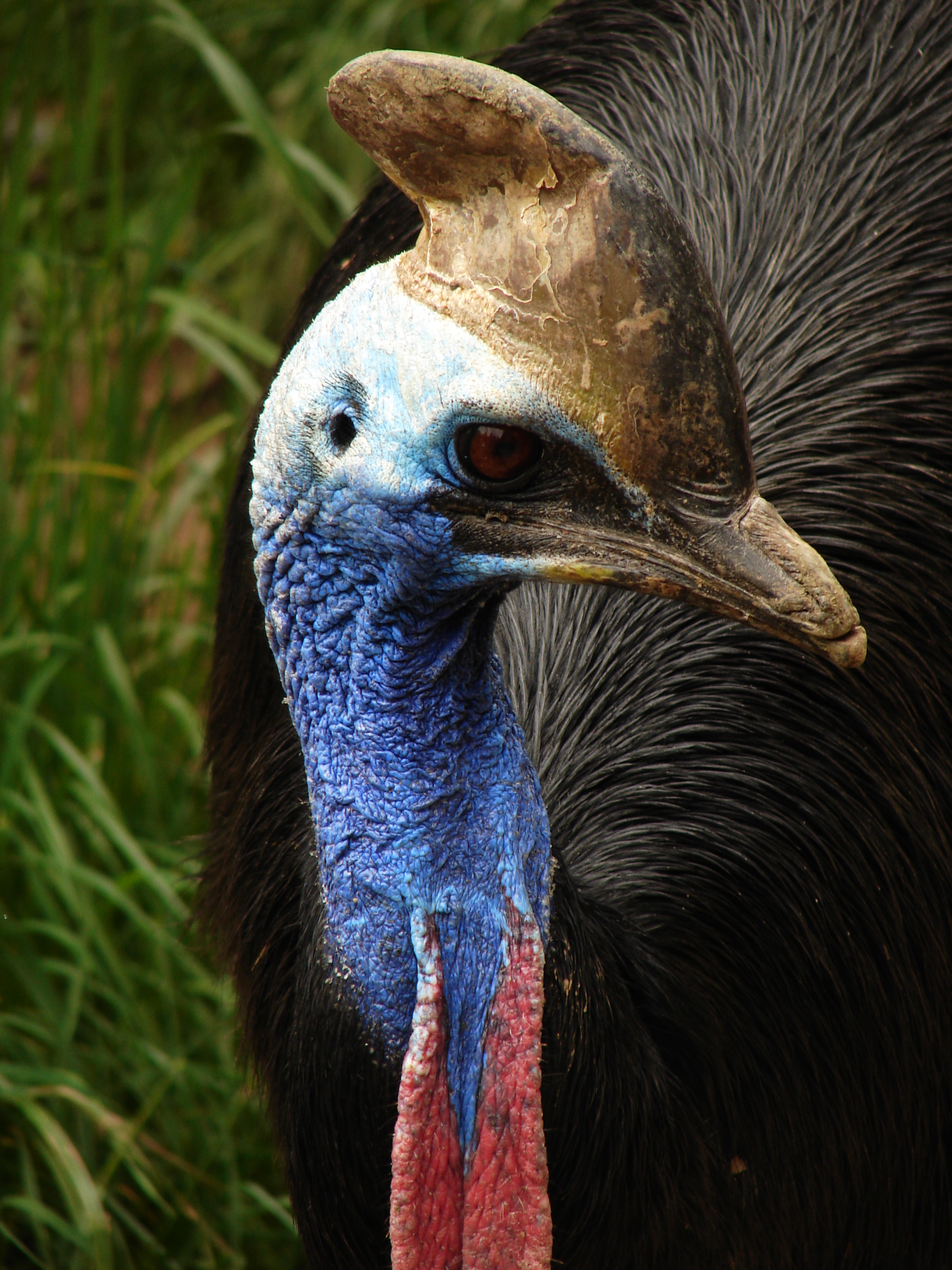
Southern cassowary

- Family Casuariidae
  - Genus Casuarius – cassowary
  - Genus Dromaius – emu

== Cathartiformes ==
New World vultures

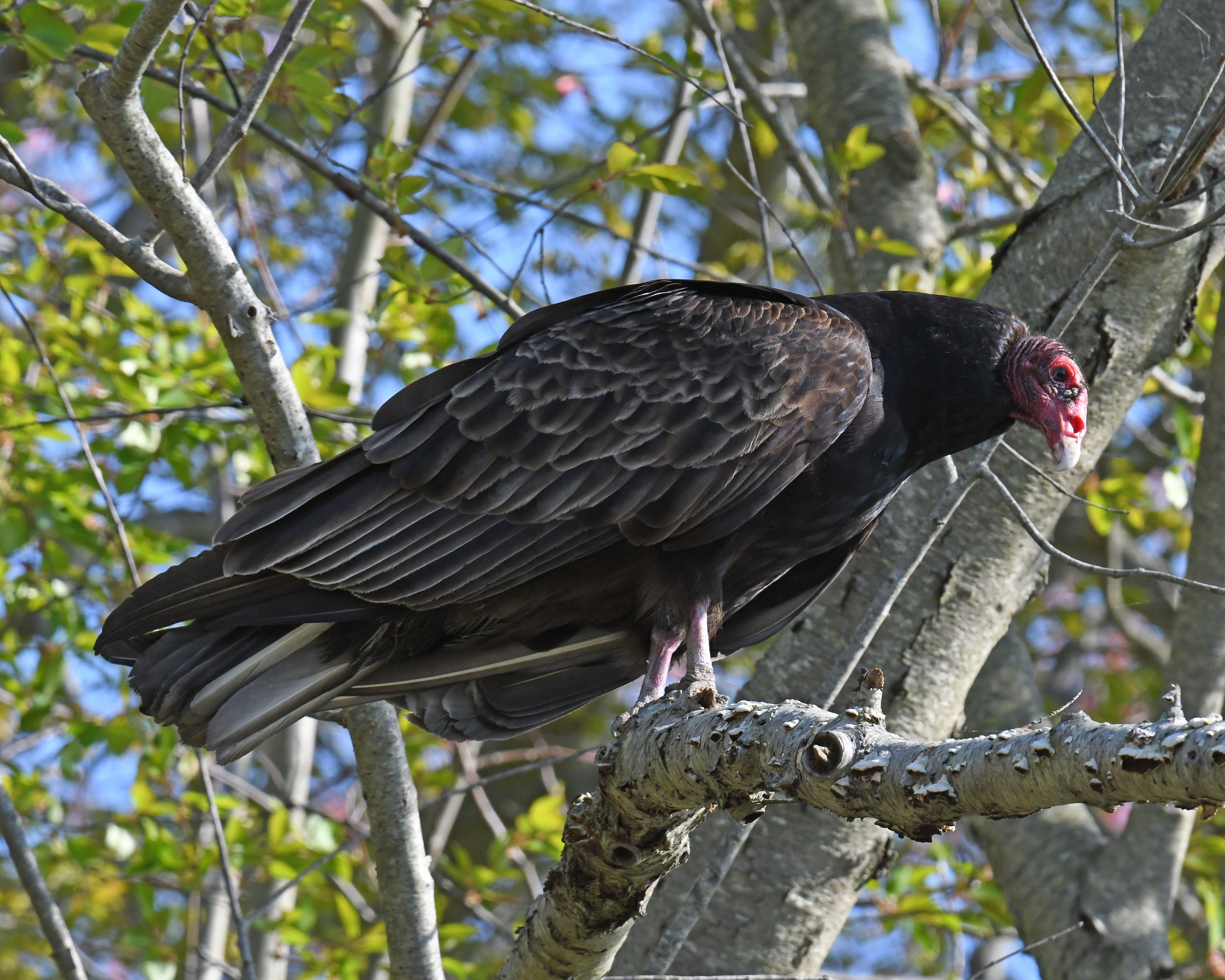
Turkey vulture (Cathartes aura)

- Family Cathartidae
  - Genus Cathartes
  - Genus Coragyps – black vulture
  - Genus Gymnogyps – California condor
  - Genus Sarcoramphus – king vulture
  - Genus Vultur – Andean condor

== Charadriiformes ==
Plovers, lapwings, seagulls, puffins, auks, waders, sandpipers, buttonquails, stilts, avocets, ibisbills, woodcocks, skuas, etc.

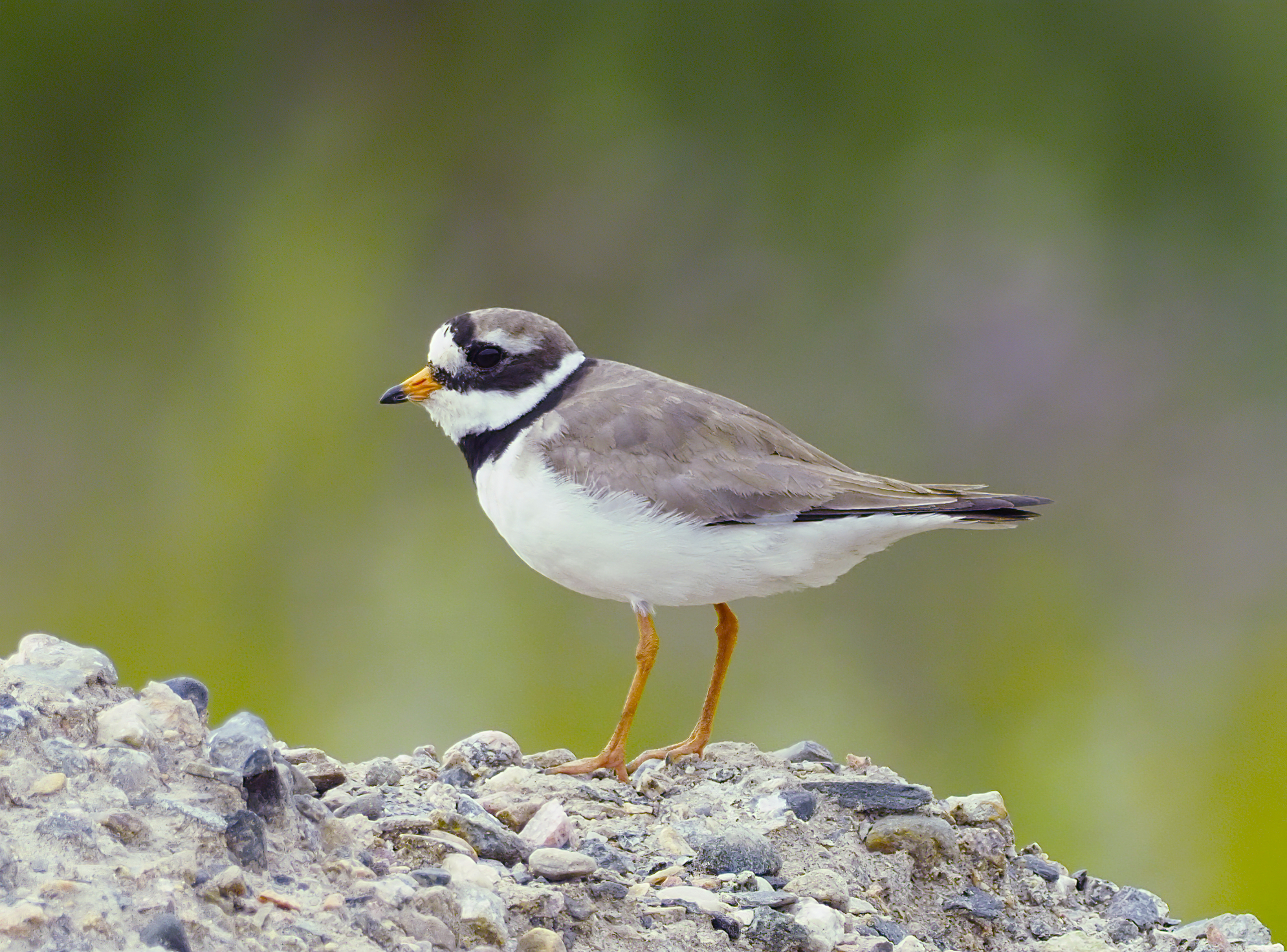
Common ringed plover (Charadrius hiaticula)

- Family Alcidae – auks, guillemots, murres, puffins, and allies
  - Genus Aethia – auklets
  - Genus Alca – razorbill
  - Genus Alle – little auk
  - Genus Brachyramphus – murrelets
  - Genus Cepphus – guillemots
  - Genus Cerorhinca – rhinoceros auklet
  - Genus Fratercula – puffins
  - Genus Ptychoramphus – Cassin's auklet
  - Genus Synthliboramphus – murrelets
  - Genus Uria – murres
- Family Burhinidae – thick-knees
  - Genus Burhinus
  - Genus Esacus
- Family Charadriidae – plovers and lapwings
  - Genus Anarhynchus
  - Genus Charadrius
  - Genus Elseyornis – black-fronted dotterel
  - Genus Erythrogonys – red-kneed dotterel
  - Genus Oreopholus – tawny-throated dotterel
  - Genus Peltohyas – inland dotterel
  - Genus Phegornis – diademed sandpiper-plover
  - Genus Pluvialis – golden plovers
  - Genus Thinornis
  - Genus Vanellus – lapwings
- Family Chionididae – sheathbills
  - Genus Chionis
- Family Dromadidae – crab plover
  - Genus Dromas
- Family Glareolidae – pratincoles and coursers
  - Genus Cursorius
  - Genus Glareola
  - Genus Rhinoptilus
  - Genus Stiltia – Australian pratincole
- Family Haematopodidae – oystercatchers
  - Genus Haematopus
- Family Ibidorhynchidae – ibisbill
  - Genus Ibidorhyncha
- Family Jacanidae – jacanas
  - Genus Actophilornis
  - Genus Hydrophasianus – pheasant-tailed jacana
  - Genus Irediparra – comb-crested jacana
  - Genus Jacana
  - Genus Metopidius – bronze-winged jacana
  - Genus Microparra – lesser jacana
- Family Laridae – gulls, terns, and skimmers
  - Genus Anous – noddies
  - Genus Chlidonias – marsh terns
  - Genus Chroicocephalus – hooded gulls
  - Genus Creagrus – swallow-tailed gull
  - Genus Gelochelidon – gull-billed tern
  - Genus Gygis – white tern
  - Genus Hydrocoloeus – little gull
  - Genus Hydroprogne – Caspian tern
  - Genus Ichthyaetus
  - Genus Larosterna – Inca tern
  - Genus Larus – large white-headed gulls
  - Genus Leucophaeus
  - Genus Onychoprion
  - Genus Pagophila – ivory gull
  - Genus Phaetusa – large-billed tern
  - Genus Rhodostethia – Ross's gull
  - Genus Rissa – kittiwakes
  - Genus Rynchops – skimmers
  - Genus Sterna – typical terns
  - Genus Sternula – little terns
  - Genus Thalasseus – crested terns
  - Genus Xema – Sabine's gull
- Family Pedionomidae – plains wanderer
  - Genus Pedionomus
- Family Pluvianellidae – Magellanic plover
  - Genus Pluvianellus
- Family Pluvianidae – Egyptian plover
  - Genus Pluvianus
- Family Recurvirostridae – avocets and stilts
  - Genus Cladorhynchus – banded stilt
  - Genus Himantopus – stilts
  - Genus Recurvirostra – avocets
- Family Rostratulidae – painted-snipe
  - Genus Nycticryphes
  - Genus Rostratula
- Family Scolopacidae – snipe, sandpipers, phalaropes, and allies
  - Genus Actitis – sandpipers
  - Genus Arenaria – turnstones
  - Genus Bartramia – upland sandpiper
  - Genus Calidris – stints
  - Genus Coenocorypha – Austral snipe
  - Genus Gallinago – snipe
  - Genus Limnodromus – dowitchers
  - Genus Limosa – godwits
  - Genus Lymnocryptes – jack snipe
  - Genus Numenius – curlews
  - Genus Phalaropus – phalaropes
  - Genus Prosobonia – Polynesian sandpiper
  - Genus Scolopax – woodcock
  - Genus Tringa – shanks
  - Genus Xenus – Terek sandpiper
- Family Stercorariidae – skuas
  - Genus Stercorarius
- Family Thinocoridae – seedsnipe
  - Genus Attagis
  - Genus Thinocorus
- Family Turnicidae – buttonquail
  - Genus Ortyxelos
  - Genus Turnix

== Ciconiiformes ==
Storks, openbills, and jabiru

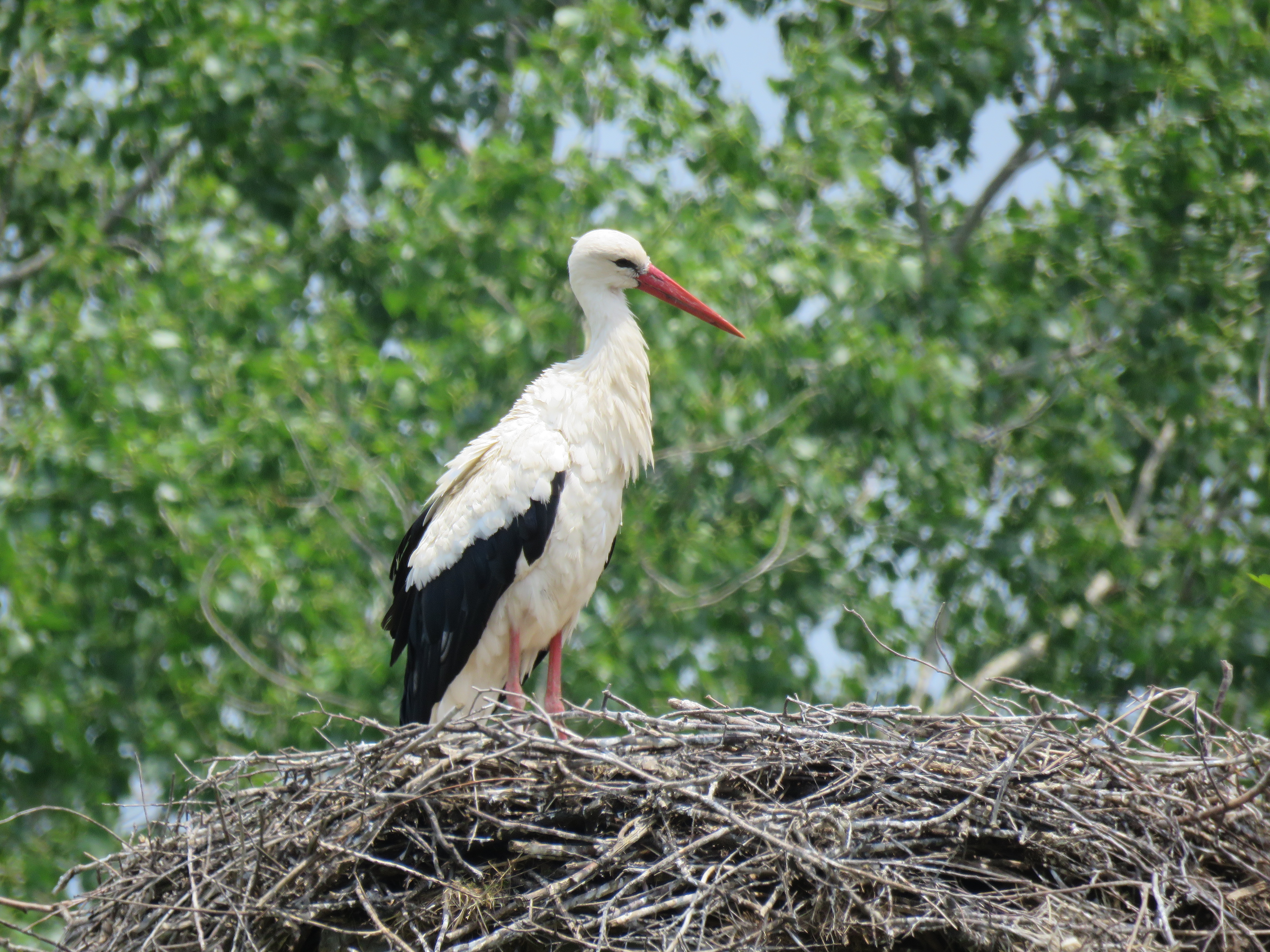
White stork (Ciconia ciconia)

- Family Ciconiidae
  - Genus Anastomus – openbills
  - Genus Ciconia – typical storks
  - Genus Ephippiorhynchus
  - Genus Jabiru
  - Genus Leptoptilos
  - Genus Mycteria

== Coliiformes ==
Mousebirds

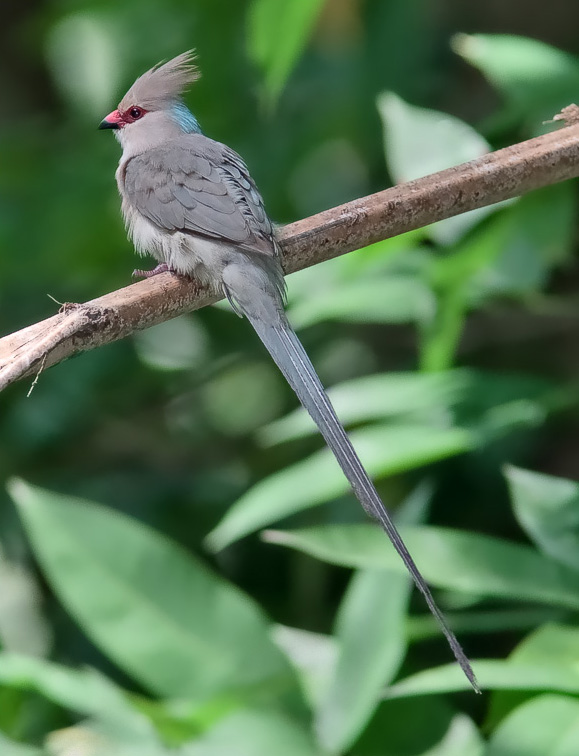
Blue-naped mousebird (Urocolius macrourus)

- Family Coliidae
  - Genus Colius
  - Genus Urocolius

== Columbiformes ==
Pigeons and doves

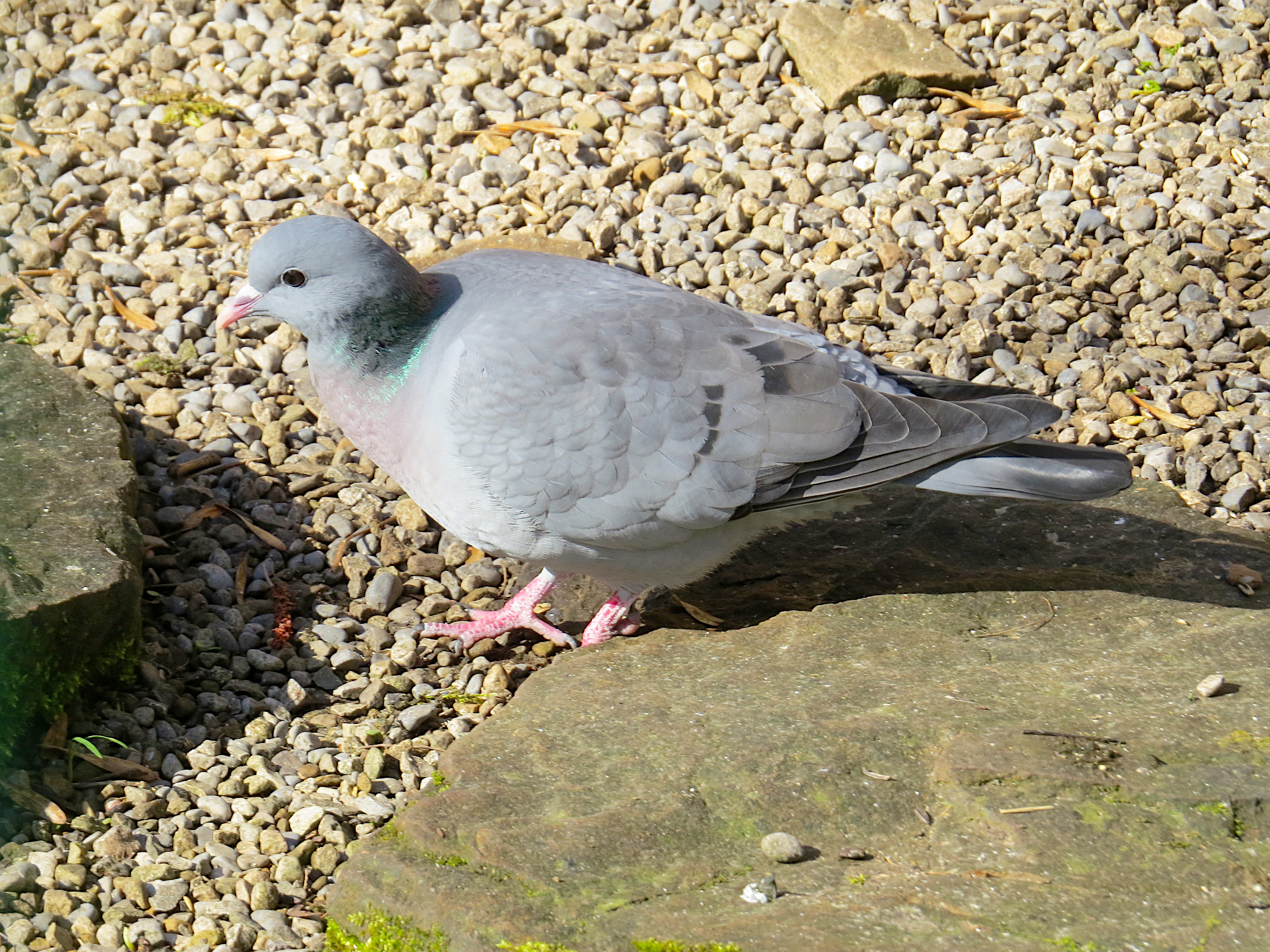
Stock dove (Columba oenas)

- Family Columbidae
  - Genus Alectroenas – blue pigeons
  - Genus Alopecoenas
  - Genus Aplopelia
  - Genus Caloenas – Nicobar pigeon
  - Genus Chalcophaps – emerald doves
  - Genus Claravis
  - Genus Columba – Old World pigeons
  - Genus Columbina
  - Genus Cryptophaps – sombre pigeon
  - Genus Didunculus – tooth-billed pigeon
  - Genus Drepanoptila
  - Genus Ducula – imperial pigeons
  - Genus Dysmoropelia – Saint Helena dove
  - Genus Gallicolumba
  - Genus Geopelia
  - Genus Geophaps
  - Genus Geotrygon – quail-doves
  - Genus Goura
  - Genus Gymnophaps – mountain pigeons
  - Genus Hemiphaga
  - Genus Henicophaps
  - Genus Leptotila
  - Genus Leptotrygon – olive-backed quail-dove
  - Genus Leucosarcia – wonga pigeon
  - Genus Lopholaimus – topknot pigeon
  - Genus Macropygia
  - Genus Metriopelia
  - Genus Nesoenas
  - Genus Ocyphaps – crested pigeon
  - Genus Oena – Namaqua dove
  - Genus Otidiphaps – pheasant pigeon
  - Genus Patagioenas – American pigeons
  - Genus Petrophassa – rock pigeons
  - Genus Phapitreron – brown dove
  - Genus Phaps
  - Genus Ptilinopus
  - Genus Reinwardtoena
  - Genus Starnoenas – blue-headed quail-dove
  - Genus Spilopelia
  - Genus Streptopelia – collared doves and turtle doves
  - Genus Treron – green pigeons
  - Genus Trugon – thick-billed ground pigeon
  - Genus Turacoena
  - Genus Turtur – African wood doves
  - Genus Uropelia – long-tailed ground dove
  - Genus Zenaida – Zenaida doves
  - Genus Zentrygon

== Coraciiformes ==
Rollers, bee eaters, todies, kingfishers, etc.

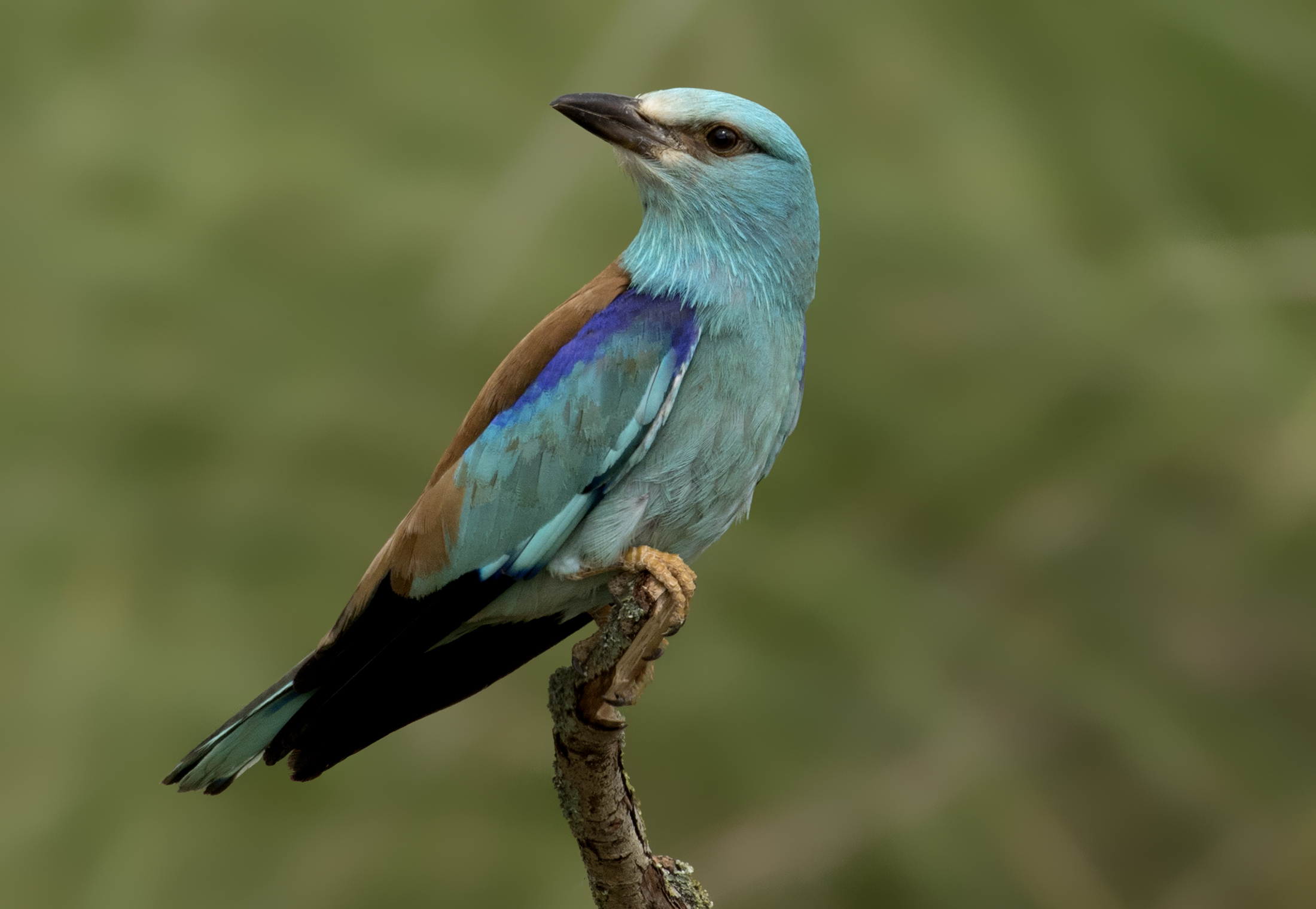
European roller (Coracias garrulus)

- Family Alcedinidae – kingfishers
  - Genus Actenoides
  - Genus Alcedo – typical or river kingfishers
  - Genus Caridonax – glittering kingfisher
  - Genus Ceryle – pied kingfisher
  - Genus Ceyx
  - Genus Chloroceryle – American green kingfisher
  - Genus Cittura – lilac kingfisher
  - Genus Clytoceyx
  - Genus Corythornis
  - Genus Dacelo – kookaburras
  - Genus Halcyon
  - Genus Ispidina
  - Genus Lacedo
  - Genus Megaceryle
  - Genus Melidora – hook-billed kingfisher
  - Genus Pelargopsis
  - Genus Syma
  - Genus Tanysiptera – paradise kingfisher
  - Genus Todirhamphus
- Family Brachypteraciidae – ground rollers
  - Genus Atelornis
  - Genus Brachypteracias – short-legged ground roller
  - Genus Geobiastes – scaly ground roller
  - Genus Uratelornis – long-tailed ground roller
- Family Coraciidae – rollers
  - Genus Coracias
  - Genus Eurystomus
- Family Meropidae – bee-eaters
  - Genus Meropogon – purple-bearded bee-eater
  - Genus Merops
  - Genus Nyctyornis
- Family Momotidae – motmots
  - Genus Aspatha – blue-throated motmot
  - Genus Baryphthengus
  - Genus Electron
  - Genus Eumomota – turquoise-browed motmot
  - Genus Hylomanes – tody motmot
  - Genus Momotus
- Family Todidae – todies
  - Genus Todus

== Cuculiformes ==
Cuckoos, anis, etc.

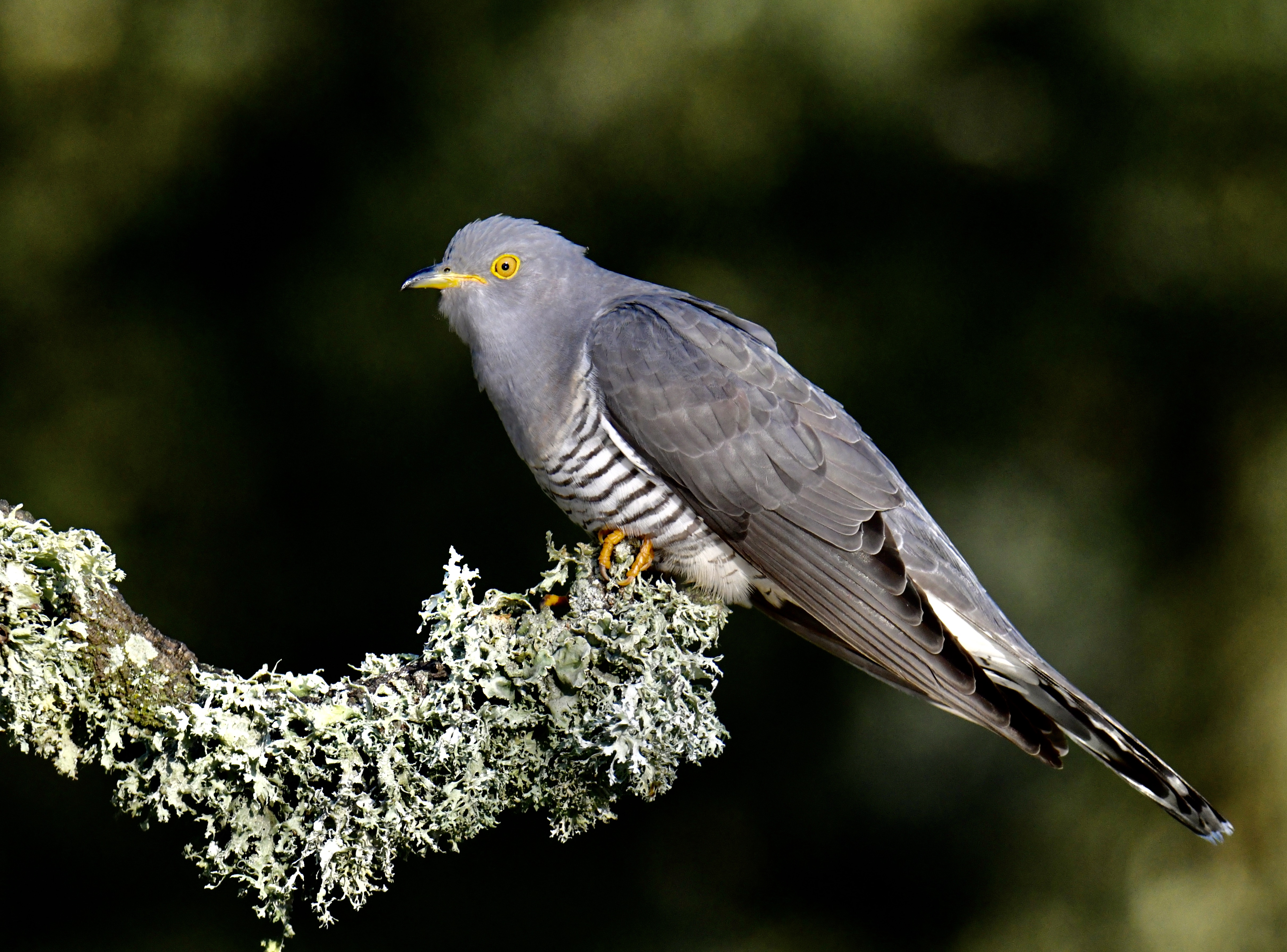
Common cuckoo (Cuculus canorus)

- Family Cuculidae
  - Genus Cacomantis
  - Genus Carpococcyx – Asian ground-cuckoos
  - Genus Centropus – coucals
  - Genus Cercococcyx – long-tailed cuckoos
  - Genus Ceuthmochares – yellowbills
  - Genus Chrysococcyx – bronze cuckoos
  - Genus Clamator
  - Genus Coccycua – formerly in Coccyzus and Piaya, includes Micrococcyx
  - Genus Coccyzus – includes Saurothera and Hyetornis
  - Genus Coua – coua
  - Genus Crotophaga – anis
  - Genus Cuculus – typical cuckoos
  - Genus Dromococcyx
  - Genus Eudynamys – typical koels
  - Genus Geococcyx – roadrunners
  - Genus Guira – guira cuckoo
  - Genus Hierococcyx – hawk-cuckoos
  - Genus Microdynamis – dwarf koel
  - Genus Morococcyx – lesser ground cuckoo
  - Genus Neomorphus – Neotropical ground-cuckoos
  - Genus Pachycoccyx – thick-billed cuckoo
  - Genus Phaenicophaeus – typical malkohas
  - Genus Piaya
  - Genus Rhinortha – Raffles's malkoha
  - Genus Scythrops – channel-billed cuckoo
  - Genus Surniculus – drongo-cuckoos
  - Genus Tapera – striped cuckoo
  - Genus Urodynamis – Pacific long-tailed cuckoo

== Eurypygiformes ==
Sunbitterns and kagu

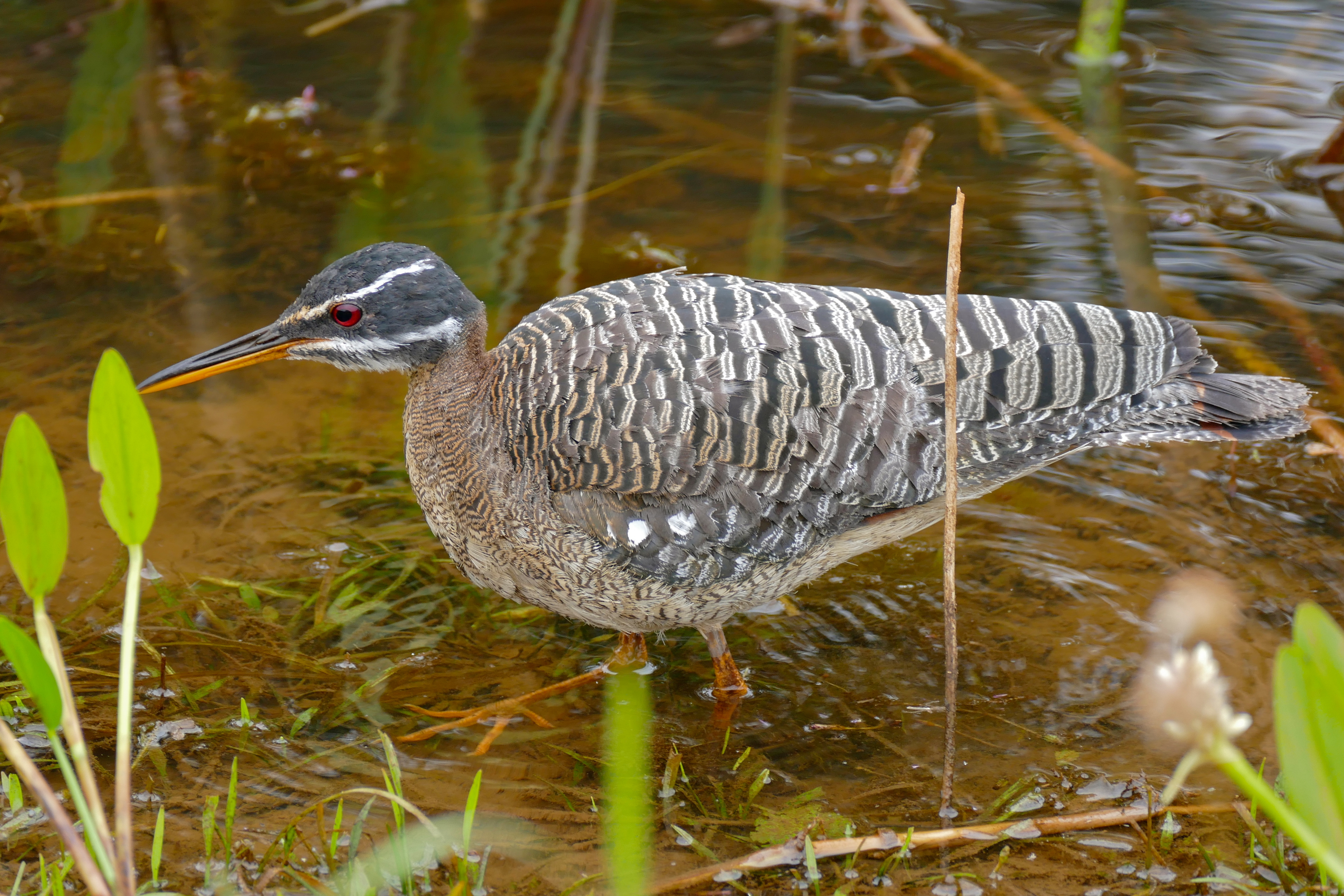
Sunbittern (Eurypiga helias)

- Family Eurypygidae – sunbittern
  - Genus Eurypyga
- Family Rhynochetidae – kagu
  - Genus Rhynochetos

== Falconiformes ==
Falcons and caracara

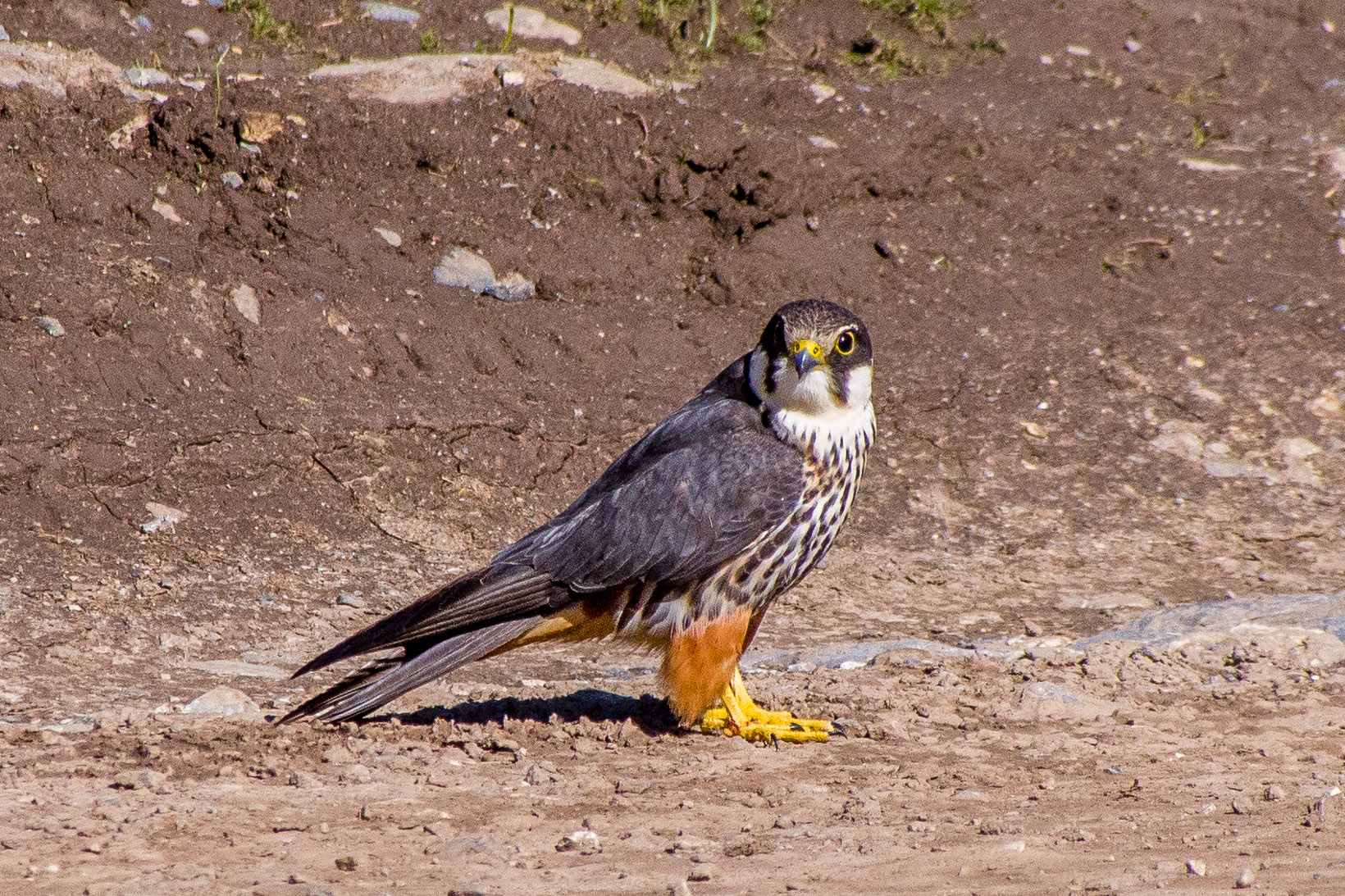
Eurasian Hobby (Falco subbuteo)

- Family Falconidae
  - Genus Caracara – crested caracaras
  - Genus Daptrius – black caracara
  - Genus Falco – true falcons, hobbies and kestrels
  - Genus Herpetotheres – laughing falcon
  - Genus Ibycter – red-throated caracara
  - Genus Micrastur – forest falcons
  - Genus Microhierax – typical falconets
  - Genus Milvago – brown caracaras
  - Genus Phalcoboenus – Andean and southern South American caracaras
  - Genus Polihierax – pygmy falcons
  - Genus Spiziapteryx – spot-winged falconet

== Galliformes ==
Gamebirds

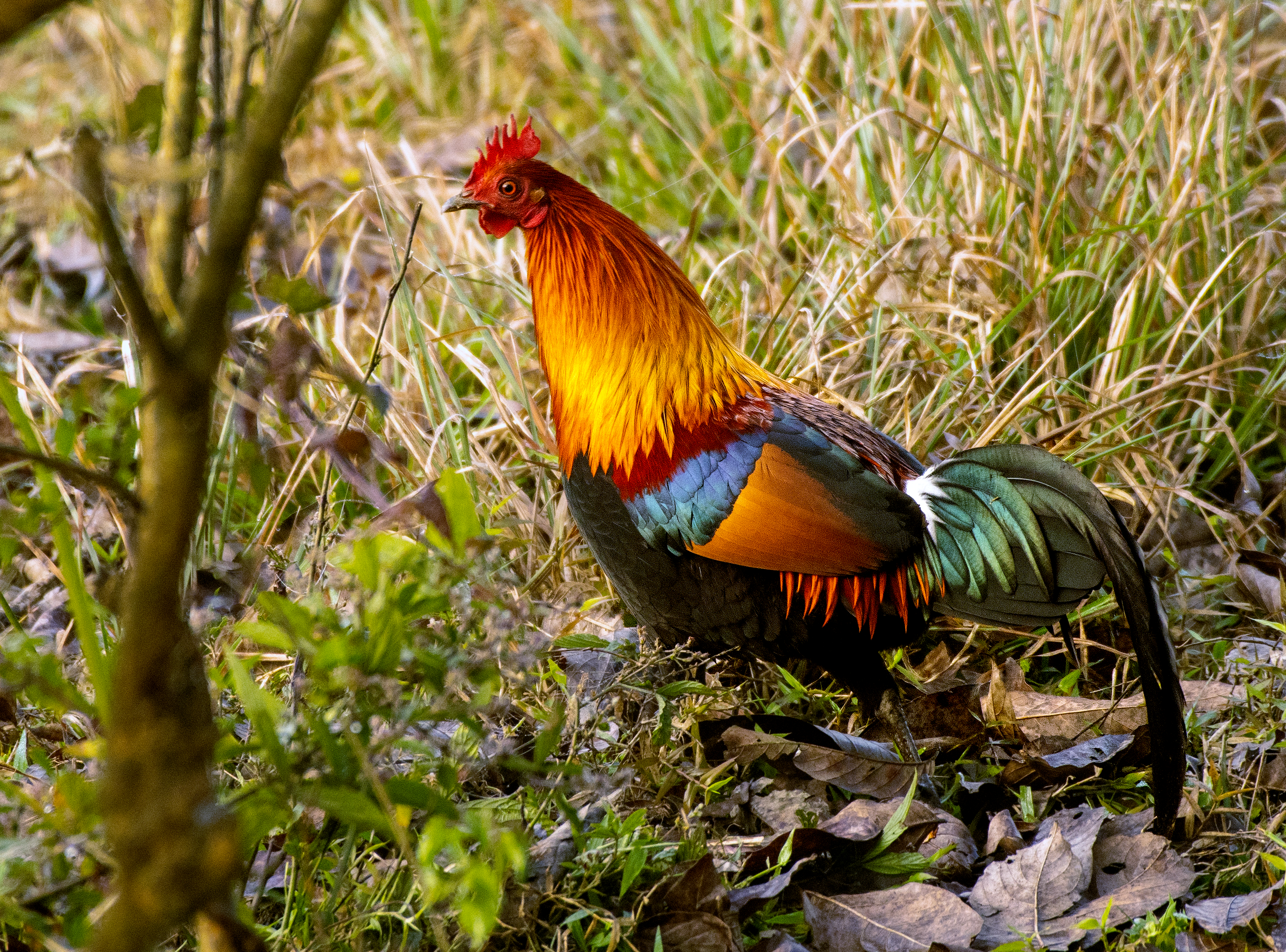
Red junglefowl (Gallus gallus)

- Family Cracidae
  - Genus Aburria
  - Genus Chamaepetes
  - Genus Crax – curassows
  - Genus Mitu – curassows
  - Genus Nothocrax – nocturnal curassow
  - Genus Oreophasis – horned guan
  - Genus Ortalis – chachalacas
  - Genus Pipile – piping guan
  - Genus Pauxi – helmeted curassows
  - Genus Penelope
  - Genus Penelopina
- Family Megapodiidae
  - Genus Aepypodius
  - Genus Alectura – Australian brushturkey
  - Genus Eulipoa – Moluccan megapode
  - Genus Leipoa
  - Genus Macrocephalon – maleo
  - Genus Megapodius – scrubfowl
  - Genus Talegalla
- Family Numididae
  - Genus Acryllium
  - Genus Agelastes
  - Genus Guttera
  - Genus Numida – helmeted guineafowl
- Family Odontophoridae
  - Genus Callipepla
  - Genus Colinus – bobwhites
  - Genus Cyrtonyx
  - Genus Dactylortyx – singing quail
  - Genus Dendrortyx
  - Genus Odontophorus – wood quail
  - Genus Oreortyx – mountain quail
  - Genus Philortyx – banded quail
  - Genus Ptilopachus
  - Genus Rhynchortyx – tawny-faced quail
- Family Phasianidae
  - Genus Afropavo – Congo peafowl
  - Genus Alectoris – rock partridges
  - Genus Ammoperdix – see-see and sand partridge
  - Genus Anurophasis – Snow Mountain quail
  - Genus Arborophila – hill partridge
  - Genus Argusianus – great argus
  - Genus Bambusicola – bamboo partridge
  - Genus Bonasa – ruffed grouse
  - Genus Caloperdix – ferruginous partridge
  - Genus Catreus – cheer pheasant
  - Genus Centrocercus – sage grouse
  - Genus Chrysolophus – ruffed pheasant
  - Genus Coturnix – true quail
  - Genus Crossoptilon – eared pheasant
  - Genus Dendragapus
  - Genus Falcipennis
  - Genus Francolinus – true francolins
  - Genus Galloperdix – Indian spurfowl
  - Genus Gallus – junglefowl
  - Genus Haematortyx – crimson-headed partridge
  - Genus Ithaginis – blood pheasant
  - Genus Lagopus – ptarmigans
  - Genus Lerwa – snow partridge
  - Genus Lophophorus – monal
  - Genus Lophura – gallopheasants
  - Genus Lyrurus – black grouse
  - Genus Margaroperdix – Madagascan partridge
  - Genus Melanoperdix – black partridge
  - Genus Meleagris – turkeys
  - Genus Ophrysia – Himalayan quail
  - Genus Pavo – peafowl
  - Genus Peliperdix
  - Genus Perdicula – bush quail
  - Genus Perdix – true partridges
  - Genus Phasianus – typical pheasants
  - Genus Polyplectron – peacock-pheasant
  - Genus Pternistis – African spurfowls
  - Genus Pucrasia – koklass pheasant
  - Genus Rheinardia – crested argus
  - Genus Rhizothera
  - Genus Rollulus – crested partridge
  - Genus Scleroptila
  - Genus Synoicus
  - Genus Syrmaticus – long-tailed pheasants
  - Genus Tetrao – capercaillie
  - Genus Tetraogallus – snowcocks
  - Genus Tetraophasis – monal-partridge
  - Genus Tetrastes
  - Genus Tragopan – horned pheasant
  - Genus Tympanuchus – prairie chickens
  - Genus Xenoperdix – forest partridges

== Gaviiformes ==
Divers or loons

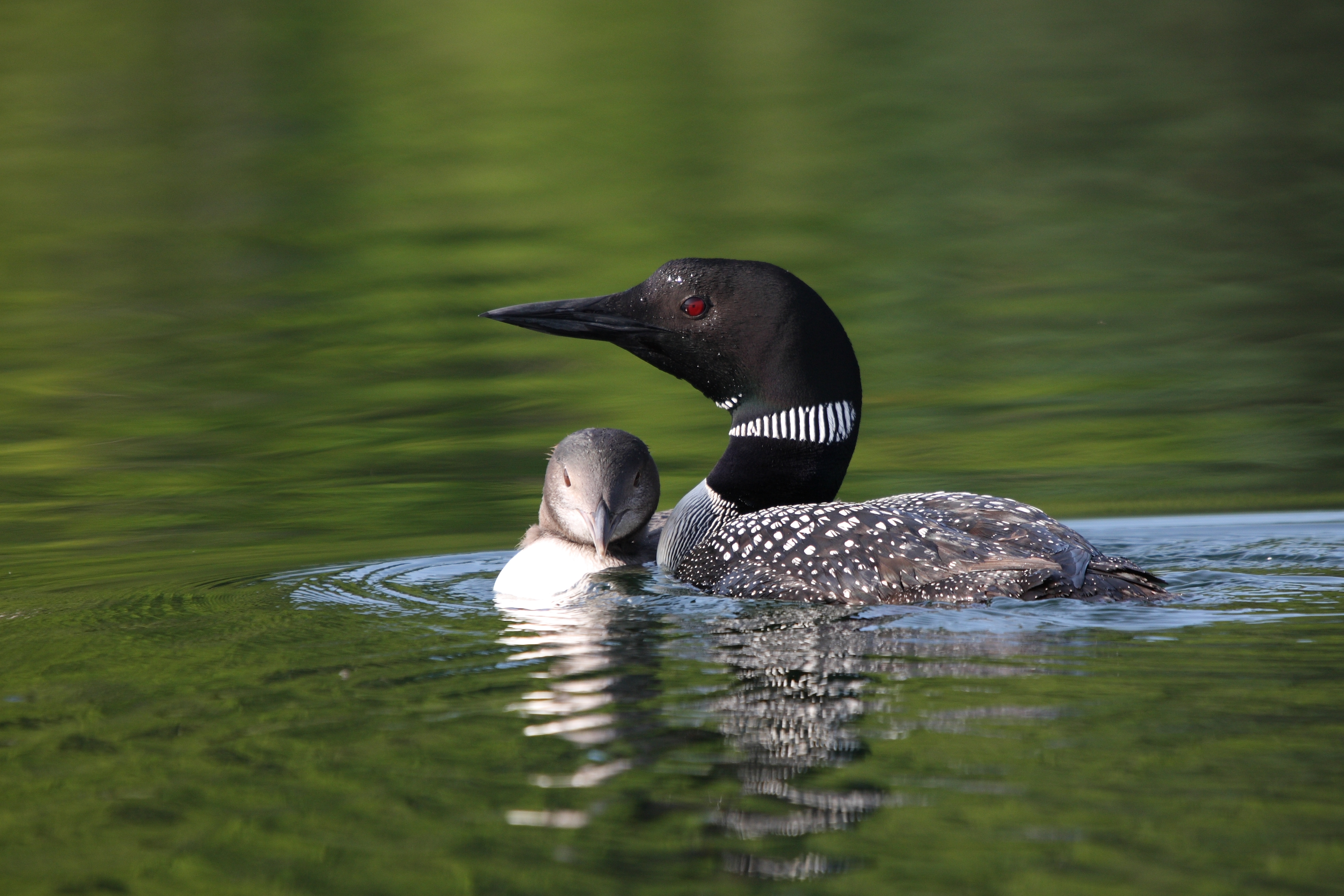
Common loon (Gavia immer)

- Family Gaviidae
  - Genus Gavia – divers or loons

== Gruiformes ==
Cranes, crakes, rails, wood-rails, fluftais, gallinules, limpkin, trumpeters, and finfoots

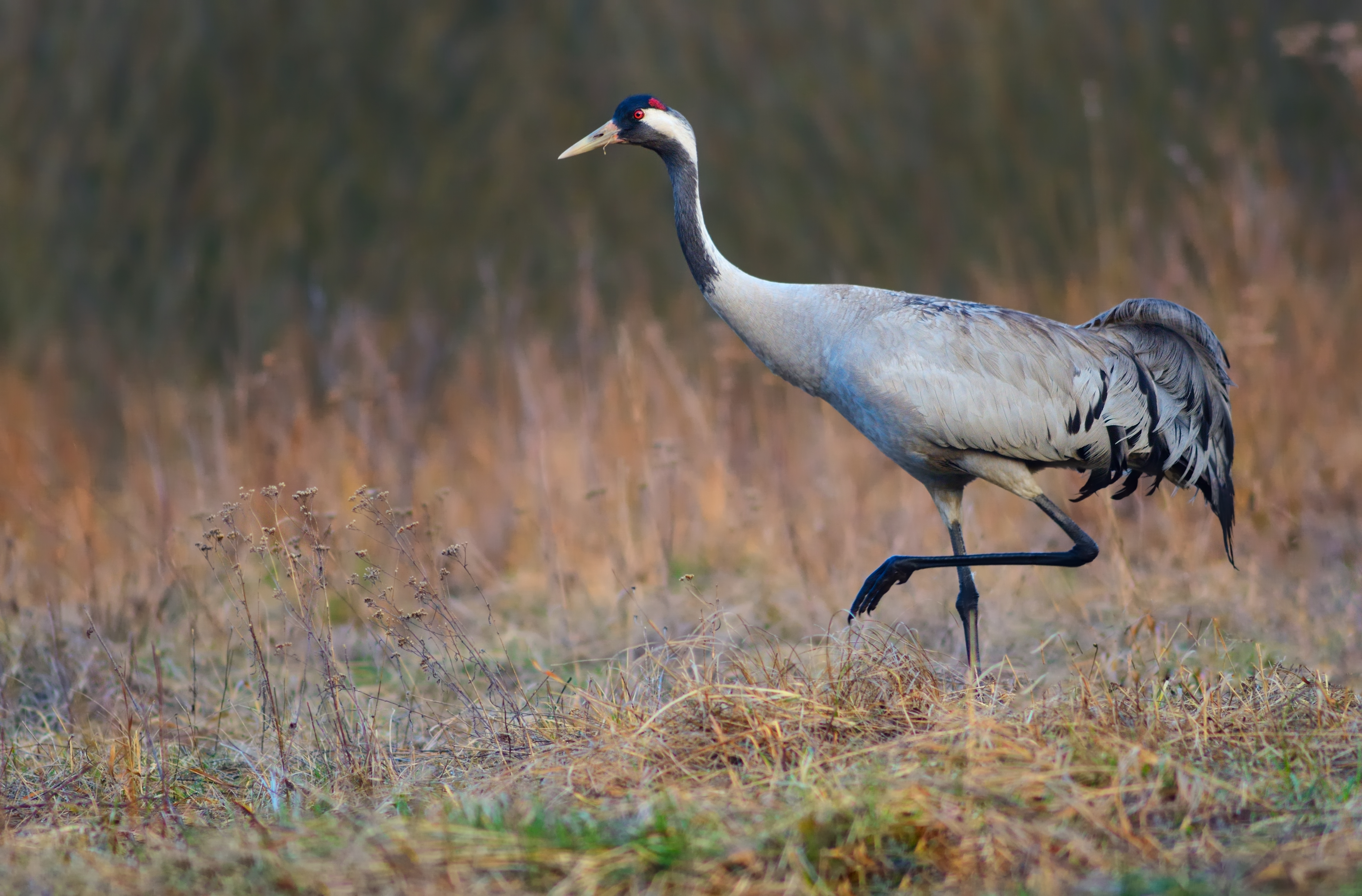
Common crane (Grus grus)

- Family Aramidae – limpkin
  - Genus Aramus
- Family Gruidae – cranes
  - Genus Antigone
  - Genus Balearica
  - Genus Grus – cranes
  - Genus Leucogeranus – Siberian crane
- Family Heliornithidae – finfoots
  - Genus Heliopais – masked finfoot
  - Genus Heliornis – sungrebe
  - Genus Podica – African finfoot
- Family Psophiidae
  - Genus Psophia – trumpeters
- Family Rallidae – crakes, moorhens, gallinules, and rails
  - Genus Aenigmatolimnas – striped crake
  - Genus Amaurolimnas – uniform crake
  - Genus Amaurornis – bush-hens
  - Genus Anurolimnas
  - Genus Aramides
  - Genus Aramidopsis – snoring rail
  - Genus Atlantisia – Inaccessible Island rail
  - Genus Cabalus – Chatham rail
  - Genus Coturnicops – barred-backed crake
  - Genus Crecopsis – African crake
  - Genus Crex – corn crake
  - Genus Cyanolimnas – Zapata rail
  - Genus Diaphorapteryx – Hawkins's rail
  - Genus Dryolimnas
  - Genus Eulabeornis – chestnut rail
  - Genus Fulica – coots
  - Genus Gallicrex – watercock
  - Genus Gallinula – moorhens
  - Genus Gallirallus
  - Genus Gymnocrex – bare-faced rails
  - Genus Habroptila – invisible rail
  - Genus Hapalocrex – yellow-breasted crake
  - Genus Himantornis – Nkulengu rail
  - Genus Laterallus – ruddy crake
  - Genus Lewinia
  - ?Genus Limnocrex (synonym of Laterallus?)
  - Genus Megacrex – New Guinea flightless rail
  - Genus Micropygia – ocellated crake
  - Genus Mundia – Ascension crake
  - Genus Mustelirallus
  - Genus Nesoclopeus
  - Genus Paragallinula – lesser moorhen
  - Genus Pardirallus
  - Genus Poliolimnas
  - Genus Porphyrio – swamphens
  - Genus Porphyriops – spot-flanked gallinule
  - Genus Porzana
  - Genus Rallicula – forest rails
  - Genus Rallina – chestnut rails
  - Genus Rallus
  - Genus Rougetius – Rouget's rail
  - Genus Rufirallus – russet-crowned crake
  - Genus Tribonyx – native-hens
  - Genus Zapornia
- Family Sarothruridae
  - Genus Canirallus – grey-throated rail and wood rails
  - Genus Sarothrura – flufftails

== Leptosomiformes ==
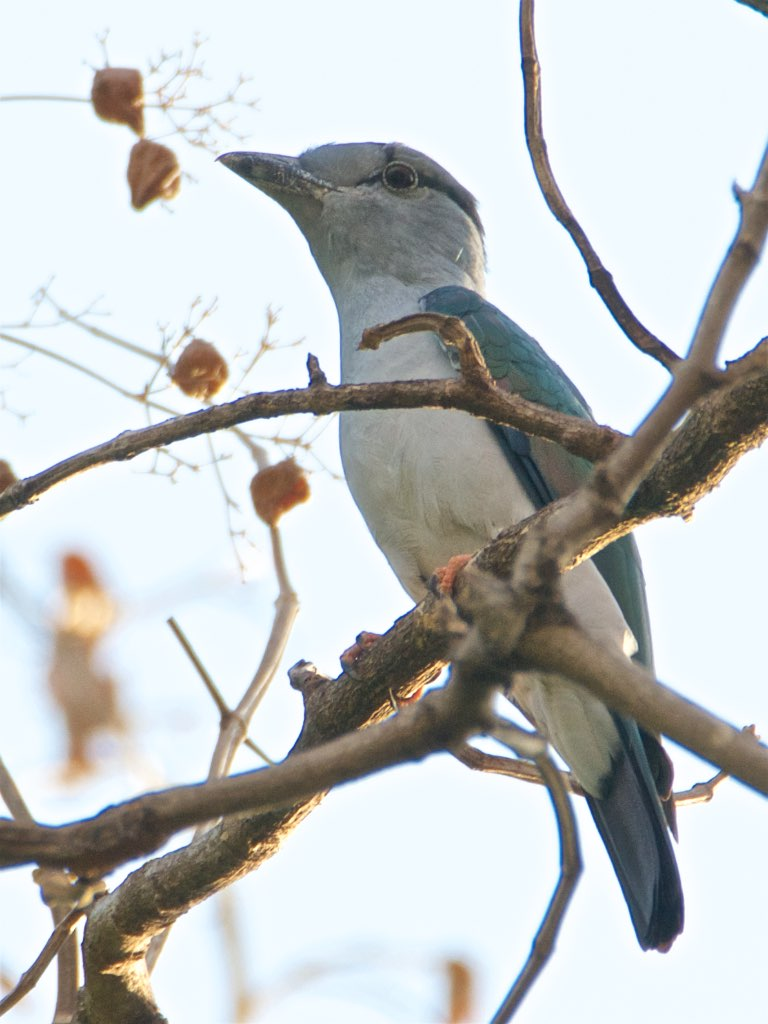
The cuckoo roller exhibits a pronounced sexual dichromatism in the plumage.

- Family Leptosomidae
  - Genus Leptosomus – cuckoo roller

== Mesitornithiformes ==
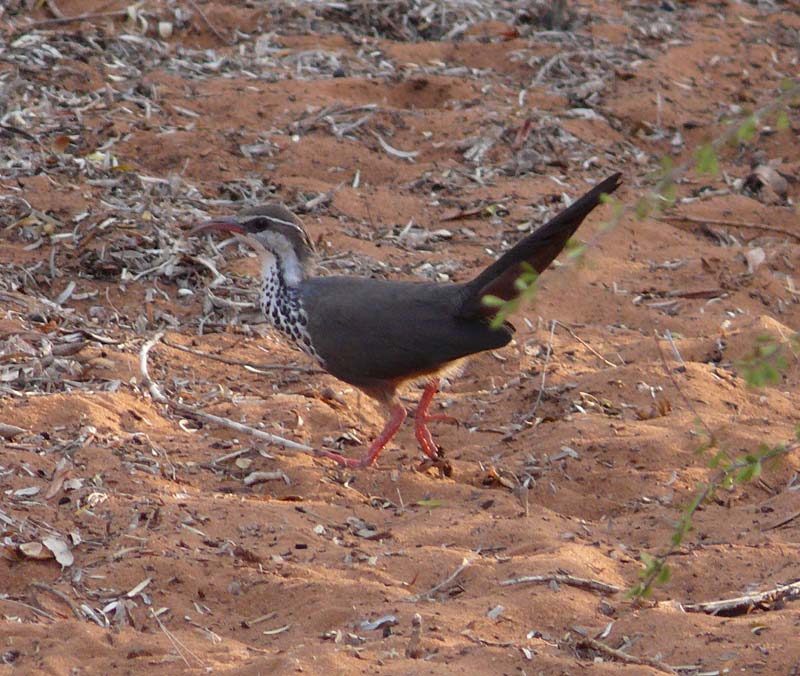
Subdesert mesite, Monias benschi

- Family Mesitornithidae – mesites
  - Genus Mesitornis
  - Genus Monias – subdesert mesite

== Musophagiformes ==
Turacos and go-away-birds

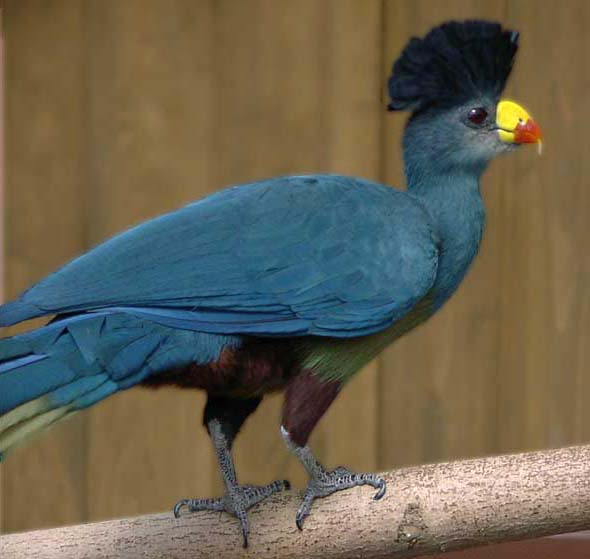
Great blue turaco Corythaeola cristata

- Family Musophagidae
  - Genus Corythaeola – great blue turaco
  - Genus Corythaixoides – go-away-birds
  - Genus Crinifer – plantain-eaters
  - Genus Musophaga
  - Genus Ruwenzorornis – Rwenzori turaco
  - Genus Tauraco

== Opisthocomiformes ==
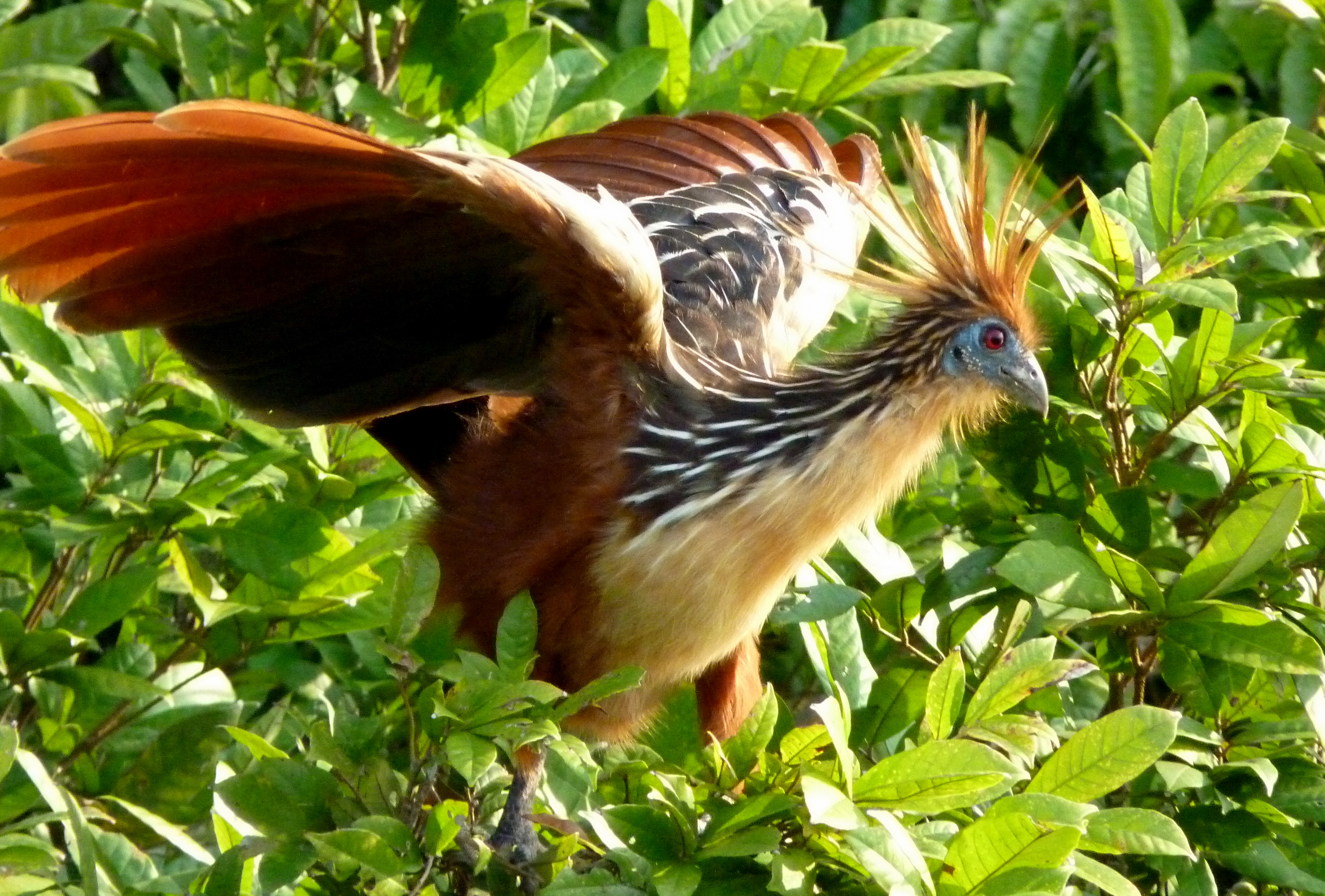
Hoatzin at Lake Sandoval, Peru

- Family Opisthocomidae
  - Genus Opisthocomus – hoatzin

== Otidiformes ==
Bustards, floricans

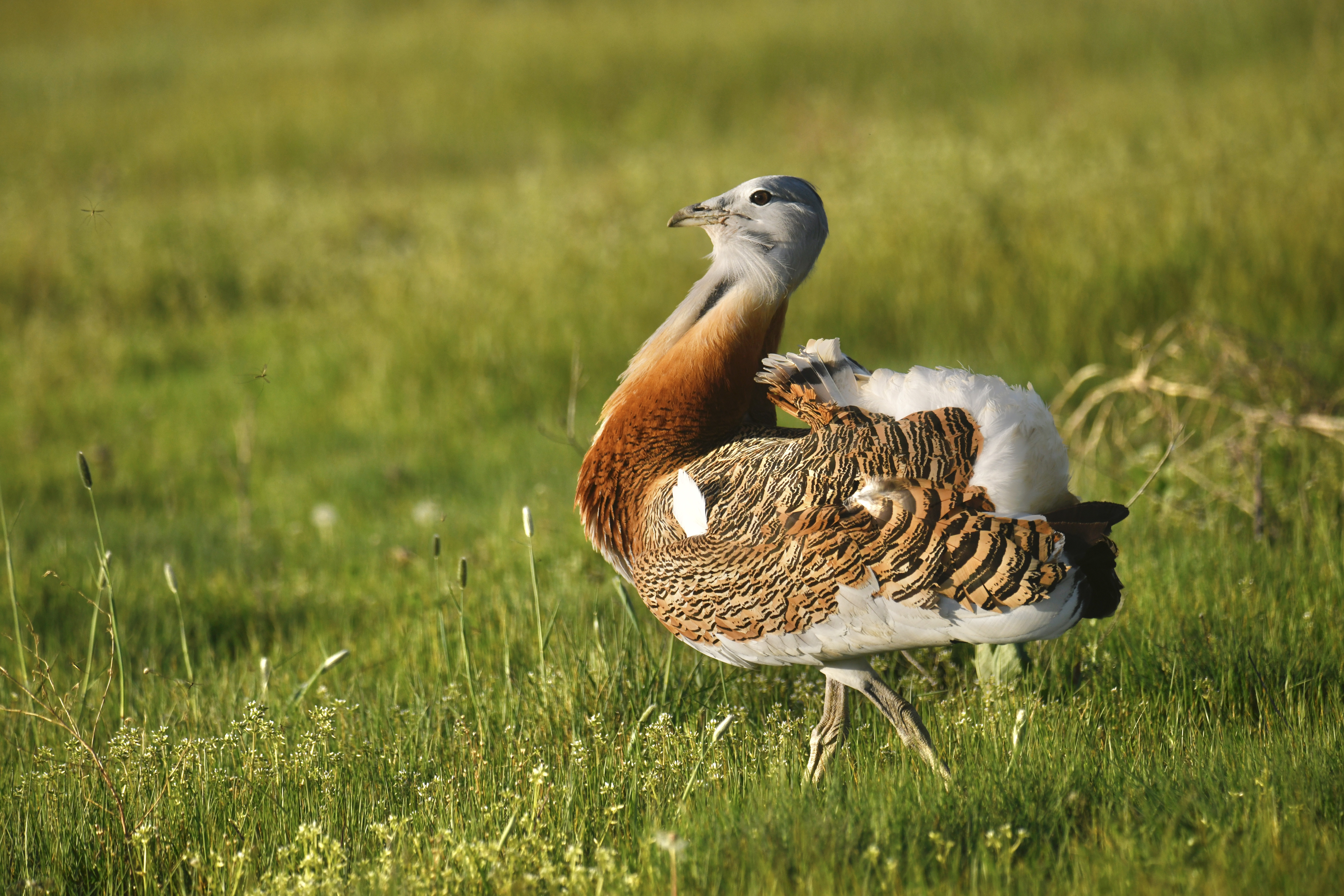
Great bustard (Otis tarda)

- Family Otididae
  - Genus Afrotis
  - Genus Ardeotis
  - Genus Chlamydotis
  - Genus Eupodotis
  - Genus Houbaropsis – Bengal florican
  - Genus Lissotis
  - Genus Lophotis
  - Genus Neotis
  - Genus Otis – great bustard
  - Genus Sypheotides
  - Genus Tetrax – little bustard

== Passeriformes ==
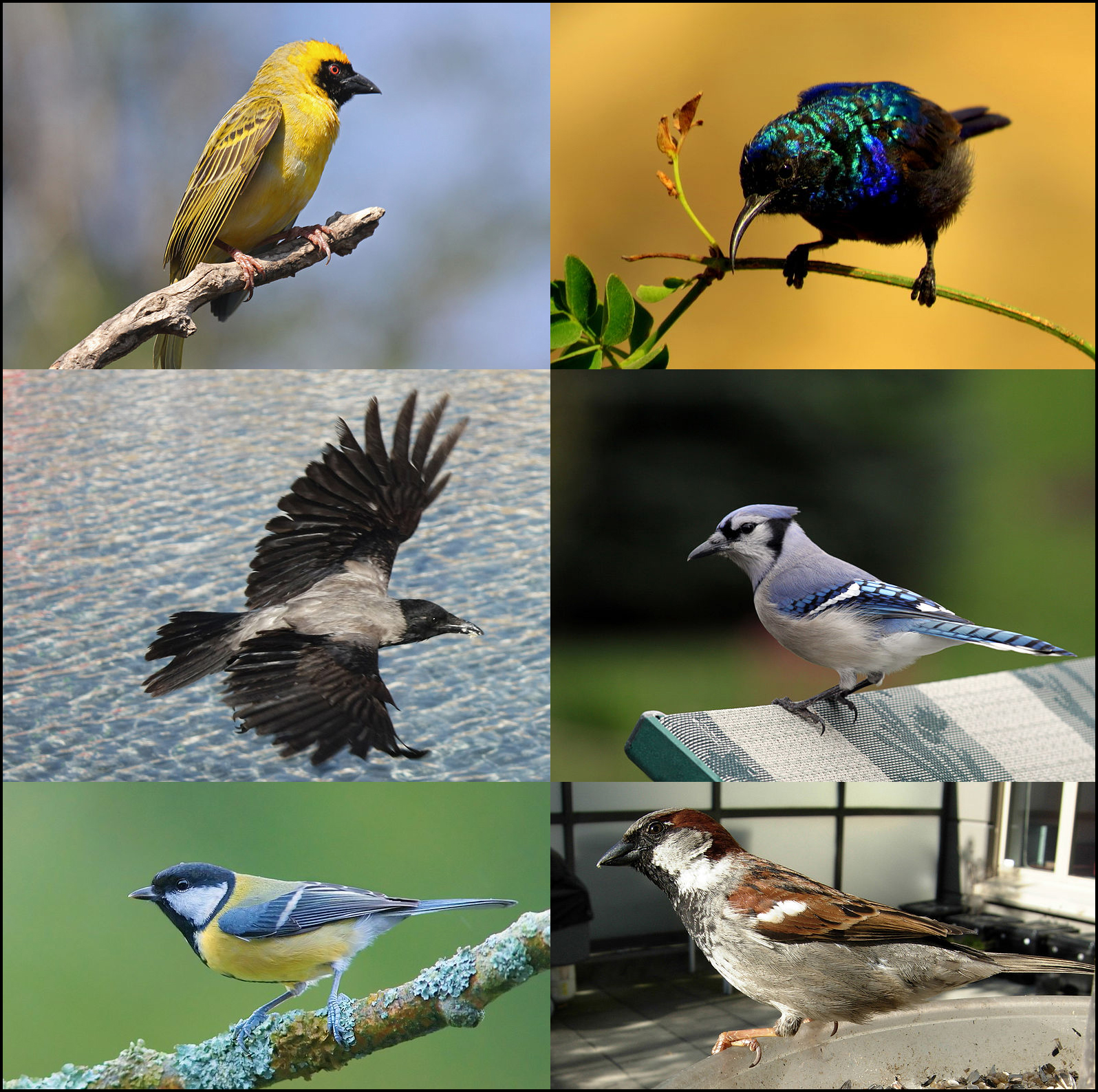
Clockwise from top right: Palestine sunbird (Cinnyris osea), blue jay (Cyanocitta cristata), house sparrow (Passer domesticus), great tit (Parus major), hooded crow (Corvus cornix), southern masked weaver (Ploceus velatus)

Passerines, the "song birds". This is the largest order of birds and contains more than half of all birds.

- Family Acanthisittidae
  - Genus Acanthisitta – rifleman
  - Genus Xenicus – New Zealand wrens
- Family Acanthizidae – scrubwrens, thornbills, and gerygones
  - Genus Acanthiza – thornbill
  - Genus Acanthornis – scrubtit
  - Genus Aethomyias – scrubwrens
  - Genus Aphelocephala – whiteface
  - Genus Calamanthus – fieldwren
  - Genus Crateroscelis
  - Genus Gerygone
  - Genus Hylacola – heathwren
  - Genus Neosericornis – yellow-throated scrubwren
  - Genus Oreoscopus – fernwren
  - Genus Origma
  - Genus Pachycare – goldenface
  - Genus Pycnoptilus – pilotbird
  - Genus Pyrrholaemus – speckled warbler
  - Genus Sericornis – scrubwrens
  - Genus Smicrornis – weebill
- Family Acrocephalidae – marsh and tree warblers
  - Genus Acrocephalus
  - Genus Calamonastides – papyrus yellow warbler
  - Genus Chloropeta
  - Genus Hippolais
  - Genus Iduna
  - Genus Nesillas
- Family Aegithalidae – long-tailed tits or bushtits
  - Genus Aegithalos
  - Genus Leptopoecile
  - Genus Psaltriparus – American bushtit
- Family Aegithinidae
  - Genus Aegithina – iora
- Family Alaudidae – larks
  - Genus Alaemon – hoopoe-lark
  - Genus Alauda – skylark
  - Genus Alaudala
  - Genus Ammomanes
  - Genus Ammomanopsis – Gray's lark
  - Genus Calandrella – short-toed lark
  - Genus Calendulauda
  - Genus Certhilauda – short-clawed lark and long-billed lark
  - Genus Chersomanes – spike-heeled lark
  - Genus Chersophilus – Dupont's lark
  - Genus Eremalauda – Dunn's lark
  - Genus Eremophila – horned lark
  - Genus Eremopterix – sparrow-larks
  - Genus Galerida – large-billed lark and crested lark
  - Genus Heteromirafra – Rudd's lark and Archer's lark
  - Genus Lullula – woodlark
  - Genus Melanocorypha
  - Genus Mirafra – larks and bushlarks
  - Genus Pinarocorys – dusky lark and rufous-rumped lark
  - Genus Ramphocoris – thick-billed lark
  - Genus Spizocorys
- Family Artamidae – woodswallows, butcherbirds, currawongs, and Australian magpie
  - Genus Artamus – woodswallows
  - Genus Cracticus
  - Genus Gymnorhina – Australian magpie
  - Genus Melloria – black butcherbird
  - Genus Peltops
  - Genus Strepera – currawongs
- Family Atrichornithidae
  - Genus Atrichornis – scrub-birds
- Family Bernieridae – Malagasy warblers
  - Genus Bernieria – Madagascan warbler
  - Genus Crossleyia – Madagascan yellowbrow
  - Genus Cryptosylvicola – cryptic warbler
  - Genus Hartertula – wedge-tailed jery
  - Genus Oxylabes – white-throated oxylabes
  - Genus Randia – Rand's warbler
  - Genus Thamnornis – thamnornis
  - Genus Xanthomixis
- Family Bombycillidae
  - Genus Bombycilla – waxwings
- Family Buphagidae
  - Genus Buphagus – oxpeckers
- Family Calcariidae – longspurs and snow buntings
  - Genus Calcarius – longspurs
  - Genus Plectrophenax – snow and McKay's buntings
  - Genus Rhynchophanes – thick-billed longspur
- Family Callaeidae – New Zealand wattlebirds
  - Genus Callaeas – kōkako
  - Genus Heteralocha – huia
  - Genus Philesturnus – saddleback
- Family Calyptophilidae
  - Genus Calyptophilus – chat-tanagers
- Family Campephagidae – cuckooshrikes and trillers
  - Genus Campephaga
  - Genus Campochaera – golden cuckooshrike
  - Genus Ceblepyris
  - Genus Celebesica – pygmy cuckooshrike
  - Genus Coracina
  - Genus Cyanograucalus – blue cuckooshrike
  - Genus Edolisoma
  - Genus Lalage
  - Genus Lobotos
  - Genus Malindangia – McGregor's cuckooshrike
  - Genus Pericrocotus – minivet
- Family Cardinalidae – cardinals and allies
  - Genus Amaurospiza
  - Genus Cardinalis
  - Genus Caryothraustes
  - Genus Chlorothraupis
  - Genus Cyanocompsa
  - Genus Cyanoloxia – glaucous-blue grosbeak
  - Genus Granatellus
  - Genus Habia
  - Genus Passerina
  - Genus Periporphyrus – red-and-black grosbeak
  - Genus Pheucticus
  - Genus Piranga
  - Genus Rhodothraupis – crimson-collared grosbeak
  - Genus Spiza – dickcissel
- Family Certhiidae – treecreepers
  - Genus Certhia
- Family Cettiidae – bush warblers and allies
  - Genus Abroscopus – abroscopus warbler
  - Genus Cettia – typical bush warblers
  - Genus Horornis
  - Genus Hylia – green hylia
  - Genus Pholidornis – tit hylia
  - Genus Phyllergates
  - Genus Tesia
  - Genus Tickellia – broad-billed warbler
  - Genus Urosphena – stubtails
- Family Chaetopidae
  - Genus Chaetops – rockjumpers
- Family Chloropseidae
  - Genus Chloropsis – leafbirds
- Family Cinclidae
  - Genus Cinclus – dippers
- Family Cisticolidae – cisticolas and allies
  - Genus Apalis
  - Genus Artisornis
  - Genus Bathmocercus – rufous warblers
  - Genus Calamonastes
  - Genus Camaroptera
  - Genus Cisticola
  - Genus Drymocichla – red-winged grey warbler
  - Genus Eminia – grey-capped warbler
  - Genus Eremomela
  - Genus Euryptila – cinnamon-breasted warbler
  - Genus Heliolais – red-winged warbler
  - Genus Hypergerus – oriole warbler
  - Genus Incana – Socotra warbler
  - Genus Malcorus – rufous-eared warbler
  - Genus Micromacronus
  - Genus Neomixis – jerys
  - Genus Oreolais
  - Genus Oreophilais – Roberts's warbler
  - Genus Orthotomus – tailorbirds
  - Genus Phragmacia – Namaqua warbler
  - Genus Phyllolais – buff-bellied warbler
  - Genus Poliolais – white-tailed warbler
  - Genus Prinia
  - Genus Scepomycter
  - Genus Schistolais
  - Genus Spiloptila – cricket warbler
  - Genus Urolais – green longtail
  - Genus Urorhipis –
- Family Climacteridae – Australian treecreeper
  - Genus Cormobates
  - Genus Climacteris
- Family Cnemophilidae – satinbirds
  - Genus Cnemophilus
  - Genus Loboparadisea – yellow-breasted satinbird
- Family Conopophagidae – gnateaters and gnatpittas
  - Genus Conopophaga
  - Genus Pittasoma
- Family Corcoracidae – Australian mudnester
  - Genus Corcorax – white-winged chough
  - Genus Struthidea – apostlebird
- Family Corvidae – crows, ravens, and jays
  - Genus Aphelocoma – scrub jays
  - Genus Calocitta – magpie-jay
  - Genus Cissa – magpies
  - Genus Corvus – crows and ravens
  - Genus Crypsirina – treepies
  - Genus Cyanocitta – jays
  - Genus Cyanocorax – jays
  - Genus Cyanolyca
  - Genus Cyanopica – magpies
  - Genus Dendrocitta – treepies
  - Genus Garrulus – jays
  - Genus Gymnorhinus – pinyon jay
  - Genus Nucifraga – nutcrackers
  - Genus Perisoreus – jays
  - Genus Pica – magpies
  - Genus Platylophus – crested jay
  - Genus Platysmurus – black magpie
  - Genus Podoces – ground jays
  - Genus Psilorhinus – brown jay
  - Genus Ptilostomus – piapiac
  - Genus Pyrrhocorax – chough
  - Genus Temnurus – ratchet-tailed treepie
  - Genus Urocissa – blue magpies
  - Genus Zavattariornis – Stresemann's bushcrow
- Family Cotingidae – cotingas and allies
  - Genus Ampelioides – scaled fruiteater
  - Genus Ampelion
  - Genus Carpodectes
  - Genus Carpornis – berryeaters
  - Genus Cephalopterus – umbrellabirds
  - Genus Conioptilon – black-faced cotinga
  - Genus Cotinga
  - Genus Doliornis
  - Genus Gymnoderus – bare-necked fruitcrow
  - Genus Haematoderus – crimson fruitcrow
  - Genus Lipaugus
  - Genus Perissocephalus – capuchinbird
  - Genus Phibalura – swallow-tailed cotinga
  - Genus Phoenicircus
  - Genus Phytotoma – plantcutters
  - Genus Pipreola
  - Genus Porphyrolaema – purple-throated cotinga
  - Genus Procnias – Neotropical bellbird
  - Genus Pyroderus – red-ruffed fruitcrow
  - Genus Querula – purple-throated fruitcrow
  - Genus Rupicola
  - Genus Snowornis
  - Genus Tijuca
  - Genus Xipholena
  - Genus Zaratornis – white-cheeked cotinga
- Family Dasyornithidae
  - Genus Dasyornis – bristlebirds
- Family Dicaeidae – flowerpeckers
  - Genus Dicaeum
  - Genus Prionochilus
- Family Dicruridae
  - Genus Dicrurus – drongos
- Family Donacobiidae
  - Genus Donacobius – black-capped donacobius
- Family Dulidae
  - Genus Dulus- palmchat
- Family Elachuridae
  - Genus Elachura – spotted elachura
- Family Emberizidae
  - Genus Diglossopis
  - Genus Emberiza – Old World buntings
- Family Erythrocercidae
  - Genus Erythrocercus
- Family Estrildidae – waxbills, munias, and allies
  - Genus Amadina – cut-throats
  - Genus Amandava – avadavats
  - Genus Chloebia – Gouldian finch
  - Genus Clytospiza – brown twinspot
  - Genus Coccopygia
  - Genus Cryptospiza – crimsonwings
  - Genus Emblema – painted finch
  - Genus Erythrura – parrotfinches
  - Genus Estrilda – waxbills
  - Genus Euodice – silverbill
  - Genus Euschistospiza
  - Genus Heteromunia – pictorella mannikin
  - Genus Hypargos
  - Genus Lagonosticta – firefinches
  - Genus Lonchura – munias, mannikins
  - Genus Mandingoa – green-backed twinspot
  - Genus Neochmia
  - Genus Nesocharis – oliveback
  - Genus Nigrita
  - Genus Odontospiza – grey-headed silverbill
  - Genus Oreostruthus – mountain firetail
  - Genus Ortygospiza – quailfinches
  - Genus Padda
  - Genus Paludipasser – locust finch
  - Genus Parmoptila – antpeckers
  - Genus Poephila
  - Genus Pyrenestes – seedcrackers
  - Genus Pytilia
  - Genus Spermophaga – bluebill
  - Genus Stagonopleura – firetail
  - Genus Taeniopygia
  - Genus Uraeginthus
- Family Eulacestomidae
  - Genus Eulacestoma – wattled ploughbill
- Family Eupetidae
  - Genus Eupetes – Malaysian rail-babbler
- Family Eurylaimidae – broadbills
  - Genus Calyptomena
  - Genus Corydon – dusky broadbill
  - Genus Cymbirhynchus – black-and-red broadbill
  - Genus Eurylaimus
  - Genus Neodrepanis
  - Genus Philepitta
  - Genus Psarisomus – long-tailed broadbill
  - Genus Pseudocalyptomena – Grauer's broadbill
  - Genus Sarcophanops
  - Genus Serilophus – silver-breasted broadbill
  - Genus Smithornis
- Family Formicariidae – antthrushes
  - Genus Chamaeza
  - Genus Formicarius
- Family Fringillidae – true finches and Hawaiian honeycreepers
  - Genus Acanthis – redpolls
  - Genus Agraphospiza – Blanford's rosefinch
  - Genus Bucanetes – trumpeter finch and Mongolian finch
  - Genus Callacanthis – spectacled finch
  - Genus Carduelis
  - Genus Carpodacus – rosefinches
  - Genus Chloridops
  - Genus Chloris – greenfinches
  - Genus Chlorodrepanis – 'amakihis
  - Genus Chlorophonia
  - Genus Chrysocorythus – mountain serin
  - Genus Coccothraustes
  - Genus Crithagra
  - Genus Drepanis
  - Genus Eophona – Chinese grosbeak and Japanese grosbeak
  - Genus Euphonia
  - Genus Fringilla
  - Genus Haemorhous – American rosefinches
  - Genus Hemignathus
  - Genus Himatione
  - Genus Leucosticte – mountain and rosy finches
  - Genus Linaria
  - Genus Linurgus – oriole finch
  - Genus Loxia – crossbills
  - Genus Loxioides – palila
  - Genus Loxops
  - Genus Magumma – ʻanianiau
  - Genus Melamprosops – poʻouli
  - Genus Mycerobas – Palearctic grosbeaks
  - Genus Oreomystis – ʻakikiki
  - Genus Palmeria – ʻakohekohe
  - Genus Paroreomyza
  - Genus Pinicola – pine grosbeak
  - Genus Procarduelis – dark-breasted rosefinch
  - Genus Pseudonestor – Maui parrotbill
  - Genus Psittirostra – ʻōʻū
  - Genus Pyrrhoplectes – golden-naped finch
  - Genus Pyrrhula – bullfinches
  - Genus Rhodopechys
  - Genus Rhodospiza – desert finch
  - Genus Rhynchostruthus – golden-winged grosbeak
  - Genus Serinus
  - Genus Spinus
  - Genus Telespiza
- Family Furnariidae – ovenbirds and woodcreepers
  - Genus Acrobatornis – pink-legged graveteiro
  - Genus Anabacerthia – foliage-gleaners
  - Genus Anabazenops – foliage-gleaners
  - Genus Ancistrops – chestnut-winged hookbill
  - Genus Anumbius – firewood-gatherer
  - Genus Aphrastura – rayaditos
  - Genus Asthenes – canasteros
  - Genus Automolus – foliage-gleaners
  - Genus Berlepschia – point-tailed palmcreeper
  - Genus Campylorhamphus – scythebills
  - Genus Certhiasomus – spot-throated woodcreeper
  - Genus Certhiaxis – spinetails
  - Genus Cichlocolaptes
  - Genus Cinclodes
  - Genus Clibanornis
  - Genus Coryphistera – lark-like brushrunner
  - Genus Cranioleuca – typical spinetails
  - Genus Deconychura – long-tailed woodcreeper
  - Genus Dendrexetastes – cinnamon-throated woodcreeper
  - Genus Dendrocincla – woodcreepers
  - Genus Dendrocolaptes – woodcreepers
  - Genus Dendroplex – straight-billed woodcreeper
  - Genus Drymornis – scimitar-billed woodcreeper
  - Genus Drymotoxeres – greater scythebill
  - Genus Furnarius – horneros
  - Genus Geocerthia – striated earthcreeper
  - Genus Geositta – miners
  - Genus Glyphorynchus – wedge-billed woodcreeper
  - Genus Heliobletus – sharp-billed treehunter
  - Genus Hellmayrea – white-browed spinetail
  - Genus Hylexetastes – woodcreepers
  - Genus Lepidocolaptes – narrow-billed woodcreeper
  - Genus Leptasthenura – tit-spinetails
  - Genus Limnoctites – straight-billed reedhaunter
  - Genus Limnornis – curve-billed reedhaunter
  - Genus Lochmias – sharp-tailed streamcreeper
  - Genus Margarornis – treerunners
  - Genus Mazaria – white-bellied spinetail
  - Genus Megaxenops – great xenops
  - Genus Metopothrix – orange-fronted plushcrown
  - Genus Microxenops – rufous-tailed xenops
  - Genus Nasica – long-billed woodcreeper
  - Genus Ochetorhynchus – earthcreepers
  - Genus Phacellodomus – thornbird
  - Genus Philydor – foliage-gleaners
  - Genus Phleocryptes – wren-like rushbird
  - Genus Premnoplex – typical barbtails
  - Genus Premnornis – rusty-winged barbtail
  - Genus Pseudasthenes – "false" canasteros
  - Genus Pseudocolaptes – tuftedcheeks
  - Genus Pseudoseisura
  - Genus Pygarrhichas – white-throated treerunner
  - Genus Roraimia
  - Genus Schoeniophylax – Chotoy spinetail
  - Genus Sclerurus – leaftossers
  - Genus Siptornis – spectacled prickletail
  - Genus Sittasomus – olivaceous woodcreeper
  - Genus Spartonoica – bay-capped wren-spinetail
  - Genus Sylviorthorhynchus – Des Murs's wiretail
  - Genus Synallaxis – spinetails
  - Genus Syndactyla – foliage-gleaners
  - Genus Tarphonomus
  - Genus Thripadectes – treehunters
  - Genus Thripophaga – softtails
  - Genus Upucerthia – earthcreepers
  - Genus Xenerpestes – greytails
  - Genus Xenops
  - Genus Xiphocolaptes – woodcreepers
  - Genus Xiphorhynchus – woodcreepers
- Family Grallariidae – antpittas
  - Genus Grallaria
  - Genus Grallaricula
  - Genus Hylopezus
  - Genus Myrmothera
- Family Hirundinidae – swallows and martins
  - Genus Alopochelidon – tawny-headed swallow
  - Genus Atticora
  - Genus Cecropis
  - Genus Cheramoeca – white-backed swallow
  - Genus Delichon
  - Genus Haplochelidon – Andean swallow
  - Genus Hirundo
  - Genus Neochelidon – white-thighed swallow
  - Genus Notiochelidon
  - Genus Petrochelidon
  - Genus Phedina
  - Genus Progne
  - Genus Psalidoprocne – saw-wings
  - Genus Pseudhirundo – grey-rumped swallow
  - Genus Pseudochelidon – river martin
  - Genus Ptyonoprogne – crag martins
  - Genus Riparia
  - Genus Stelgidopteryx
  - Genus Tachycineta
- Family Hyliidae
- Family Hyliotidae
  - Genus Hyliota – hyliotas
- Family Hylocitreidae
  - Genus Hylocitrea – hylocitreas
- Family Hypocoliidae
  - Genus Hypocolius – grey hypocolius
- Family Icteridae – grackles, New World blackbirds, and New World orioles
  - Genus Agelaioides – baywings
  - Genus Agelaius – typical American blackbirds
  - Genus Agelasticus
  - Genus Amblycercus – yellow-billed cacique
  - Genus Amblyramphus – scarlet-headed blackbird
  - Genus Anumara – Forbes's blackbird
  - Genus Cacicus – true caciques
  - Genus Cassiculus - Mexican cacique
  - Genus Chrysomus
  - Genus Curaeus – Austral blackbird
  - Genus Dives
  - Genus Dolichonyx – bobolink
  - Genus Euphagus
  - Genus Gnorimopsar – chopi blackbird
  - Genus Gymnomystax – oriole blackbird
  - Genus Hypopyrrhus – red-bellied grackle
  - Genus Icterus – New World orioles
  - Genus Lampropsar – velvet-fronted grackle
  - Genus Leistes – South American meadowlarks
  - Genus Macroagelaius
  - Genus Molothrus – cowbirds
  - Genus Nesopsar – Jamaican blackbird
  - Genus Oreopsar – Bolivian blackbird
  - Genus Psarocolius – oropendolas
  - Genus Pseudoleistes – marshbirds
  - Genus Quiscalus – grackles
  - Genus Sturnella – North American meadowlarks
  - Genus Xanthocephalus – yellow-headed blackbird
  - Genus Xanthopsar – saffron-cowled blackbird
- Family Ifritidae
  - Genus Ifrita – blue-capped ifrit
- Family Irenidae
  - Genus Irena – fairy-bluebirds
- Family Laniidae – shrikes
  - Genus Corvinella – yellow-billed shrike
  - Genus Eurocephalus
  - Genus Lanius
  - Genus Urolestes – magpie shrike
- Family Leiothrichidae – laughingthrushes and allies
  - Genus Actinodura – barwings
  - Genus Argya – typical babblers
  - Genus Cutia
  - Genus Garrulax – laughingthrushes
  - Genus Grammatoptila – striated laughingthrush
  - Genus Heterophasia – sibia
  - Genus Ianthocincla – laughingthrushes
  - Genus Laniellus – crocias
  - Genus Leioptila – rufous-backed sibia
  - Genus Leiothrix
  - Genus Liocichla
  - Genus Minla – red-tailed minla
  - Genus Montecincla – laughingthrushes
  - Genus Pterorhinus
  - Genus Trochalopteron – laughingthrushes
  - Genus Turdoides – babblers
- Family Locustellidae – grass-warbler and allies
  - Genus Bradypterus – megalurid bush warblers
  - Genus Catriscus – fan-tailed grassbird
  - Genus Cincloramphus – buff-banded thicketbird
  - Genus Elaphrornis – Sri Lanka bush warbler
  - Genus Helopsaltes – grasshopper warbler
  - Genus Locustella – grass warblers
  - Genus Malia
  - Genus Megalurus – striated grassbird
  - Genus Poodytes
  - Genus Robsonius – ground warblers
  - Genus Schoenicola
- Family Machaerirhynchidae
  - Genus Machaerirhynchus – boatbills
- Family Macrosphenidae – African warblers such as longbills and crombecs
  - Genus Achaetops – rockrunner
  - Genus Cryptillas – Victorin's warbler
  - Genus Macrosphenus – longbills
  - Genus Melocichla – moustached grass warbler
  - Genus Sphenoeacus – Cape grassbird
  - Genus Sylvietta – crombecs
- Family Malaconotidae – puffbacks, bushshrikes, tchagras, boubous, and allies
  - Genus Chlorophoneus
  - Genus Dryoscopus
  - Genus Laniarius
  - Genus Malaconotus
  - Genus Nilaus – brubru
  - Genus Rhodophoneus – rosy-patched bushshrike
  - Genus Tchagra
  - Genus Telophorus
- Family Maluridae – fairywrens, emu-wren, and grasswrens
  - Genus Amytornis – grasswrens
  - Genus Chenorhamphus
  - Genus Clytomyias – orange-crowned fairywren
  - Genus Malurus
  - Genus Sipodotus – Wallace's fairywren
  - Genus Stipiturus – emu-wren
- Family Melampittidae
  - Genus Megalampitta – greater melampitta
  - Genus Melampitta
- Family Melanocharitidae – berrypeckers and longbills
  - Genus Melanocharis
  - Genus Oedistoma
  - Genus Rhamphocharis – spotted berrypecker
  - Genus Toxorhamphus
- Family Melanopareiidae
  - Genus Melanopareia – crescentchests
- Family Meliphagidae – honeyeaters
  - Genus Acanthagenys – spiny-cheeked honeyeater
  - Genus Acanthorhynchus – spinebill
  - Genus Anthochaera
  - Genus Anthornis – New Zealand bellbird
  - Genus Ashbyia – gibberbird
  - Genus Bolemoreus
  - Genus Caligavis
  - Genus Certhionyx – pied honeyeater
  - Genus Cissomela – banded honeyeater
  - Genus Conopophila
  - Genus Entomyzon – blue-faced honeyeater
  - Genus Epthianura
  - Genus Foulehaio – wattled honeyeater
  - Genus Gavicalis
  - Genus Gliciphila – tawny-crowned honeyeater
  - Genus Glycichaera – green-backed honeyeater
  - Genus Glycifohia
  - Genus Grantiella
  - Genus Guadalcanaria – Guadalcanal honeyeater
  - Genus Gymnomyza
  - Genus Lichenostomus
  - Genus Lichmera
  - Genus Macgregoria – MacGregor's honeyeater
  - Genus Manorina
  - Genus Meliarchus – makira honeyeater
  - Genus Melidectes
  - Genus Melilestes – long-billed honeyeater
  - Genus Meliphaga
  - Genus Melipotes
  - Genus Melithreptus
  - Genus Melitograis – white-streaked friarbird
  - Genus Myza
  - Genus Myzomela
  - Genus Nesoptilotis
  - Genus Oreornis – orange-cheeked honeyeater
  - Genus Philemon – friarbird
  - Genus Phylidonyris
  - Genus Plectorhyncha – striped honeyeater
  - Genus Prosthemadera – tūī
  - Genus Ptiloprora
  - Genus Ptilotula
  - Genus Purnella – white-fronted honeyeater
  - Genus Pycnopygius
  - Genus Ramsayornis
  - Genus Stomiopera
  - Genus Stresemannia – Bougainville honeyeater
  - Genus Sugomel – black honeyeater
  - Genus Timeliopsis
  - Genus Trichodere – white-streaked honeyeater
  - Genus Xanthotis
- Family Menuridae
  - Genus Menura – lyrebirds
- Family Mimidae – mockingbirds and thrashers
  - Genus Allenia – scaly-breasted thrasher
  - Genus Cinclocerthia – tremblers
  - Genus Dumetella – grey catbird
  - Genus Margarops – pearly-eyed thrasher
  - Genus Melanoptila – black catbird
  - Genus Melanotis
  - Genus Mimus
  - Genus Oreoscoptes – sage thrasher
  - Genus Ramphocinclus – white-breasted thrasher
  - Genus Toxostoma
- Family Mitrospingidae
  - Genus Lamprospiza – red-billed pied tanager
  - Genus Mitrospingus
  - Genus Orthogonys – olive-green tanager
- Family Modulatricidae – dapple-throat and allies
  - Genus Arcanator – dapple-throat
  - Genus Kakamega
  - Genus Modulatrix – spot-throat
- Family Mohouidae
  - Genus Mohoua
- Family Monarchidae – monarch flycatchers
  - Genus Arses
  - Genus Carterornis
  - Genus Chasiempis – ‘elepaio
  - Genus Clytorhynchus – shrikebill
  - Genus Eutrichomyias – cerulean paradise flycatcher
  - Genus Grallina – magpie-larks
  - Genus Hypothymis
  - Genus Mayrornis
  - Genus Metabolus – Chuuk monarch
  - Genus Monarcha
  - Genus Myiagra – broad-billed flycatcher
  - Genus Neolalage – buff-bellied monarch
  - Genus Pomarea
  - Genus Symposiachrus
  - Genus Terpsiphone – paradise flycatcher
  - Genus Trochocercus
- Family Motacillidae
  - Genus Anthus – pipits
  - Genus Dendronanthus – forest wagtail
  - Genus Hemimacronyx (proposed)
  - Genus Macronyx – longclaws
  - Genus Motacilla – wagtails
  - Genus Tmetothylacus – golden pipit
- Family Muscicapidae – Old World flycatchers and chats
  - Genus Alethe
  - Genus Anthipes
  - Genus Brachypteryx – shortwings
  - Genus Calliope
  - Genus Campicoloides – buff-streaked chat
  - Genus Cercotrichas – scrub robins
  - Genus Chamaetylas
  - Genus Cichladusa – palm thrush
  - Genus Cinclidium – blue-fronted robin
  - Genus Copsychus – magpie-robins and shamas
  - Genus Cossypha – robin-chats
  - Genus Cossyphicula – white-bellied robin-chat
  - Genus Cyanoptila
  - Genus Cyornis
  - Genus Emarginata
  - Genus Empidornis – silverbirds
  - Genus Enicurus – forktails
  - Genus Erithacus – European robin
  - Genus Eumyias
  - Genus Ficedula – flycatchers
  - Genus Fraseria – forest flycatchers
  - Genus Heinrichia – great shortwing
  - Genus Heteroxenicus – Gould's shortwing
  - Genus Humblotia – Humblot's flycatcher
  - Genus Irania – white-throated robin
  - Genus Larvivora
  - Genus Leonardina – Bagobo babbler
  - Genus Luscinia
  - Genus Melaenornis
  - Genus Monticola – rock thrushes
  - Genus Muscicapa
  - Genus Muscicapella – pygmy flycatcher
  - Genus Myiomela
  - Genus Myioparus – tit-flycatchers
  - Genus Myophonus – whistling thrush
  - Genus Myrmecocichla
  - Genus Namibornis – Herero chat
  - Genus Niltava
  - Genus Oenanthe – wheatears
  - Genus Phoenicurus – redstarts
  - Genus Pinarochroa – moorland chat
  - Genus Pinarornis – boulder chat
  - Genus Pogonocichla – white-starred robin
  - Genus Saxicola
  - Genus Sheppardia – akalats
  - Genus Sholicola
  - Genus Stiphrornis – forest robins
  - Genus Swynnertonia – Swynnerton's robin
  - Genus Tarsiger
  - Genus Thamnolaea – cliff chats
  - Genus Vauriella
- Family Nectariniidae – sunbirds and spiderhunters
  - Genus Aethopyga
  - Genus Anabathmis
  - Genus Anthobaphes – orange-breasted sunbird
  - Genus Anthreptes
  - Genus Arachnothera – spiderhunters
  - Genus Chalcomitra
  - Genus Chalcoparia – ruby-cheeked sunbird
  - Genus Cinnyris
  - Genus Cyanomitra
  - Genus Deleornis
  - Genus Drepanorhynchus – golden-winged sunbird
  - Genus Dreptes – giant sunbird
  - Genus Hedydipna
  - Genus Hypogramma – purple-naped sunbird
  - Genus Leptocoma
  - Genus Nectarinia
- Family Neosittidae
  - Genus Daphoenositta – sittellas
- Family Nesospingidae
  - Genus Nesospingus – Puerto Rican tanager
- Family Nicatoridae
  - Genus Nicator- nicators
- Family Notiomystidae
  - Genus Notiomystis – stitchbirds
- Family Oreoicidae – Australo-Papuan bellbirds
  - Genus Aleadryas – rufous-naped bellbird
  - Genus Oreoica – crested bellbird
  - Genus Ornorectes – piping bellbird
- Family Oriolidae – Old World orioles
  - Genus Oriolus – orioles
  - Genus Pitohui
  - Genus Sphecotheres – figbirds
- Family Orthonychidae
  - Genus Orthonyx – logrunners
- Family Pachycephalidae
  - Genus Colluricincla – shrikethrushes
  - Genus Coracornis
  - Genus Falcunculus – crested shriketit
  - Genus Melanorectes – black pitohui
  - Genus Pachycephala – whistlers
  - Genus Pseudorectes
- Family Panuridae
  - Genus Panurus – bearded reedling
- Family Paradisaeidae – birds-of-paradise
  - Genus Astrapia
  - Genus Cicinnurus – king bird-of-paradise
  - Genus Diphyllodes
  - Genus Drepanornis
  - Genus Epimachus
  - Genus Lophorina
  - Genus Lycocorax – paradise-crow
  - Genus Manucodia – manucodes
  - Genus Paradigalla
  - Genus Paradisaea
  - Genus Parotia
  - Genus Phonygammus – trumpet manucode
  - Genus Pteridophora – King of Saxony bird-of-paradise
  - Genus Ptiloris
  - Genus Seleucidis – twelve-wired bird-of-paradise
  - Genus Semioptera – standardwings
- Family Paradoxornithidae – parrotbills and allies
  - Genus Chamaea – wrentit
  - Genus Chrysomma (formerly in Timaliidae)
  - Genus Fulvetta (formerly in Alcippe )
  - Genus Lioparus – golden-breasted fulvetta (formerly in Alcippe)
  - Genus Moupinia – rufous-tailed babbler (formerly in Chrysomma)
  - Genus Myzornis – fire-tailed myzornis
  - Genus Paradoxornis
  - Genus Rhopophilus (formerly in Cisticolidae)
  - Genus Suthora
- Family Paramythiidae – painted berrypeckers
  - Genus Oreocharis – tit berrypecker
  - Genus Paramythia – crested berrypecker
- Family Pardalotidae
  - Genus Pardalotus – pardalotes
- Family Paridae – tits, chickadees, and titmice
  - Genus Baeolophus – titmice
  - Genus Cephalopyrus – fire-capped tit
  - Genus Cyanistes – blue tits
  - Genus Lophophanes – crested tits
  - Genus Machlolophus
  - Genus Melaniparus
  - Genus Melanochlora – sultan tit
  - Genus Pardaliparus
  - Genus Parus – typical tits
  - Genus Periparus
  - Genus Poecile
  - Genus Pseudopodoces – ground tit
  - Genus Sittiparus
  - Genus Sylviparus – yellow-browed tit
- Family Parulidae – New World warblers
  - Genus Basileuterus
  - Genus Cardellina
  - Genus Catharopeza – whistling warbler
  - Genus Ergaticus
  - Genus Geothlypis – yellowthroats
  - Genus Helmitheros – worm-eating warbler
  - Genus Leucopeza – Semper's warbler
  - Genus Limnothlypis – Swainson's warbler
  - Genus Mniotilta – black-and-white warbler
  - Genus Myioborus – whitestarts
  - Genus Myiothlypis
  - Genus Oporornis – Connecticut warbler
  - Genus Oreothlypis
  - Genus Parkesia – waterthrushes
  - Genus Parula
  - Genus Protonotaria – prothonotary warbler
  - Genus Seiurus – ovenbird
  - Genus Setophaga
  - Genus Vermivora
- Family Passerellidae – New World sparrows
  - Genus Aimophila
  - Genus Ammodramus
  - Genus Amphispiza
  - Genus Arremon
  - Genus Arremonops
  - Genus Artemisiospiza
  - Genus Atlapetes
  - Genus Calamospiza – lark bunting
  - Genus Chlorospingus
  - Genus Chondestes – lark sparrow
  - Genus Junco
  - Genus Melospiza
  - Genus Melozone
  - Genus Oreothraupis – tanager finch
  - Genus Oriturus – striped sparrow
  - Genus Passerculus
  - Genus Passerella – fox sparrow
  - Genus Peucaea
  - Genus Pezopetes – large-footed finch
  - Genus Pipilo – towhee
  - Genus Pooecetes – vesper sparrow
  - Genus Pselliophorus
  - Genus Spizella
  - Genus Spizelloides – American tree sparrow
  - Genus Torreornis – Zapata sparrow
  - Genus Xenospiza – Sierra Madre sparrow
  - Genus Zonotrichia
- Family Passeridae – Old World sparrows
  - Genus Carpospiza – pale rockfinch
  - Genus Gymnoris
  - Genus Hypocryptadius – cinnamon ibon
  - Genus Montifringilla
  - Genus Onychostruthus – white-rumped snowfinch
  - Genus Passer – true sparrows
  - Genus Petronia – rock sparrows
  - Genus Pyrgilauda
- Family Pellorneidae – jungle babblers
  - Genus Alcippe
  - Genus Gampsorhynchus
  - Genus Graminicola
  - Genus Gypsophila
  - Genus Illadopsis
  - Genus Jabouilleia
  - Genus Kenopia – striped wren-babbler
  - Genus Laticilla
  - Genus Malacocincla
  - Genus Malacopteron
  - Genus Napothera
  - Genus Pellorneum
  - Genus Ptilocichla
  - Genus Ptyrticus – spotted thrush-babbler
  - Genus Rimator
  - Genus Trichastoma
- Family Petroicidae – Australasian robins
  - Genus Amalocichla
  - Genus Drymodes
  - Genus Eopsaltria
  - Genus Eugerygone – garnet robin
  - Genus Heteromyias
  - Genus Melanodryas
  - Genus Microeca
  - Genus Monachella – torrent flyrobin
  - Genus Pachycephalopsis
  - Genus Peneoenanthe – mangrove robin
  - Genus Peneothello
  - Genus Petroica
  - Genus Poecilodryas
  - Genus Tregellasia
- Family Peucedramidae
  - Genus Peucedramus – olive warbler
- Family Phaenicophilidae
  - Genus Microligea – green-tailed warbler
  - Genus Phaenicophilus
  - Genus Xenoligea – white-winged warbler
- Family Philepittidae – asities
  - Genus Neodrepanis
  - Genus Philepitta
- Family Phylloscopidae – leaf warblers
  - Genus Phylloscopus – leaf warblers
- Family Picathartidae
  - Genus Picathartes – rockfowl
- Family Pipridae – manakins
  - Genus Antilophia
  - Genus Ceratopipra
  - Genus Chiroxiphia
  - Genus Chloropipo
  - Genus Corapipo
  - Genus Cryptopipo – green manakin
  - Genus Heterocercus
  - Genus Ilicura – pin-tailed manakin
  - Genus Lepidothrix
  - Genus Machaeropterus
  - Genus Manacus
  - Genus Masius – golden-winged manakin
  - Genus Neopelma
  - Genus Pipra
  - Genus Pseudopipra – white-crowned manakin
  - Genus Tyranneutes
  - Genus Xenopipo
- Family Pittidae – pittas
  - Genus Erythropitta
  - Genus Hydrornis
  - Genus Pitta
- Family Pityriaseidae
  - Genus Pityriasis – Bornean bristlehead
- Family Platysteiridae – wattle-eyes and relatives
  - Genus Batis
  - Genus Lanioturdus – white-tailed shrike
  - Genus Platysteira
  - Genus Dyaphorophyia
- Family Ploceidae – weavers
  - Genus Amblyospiza – thick-billed weaver
  - Genus Anaplectes – red-headed weaver
  - Genus Brachycope – bob-tailed weaver
  - Genus Bubalornis
  - Genus Dinemellia – white-headed buffalo weaver
  - Genus Euplectes – bishops and widowbirds
  - Genus Foudia – fody
  - Genus Histurgops – rufous-tailed weaver
  - Genus Malimbus
  - Genus Philetairus – sociable weaver
  - Genus Plocepasser – sparrow-weavers
  - Genus Ploceus
  - Genus Pseudonigrita
  - Genus Quelea
  - Genus Sporopipes
- Family Pnoepygidae
  - Genus Pnoepyga – pygmy wren-babbler
- Family Polioptilidae – gnatcatchers
  - Genus Microbates
  - Genus Ramphocaenus
  - Genus Polioptila
- Family Pomatostomidae – Australo-Papuan babblers
  - Genus Pomatostomus
- Family Prionopidae – see Vangidae
- Family Promeropidae
  - Genus Promerops – sugarbirds
- Family Prunellidae
  - Genus Prunella – accentors
- Family Psophodidae
  - Genus Androphobus – Papuan whipbird
  - Genus Cinclosoma – quail-thrushes
  - Genus Psophodes
  - Genus Ptilorrhoa – jewel-babblers
- Family Ptiliogonatidae – silky flycatchers
  - Genus Phainopepla
  - Genus Phainoptila – black-and-yellow phainoptila
  - Genus Ptilogonys
- Family Ptilonorhynchidae – bowerbirds
  - Genus Ailuroedus
  - Genus Amblyornis
  - Genus Archboldia
  - Genus Chlamydera
  - Genus Prionodura – golden bowerbird
  - Genus Ptilonorhynchus – satin bowerbird
  - Genus Scenopooetes – tooth-billed bowerbird
  - Genus Sericulus
- Family Pycnonotidae – bulbuls
  - Genus Acritillas – yellow-browed bulbul
  - Genus Alophoixus
  - Genus Andropadus – sombre greenbul
  - Genus Arizelocichla
  - Genus Atimastillas – yellow-throated leaflove
  - Genus Baeopogon
  - Genus Bleda – bristlebills
  - Genus Calyptocichla – golden greenbul
  - Genus Cerasophila – white-headed bulbul
  - Genus Chlorocichla
  - Genus Criniger
  - Genus Eurillas
  - Genus Hemixos
  - Genus Hypsipetes
  - Genus Iole
  - Genus Ixonotus – spotted greenbul
  - Genus Ixos
  - Genus Neolestes – black-collared bulbul
  - Genus Nok – bare-faced bulbul
  - Genus Phyllastrephus
  - Genus Pycnonotus
  - Genus Setornis – hook-billed bulbul
  - Genus Spizixos – finchbills
  - Genus Stelgidillas – slender-billed greenbul
  - Genus Thapsinillas – golden bulbul
  - Genus Thescelocichla – swamp palm bulbul
  - Genus Tricholestes – hairy-backed bulbul
- Family Regulidae
  - Genus Regulus – crests and kinglets
- Family Remizidae – penduline tits
  - Genus Anthoscopus
  - Genus Auriparus – verdin
  - Genus Remiz
- Family Rhagologidae
  - Genus Rhagologus – mottled berryhunter
- Family Rhinocryptidae – tapaculos
  - Genus Acropternis – ocellated tapaculo
  - Genus Eleoscytalopus
  - Genus Eugralla – ochre-flanked tapaculo
  - Genus Liosceles – rusty-belted tapaculo
  - Genus Merulaxis
  - Genus Myornis – ash-colored tapaculo
  - Genus Psilorhamphus – spotted bamboowren
  - Genus Pteroptochos
  - Genus Rhinocrypta – crested gallito
  - Genus Scelorchilus
  - Genus Scytalopus
  - Genus Teledromas – sandy gallito
- Family Rhipiduridae – fantails
  - Genus Chaetorhynchus – drongo fantail
  - Genus Lamprolia – silktail
  - Genus Rhipidura – fantails
- Family Rhodinocichlidae
  - Genus Rhodinocichla – rosy thrush-tanager
- Family Salpornithidae – spotted creepers
  - Genus Salpornis
- Family Sapayoidae
  - Genus Sapayoa – broad-billed sapayoa
- Family Scotocercidae
  - Genus Scotocerca – streaked scrub warbler
- Family Sittidae
  - Genus Sitta – nuthatches
- Family Spindalidae
  - Genus Spindalis
- Family Stenostiridae
  - Genus Chelidorhynx – yellow-bellied fantail
  - Genus Culicicapa – canary-flycatcher
  - Genus Elminia
  - Genus Stenostira – fairy flycatcher
- Family Sturnidae – starlings
  - Genus Acridotheres
  - Genus Agropsar
  - Genus Ampeliceps — golden-crested myna
  - Genus Aplonis— Pacific starlings
  - Genus Basilornis
  - Genus Cinnyricinclus — violet-backed starling
  - Genus Creatophora — wattled starling
  - Genus Enodes — fiery-browed starling
  - Genus Gracula — hill myna
  - Genus Gracupica
  - Genus Grafisia — white-collared starling
  - Genus Hartlaubius – Madagascan starling
  - Genus Hylopsar
  - Genus Lamprotornis
  - Genus Leucopsar — Bali myna
  - Genus Mino
  - Genus Neocichla — babbling starling
  - Genus Notopholia – black-bellied starling
  - Genus Onychognathus
  - Genus Poeoptera
  - Genus Rhabdornis — Philippine creeper
  - Genus Pastor — rosy starling
  - Genus Sarcops — coleto
  - Genus Saroglossa – spot-winged starling
  - Genus Scissirostrum — grosbeak starling
  - Genus Speculipastor — magpie starling
  - Genus Spodiopsar
  - Genus Spreo
  - Genus Streptocitta
  - Genus Sturnia
  - Genus Sturnornis — white-faced starling
  - Genus Sturnus — typical starlings
- Family Sylviidae – sylviid warblers and allies
  - Genus Chleuasicus (needs update, no longer in Sylviidae)
  - Genus Cholornis (needs update, no longer in Sylviidae)
  - Genus Graueria (needs update, no longer in Sylviidae)
  - Genus Horizorhinus (needs update, no longer in Sylviidae)
  - Genus Lioptilus (needs update, no longer in Sylviidae)
  - Genus Parophasma (needs update, no longer in Sylviidae)
  - Genus Pseudoalcippe (needs update, no longer in Sylviidae)
  - Genus Psittiparus (needs update, no longer in Sylviidae)
  - Genus Curruca
  - Genus Sylvia – typical warblers
- Family Teretistridae
  - Genus Teretistris – Cuban warbler
- Family Thamnophilidae – antbirds
  - Genus Akletos
  - Genus Ammonastes – grey-bellied antbird
  - Genus Ampelornis – grey-headed antbird
  - Genus Aprositornis – Yapacana antbird
  - Genus Batara – giant antshrike
  - Genus Biatas – white-bearded antshrike
  - Genus Cercomacra
  - Genus Cercomacroides
  - Genus Clytoctantes – bushbirds
  - Genus Cymbilaimus – fasciated and bamboo antshrikes
  - Genus Dichrozona – banded antbird
  - Genus Drymophila
  - Genus Dysithamnus – antvireos
  - Genus Epinecrophylla
  - Genus Euchrepomis
  - Genus Formicivora
  - Genus Frederickena – antshrikes
  - Genus Gymnocichla – bare-crowned antbird
  - Genus Gymnopithys
  - Genus Hafferia
  - Genus Herpsilochmus
  - Genus Hylophylax
  - Genus Hypocnemis – warbling antbirds
  - Genus Hypocnemoides
  - Genus Hypoedaleus – spot-backed antshrike
  - Genus Isleria – antwrens
  - Genus Mackenziaena – antshrikes
  - Genus Megastictus – pearly antshrike
  - Genus Microrhopias – dot-winged antwren
  - Genus Myrmeciza – white-bellied antbird
  - Genus Myrmelastes
  - Genus Myrmoborus
  - Genus Myrmochanes – black-and-white antbird
  - Genus Myrmoderus
  - Genus Myrmophylax – black-throated antbird
  - Genus Myrmorchilus – stripe-backed antbird
  - Genus Myrmornis – wing-banded antbird
  - Genus Myrmotherula – antwrens
  - Genus Neoctantes – black bushbird
  - Genus Oneillornis
  - Genus Percnostola
  - Genus Phaenostictus – ocellated antbird
  - Genus Phlegopsis – bare-eyes
  - Genus Pithys
  - Genus Poliocrania – chestnut-backed antbird
  - Genus Pygiptila – spot-winged antshrike
  - Genus Pyriglena – fire-eyes
  - Genus Rhegmatorhina
  - Genus Rhopias – star-throated antwren
  - Genus Rhopornis – slender antbird
  - Genus Sakesphorus – antshrikes
  - Genus Sciaphylax
  - Genus Sclateria – silvered antbird
  - Genus Sipia
  - Genus Stymphalornis – marsh antwren
  - Genus Taraba – great antshrike
  - Genus Terenura
  - Genus Thamnistes
  - Genus Thamnomanes
  - Genus Thamnophilus
  - Genus Willisornis
  - Genus Xenornis – speckled antshrike
- Family Thraupidae – tanagers and allies
  - Genus Acanthidops – peg-billed finch
  - Genus Anisognathus
  - Genus Bangsia
  - Genus Buthraupis
  - Genus Calochaetes – vermilion tanager
  - Genus Camarhynchus – tree finches
  - Genus Catamblyrhynchus – plushcap
  - Genus Catamenia
  - Genus Certhidea – warbler-finches
  - Genus Charitospiza – coal-crested finch
  - Genus Chlorochrysa
  - Genus Chlorophanes – green honeycreeper
  - Genus Chlorornis – grass-green tanager
  - Genus Chrysothlypis
  - Genus Cissopis – magpie tanager
  - Genus Cnemathraupis
  - Genus Cnemoscopus – grey-hooded bush tanager
  - Genus Coereba – bananaquit
  - Genus Compsospiza – mountain finches
  - Genus Compsothraupis – scarlet-throated tanager
  - Genus Conirostrum
  - Genus Conothraupis
  - Genus Coryphaspiza – black-masked finch
  - Genus Coryphospingus
  - Genus Creurgops
  - Genus Cyanerpes – honeycreepers
  - Genus Cyanicterus – blue-backed tanager
  - Genus Cypsnagra – white-rumped tanager
  - Genus Dacnis
  - Genus Diglossa – flowerpiercers
  - Genus Diuca
  - Genus Dolospingus – white-naped seedeater
  - Genus Donacospiza – long-tailed reed finch
  - Genus Dubusia
  - Genus Emberizoides
  - Genus Embernagra
  - Genus Eucometis – grey-headed tanager
  - Genus Euneornis – orangequit
  - Genus Geospiza – ground finches
  - Genus Gubernatrix – yellow cardinal
  - Genus Haplospiza
  - Genus Hemispingus
  - Genus Hemithraupis
  - Genus Heterospingus
  - Genus Idiopsar – short-tailed finch
  - Genus Incaspiza – Inca finches
  - Genus Iridophanes – golden-collared honeycreeper
  - Genus Iridosornis
  - Genus Lanio
  - Genus Lophospingus
  - Genus Loxigilla (polyphyletic)
  - Genus Loxipasser – yellow-shouldered grassquit
  - Genus Melanodera
  - Genus Melanospiza – Saint Lucia black finch
  - Genus Melopyrrha
  - Genus Nemosia
  - Genus Neothraupis – shrike-like tanager
  - Genus Nephelornis – pardusco
  - Genus Nesospiza
  - Genus Orchesticus – brown tanager
  - Genus Oreomanes – giant conebill
  - Genus Oryzoborus
  - Genus Parkerthraustes – yellow-shouldered grosbeak
  - Genus Paroaria
  - Genus Phrygilus – sierra finches
  - Genus Piezorina – cinereous finch
  - Genus Pinaroloxias – Cocos finch
  - Genus Pipraeidea – fawn-breasted tanager
  - Genus Platyspiza – vegetarian finch
  - Genus Poospiza – warbling finches
  - Genus Porphyrospiza – blue finch
  - Genus Pseudosaltator – rufous-bellied mountain tanager
  - Genus Pyrrhocoma – chestnut-headed tanager
  - Genus Ramphocelus
  - Genus Rhodospingus – crimson-breasted finch
  - Genus Rowettia – Gough finch
  - Genus Saltator
  - Genus Saltatricula – many-colored Chaco finch
  - Genus Schistochlamys
  - Genus Sericossypha – white-capped tanager
  - Genus Sicalis – yellow finches
  - Genus Sporophila – seedeaters
  - Genus Stephanophorus – diademed tanager
  - Genus Tachyphonus
  - Genus Tangara
  - Genus Tersina – swallow tanager
  - Genus Thlypopsis
  - Genus Thraupis
  - Genus Tiaris – grassquits
  - Genus Trichothraupis – black-goggled tanager
  - Genus Urothraupis – black-backed bush tanager
  - Genus Volatinia – blue-black grassquit
  - Genus Wetmorethraupis – orange-throated tanager
  - Genus Xenodacnis – tit-like dacnis
  - Genus Xenospingus – slender-billed finch
- Family Tichodromadidae
  - Genus Tichodroma – wallcreeper
- Family Timaliidae – Old World babblers
  - Genus Dumetia – tawny-bellied babbler
  - Genus Macronus – tit-babblers
  - Genus Pomatorhinus – scimitar babblers
  - Genus Rhopocichla – dark-fronted babbler
  - Genus Spelaeornis – wren-babblers
  - Genus Sphenocichla – wedge-billed babblers
  - Genus Stachyridopsis
  - Genus Stachyris
  - Genus Timalia – chestnut-capped babbler
- Family Tityridae – tityras and allies
  - Genus Iodopleura – purpletuft
  - Genus Laniisoma
  - Genus Laniocera
  - Genus Myiobius
  - Genus Onychorhynchus – royal flycatchers
  - Genus Oxyruncus – sharpbill
  - Genus Pachyramphus – becards
  - Genus Schiffornis
  - Genus Terenotriccus – ruddy-tailed flycatcher
  - Genus Tityra
  - Genus Xenopsaris – white-naped xenopsaris
- Family Troglodytidae – wrens
  - Genus Campylorhynchus
  - Genus Cantorchilus
  - Genus Catherpes – canyon wren
  - Genus Cinnycerthia
  - Genus Cistothorus
  - Genus Cyphorhinus
  - Genus Ferminia – Zapata wren
  - Genus Henicorhina – wood wrens
  - Genus Hylorchilus
  - Genus Microcerculus
  - Genus Odontorchilus
  - Genus Pheugopedius
  - Genus Salpinctes – rock wren
  - Genus Thryomanes – Bewick's wren
  - Genus Thryophilus
  - Genus Thryorchilus – timberline wren
  - Genus Thryothorus – Carolina wren
  - Genus Troglodytes
  - Genus Uropsila – white-bellied wren
- Family Turdidae – thrushes and allies
  - Genus Cataponera – Sulawesi thrush
  - Genus Catharus
  - Genus Chlamydochaera – fruithunter
  - Genus Cichlopsis – rufous-brown solitaire
  - Genus Cochoa
  - Genus Entomodestes – solitaires
  - Genus Geokichla
  - Genus Grandala
  - Genus Hylocichla – wood thrush
  - Genus Ixoreus – varied thrush
  - Genus Myadestes
  - Genus Neocossyphus – ant thrushes
  - Genus Platycichla
  - Genus Psophocichla – groundscraper thrush
  - Genus Ridgwayia – Aztec thrush
  - Genus Sialia – bluebirds
  - Genus Stizorhina – rufous thrush
  - Genus Turdus – true thrushes
  - Genus Zoothera – Asian thrush
- Family Tyrannidae – tyrant flycatchers
  - Genus Agriornis – shrike-tyrants
  - Genus Alectrurus
  - Genus Anairetes
  - Genus Aphanotriccus
  - Genus Arundinicola – white-headed marsh tyrant
  - Genus Atalotriccus – pale-eyed pygmy tyrant
  - Genus Attila
  - Genus Calyptura – kinglet calyptura
  - Genus Camptostoma
  - Genus Capsiempis – yellow tyrannulet
  - Genus Casiornis
  - Genus Cnemarchus – red-rumped bush tyrant
  - Genus Cnemotriccus – fuscous flycatcher
  - Genus Cnipodectes – twistwings
  - Genus Colonia – long-tailed tyrant
  - Genus Colorhamphus – Patagonian tyrant
  - Genus Conopias
  - Genus Contopus – pewees
  - Genus Corythopis – antpipits
  - Genus Culicivora – sharp-tailed grass tyrant
  - Genus Deltarhynchus – flammulated flycatcher
  - Genus Elaenia
  - Genus Empidonax
  - Genus Empidonomus – variegated flycatcher
  - Genus Euscarthmus
  - Genus Fluvicola
  - Genus Griseotyrannus – crowned slaty flycatcher
  - Genus Gubernetes – streamer-tailed tyrant
  - Genus Hemitriccus – typical tody-tyrants
  - Genus Heteroxolmis – black-and-white monjita
  - Genus Hirundinea – cliff flycatcher
  - Genus Hymenops – spectacled tyrant
  - Genus Inezia
  - Genus Knipolegus – black tyrants
  - Genus Lathrotriccus
  - Genus Legatus – piratic flycatcher
  - Genus Leptopogon
  - Genus Lessonia – negritos
  - Genus Lophotriccus
  - Genus Machetornis – cattle tyrant
  - Genus Mecocerculus
  - Genus Megarynchus – boat-billed flycatcher
  - Genus Mionectes
  - Genus Mitrephanes
  - Genus Muscigralla – short-tailed field tyrant
  - Genus Muscipipra – shear-tailed grey tyrant
  - Genus Muscisaxicola – ground tyrants
  - Genus Myiarchus
  - Genus Myiodynastes
  - Genus Myiopagis
  - Genus Myiophobus
  - Genus Myiornis
  - Genus Myiotheretes
  - Genus Myiotriccus – ornate flycatcher
  - Genus Myiozetetes
  - Genus Neopipo – cinnamon neopipo
  - Genus Neoxolmis – chocolate-vented tyrant
  - Genus Nephelomyias
  - Genus Nesotriccus – Cocos flycatcher
  - Genus Ochthoeca
  - Genus Ochthornis – drab water tyrant
  - Genus Oncostoma – bentbills
  - Genus Ornithion
  - Genus Phaeomyias – mouse-colored tyrannulet
  - Genus Phelpsia – white-bearded flycatcher
  - Genus Philohydor – lesser kiskadee
  - Genus Phyllomyias
  - Genus Phylloscartes
  - Genus Piprites
  - Genus Pitangus – great kiskadee
  - Genus Platyrinchus – spadebills
  - Genus Poecilotriccus
  - Genus Pogonotriccus
  - Genus Polioxolmis – rufous-webbed bush tyrant
  - Genus Polystictus
  - Genus Pseudelaenia – grey-and-white tyrannulet
  - Genus Pseudocolopteryx
  - Genus Pseudotriccus
  - Genus Pyrocephalus
  - Genus Pyrrhomyias – cinnamon flycatcher
  - Genus Ramphotrigon
  - Genus Rhynchocyclus
  - Genus Rhytipterna
  - Genus Satrapa – yellow-browed tyrant
  - Genus Sayornis – phoebes
  - Genus Serpophaga
  - Genus Silvicultrix
  - Genus Sirystes
  - Genus Stigmatura – wagtail-tyrants
  - Genus Sublegatus
  - Genus Suiriri
  - Genus Tachuris – many-colored rush tyrant
  - Genus Taeniotriccus – black-chested tyrant
  - Genus Todirostrum – typical tody-flycatchers
  - Genus Tolmomyias
  - Genus Tumbezia – Tumbes tyrant
  - Genus Tyrannopsis – sulphury flycatcher
  - Genus Tyrannulus – yellow-crowned tyrannulet
  - Genus Tyrannus – kingbirds
  - Genus Uromyias
  - Genus Xenotriccus
  - Genus Xolmis
  - Genus Zimmerius
- Family Urocynchramidae
  - Genus Urocynchramus – Przewalski's finch
- Family Vangidae – vangas, helmetshrikes, and allies
  - Genus Artamella – white-headed vanga
  - Genus Bias – black-and-white shrike-flycatcher
  - Genus Calicalicus
  - Genus Cyanolanius – blue vanga
  - Genus Euryceros – helmet vanga
  - Genus Falculea – sickle-billed vanga
  - Genus Hemipus – flycatcher-shrikes
  - Genus Hypositta – nuthatch vanga
  - Genus Leptopterus – chabert vanga
  - Genus Megabyas – African shrike-flycatcher
  - Genus Mystacornis – Crossley's vanga
  - Genus Newtonia
  - Genus Oriolia – Bernier's vanga
  - Genus Philentoma
  - Genus Prionops – helmetshrikes
  - Genus Pseudobias – Ward's flycatcher
  - Genus Schetba – rufous vanga
  - Genus Tephrodornis
  - Genus Tylas – tylas vanga
  - Genus Vanga – hook-billed vanga
  - Genus Xenopirostris
- Family Viduidae
  - Genus Anomalospiza – cuckoo-finch
  - Genus Vidua
- Family Vireonidae – vireos and allies
  - Genus Cyclarhis – peppershrikes
  - Genus Erpornis – white-bellied erpornis
  - Genus Hylophilus
  - Genus Pteruthius – shrike-babblers
  - Genus Vireo – vireos
  - Genus Vireolanius
- Family Zeledoniidae
  - Genus Zeledonia
- Family Zosteropidae – white-eyes
  - Genus Apalopteron – Bonin white-eye
  - Genus Cleptornis – golden white-eye
  - Genus Dasycrotapha
  - Genus Heleia
  - Genus Lophozosterops
  - Genus Megazosterops – giant white-eye
  - Genus Oculocincta – pygmy white-eye
  - Genus Parayuhina – white-collared yuhina
  - Genus Rukia
  - Genus Staphida
  - Genus Sterrhoptilus
  - Genus Tephrozosterops – rufescent darkeye
  - Genus Woodfordia
  - Genus Yuhina
  - Genus Zosterops – typical white-eyes
  - Genus Zosterornis

== Pelecaniformes ==
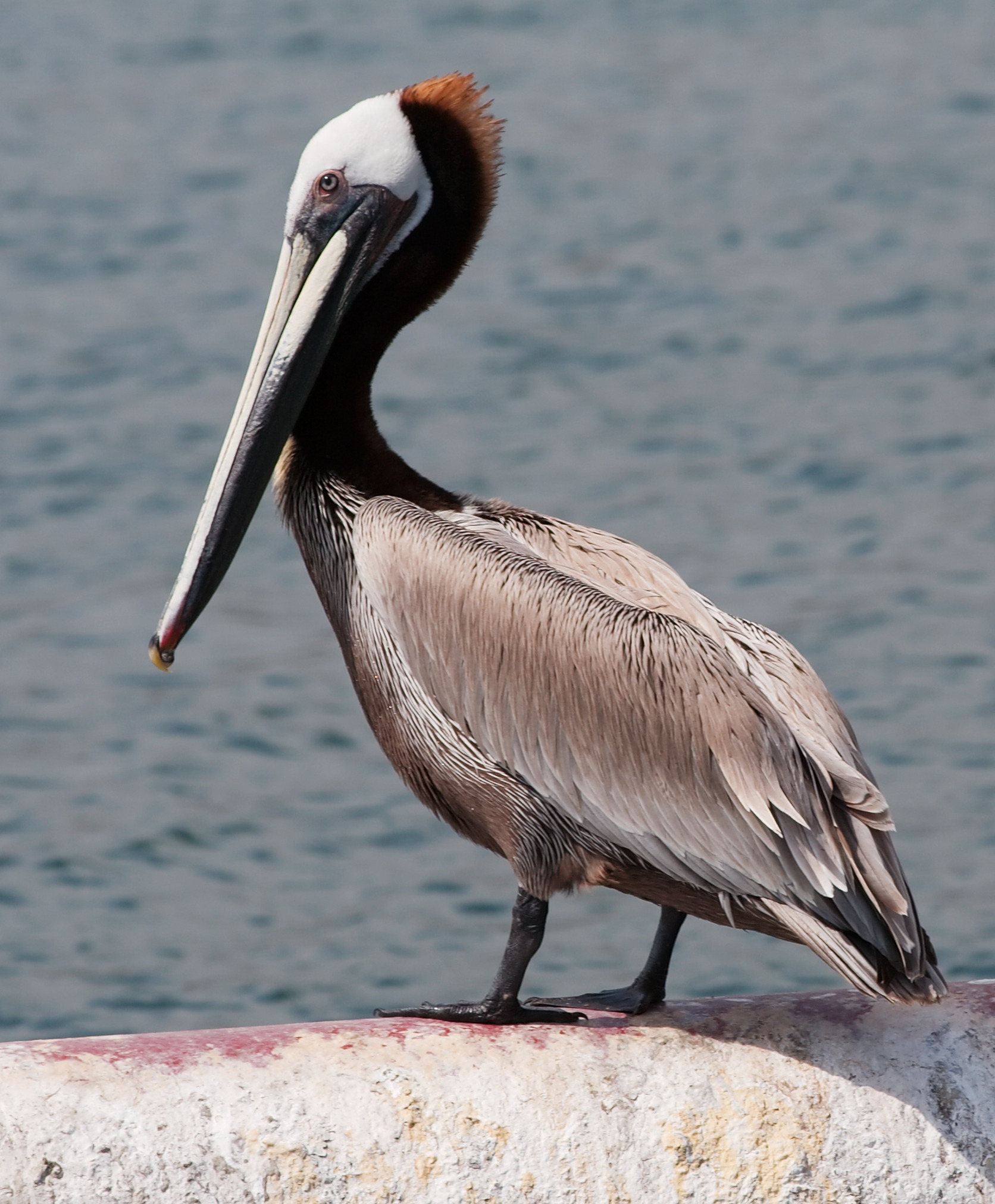
A brown pelican (Pelecanus occidentalis) in Santa Barbara, California

Pelicans, ibises, shoebills, egrets, herons, etc.

- Family Ardeidae – herons, egrets, and bitterns
  - Genus Agamia – agami heron
  - Genus Ardea
  - Genus Ardeola – pond herons
  - Genus Botaurus** Genus Butorides – green-backed herons
  - Genus Cochlearius – boat-billed heron
  - Genus Egretta
  - Genus Gorsachius
  - Genus Ixobrychus
  - Genus Nyctanassa – American night herons
  - Genus Nycticorax
  - Genus Pilherodius – capped heron
  - Genus Syrigma – whistling heron
  - Genus Tigriornis – white-crested tiger heron
  - Genus Tigrisoma
  - Genus Zebrilus – zigzag heron
  - Genus Zonerodius – forest bittern
- Family Balaenicipitidae
  - Genus Balaeniceps – shoebill
- Family Pelecanidae
  - Genus Pelecanus – pelicans
- Family Scopidae
  - Genus Scopus – hamerkop
- Family Threskiornithidae – ibises and spoonbills
  - Genus Bostrychia
  - Genus Cercibis – sharp-tailed ibis
  - Genus Eudocimus
  - Genus Geronticus
  - Genus Lophotibis – Madagascan ibis
  - Genus Mesembrinibis – green ibis
  - Genus Nipponia – crested ibis
  - Genus Phimosus – bare-faced ibis
  - Genus Platalea – spoonbills
  - Genus Plegadis
  - Genus Pseudibis
  - Genus Thaumatibis – giant ibis
  - Genus Theristicus
  - Genus Threskiornis

== Phaethontiformes ==
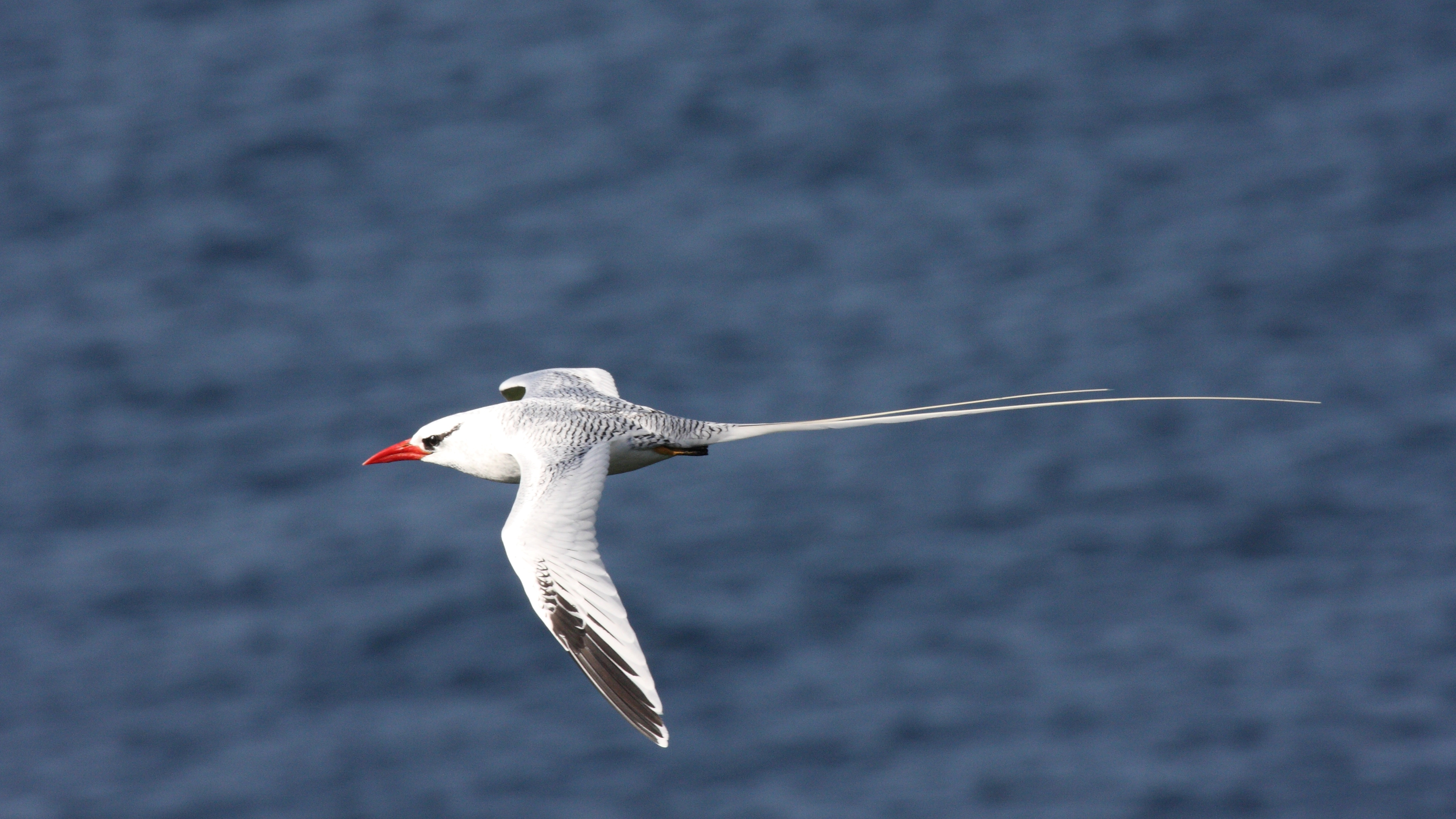
Red-billed tropicbird (Phaethon aethereus subsp. mesonauta) in waters around Trinidad & Tobago

- Family Phaethontidae
  - Genus Phaethon – tropicbirds

== Phoenicopteriformes ==
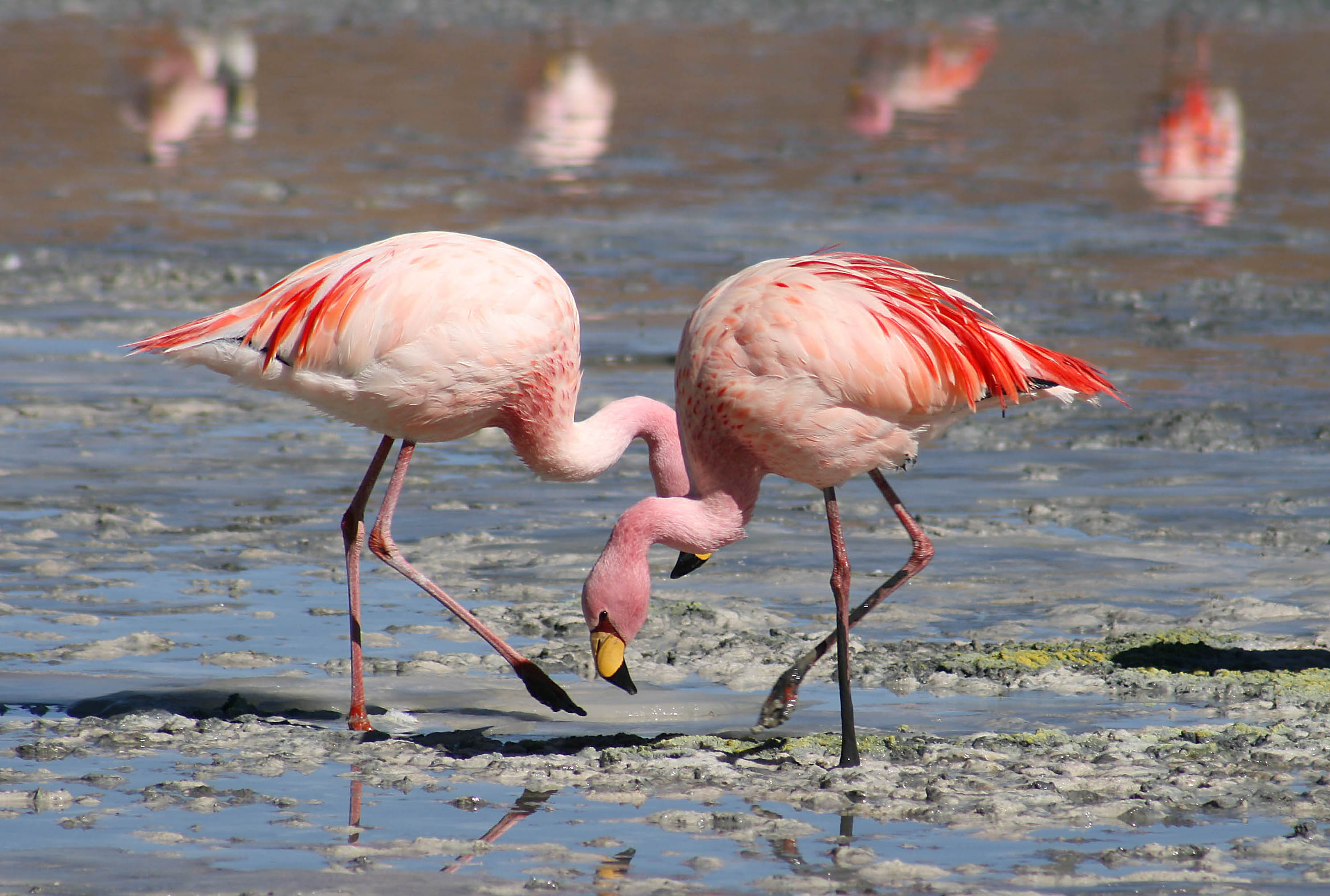
James's flamingos at Laguna Colorada in Bolivia

- Family Phoenicopteridae – flamingos
  - Genus Phoeniconaias – lesser flamingo
  - Genus Phoenicoparrus
  - Genus Phoenicopterus

== Piciformes ==
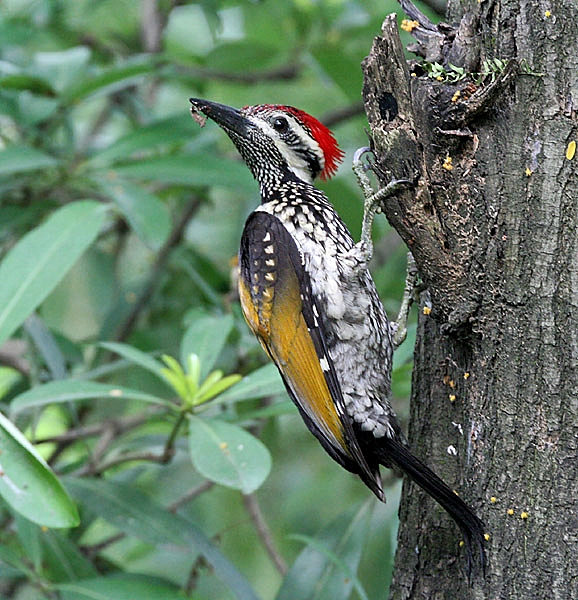
A black-rumped flameback using its tail for support

Woodpeckers, flickers, toucans, aracaris, motmots, etc.

- Family Bucconidae – puffbirds, nunbirds, and nunlets
  - Genus Bucco
  - Genus Chelidoptera – swallow-winged puffbird
  - Genus Hapaloptila – white-faced nunbird
  - Genus Hypnelus
  - Genus Malacoptila
  - Genus Micromonacha – lanceolated monklet
  - Genus Monasa
  - Genus Nonnula
  - Genus Notharchus
  - Genus Nystalus
- Family Capitonidae – American barbets
  - Genus Capito
  - Genus Eubucco
- Family Galbulidae – jacamars
  - Genus Brachygalba
  - Genus Galbalcyrhynchus
  - Genus Galbula
  - Genus Jacamaralcyon – three-toed jacamar
  - Genus Jacamerops – great jacamar
- Family Indicatoridae – honeyguides
  - Genus Indicator
  - Genus Melichneutes – lyre-tailed honeyguide
  - Genus Melignomon
  - Genus Prodotiscus – honeybirds
- Family Lybiidae – African barbets
  - Genus Buccanodon – yellow-spotted barbet
  - Genus Gymnobucco
  - Genus Lybius
  - Genus Pogoniulus – tinkerbirds
  - Genus Pogonornis
  - Genus Stactolaema
  - Genus Trachyphonus
  - Genus Tricholaema
- Family Megalaimidae – Asian barbets
  - Genus Caloramphus
  - Genus Psilopogon
- Family Picidae – woodpeckers, piculets, and wrynecks
  - Genus Blythipicus
  - Genus Campephilus
  - Genus Campethera
  - Genus Celeus
  - Genus Chloropicus
  - Genus Chrysocolaptes – flamebacks
  - Genus Chrysophlegma
  - Genus Colaptes – flickers
  - Genus Dendrocopos
  - Genus Dendrocoptes
  - Genus Dendropicos
  - Genus Dinopium – flamebacks
  - Genus Dryobates
  - Genus Dryocopus
  - Genus Gecinulus
  - Genus Geocolaptes – ground woodpeckers
  - Genus Hemicircus
  - Genus Jynx – wrynecks
  - Genus Leiopicus – yellow-crowned woodpecker
  - Genus Leuconotopicus
  - Genus Meiglyptes
  - Genus Melanerpes
  - Genus Micropternus – rufous woodpecker
  - Genus Mulleripicus
  - Genus Nesoctites – Antillean piculet
  - Genus Picoides
  - Genus Piculus
  - Genus Picumnus – American piculets
  - Genus Picus
  - Genus Reinwardtipicus – orange-backed woodpecker
  - Genus Sasia – Asian piculets
  - Genus Sphyrapicus – sapsuckers
  - Genus Veniliornis
  - Genus Xiphidiopicus – Cuban green woodpecker
  - Genus Yungipicus
- Family Ramphastidae – toucans
  - Genus Andigena – mountain toucans
  - Genus Aulacorhynchus – green toucanet
  - Genus Pteroglossus – aracaris
  - Genus Ramphastos
  - Genus Selenidera
- Family Semnornithidae – toucan-barbets
  - Genus Semnornis

== Podicipediformes ==
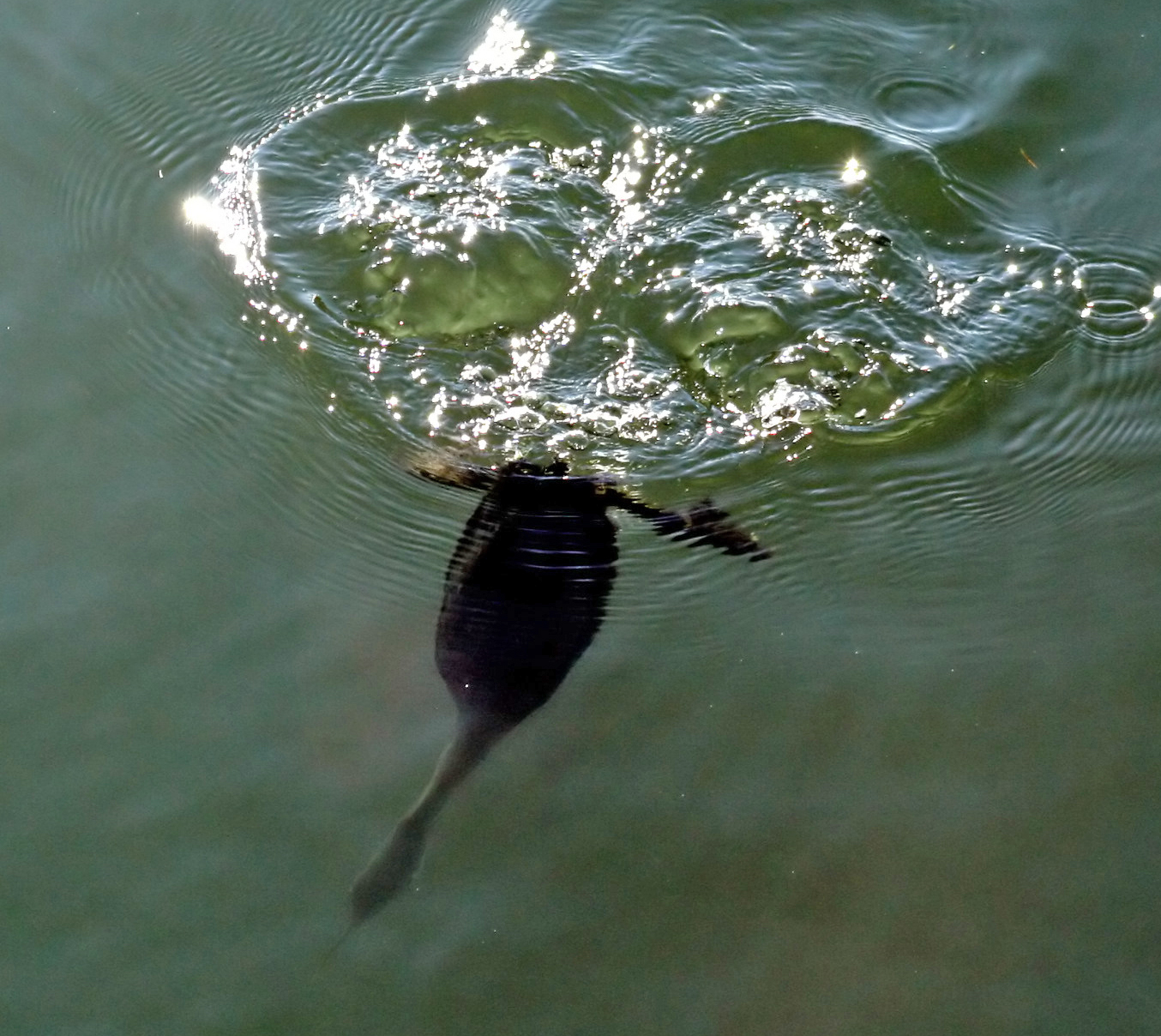
Diving grebe

- Family Podicipedidae – grebes
  - Genus Aechmophorus
  - Genus Podicephorus – great grebe
  - Genus Podiceps
  - Genus Podilymbus
  - Genus Poliocephalus
  - Genus Rollandia
  - Genus Tachybaptus

== Procellariiformes ==
Petrels, storm petrels, albatrosses, and diving petrels

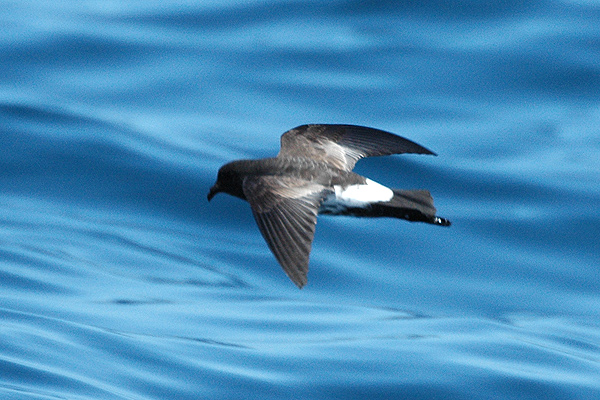
The poorly known New Zealand storm petrel was considered extinct for 150 years before being rediscovered in 2003.

- Family Diomedeidae – albatrosses
  - Genus Diomedea – great albatrosses
  - Genus Phoebastria – North Pacific albatrosses
  - Genus Phoebetria
  - Genus Thalassarche – "mollymawks"
- Family Hydrobatidae – northern storm petrels
  - Genus Hydrobates – northern storm petrels
- Family Oceanitidae – southern storm petrels
  - Genus Fregetta
  - Genus Garrodia – grey-backed storm petrel
  - Genus Nesofregetta – Polynesian storm petrel
  - Genus Oceanites
  - Genus Pelagodroma – white-faced storm petrel
- Family Procellariidae
  - Genus Aphrodroma – Kerguelen petrel
  - Genus Ardenna – large shearwaters
  - Genus Bulweria
  - Genus Calonectris – shearwaters
  - Genus Daption – Cape petrel
  - Genus Fulmarus – fulmars
  - Genus Halobaena – blue petrel
  - Genus Macronectes – giant petrels
  - Genus Pachyptila
  - Genus Pagodroma – snow petrel
  - Genus Pelecanoides – diving petrels
  - Genus Procellaria
  - Genus Pseudobulweria
  - Genus Pterodroma – gadfly petrels
  - Genus Puffinus – shearwaters
  - Genus Thalassoica – Antarctic petrel

== Psittaciformes ==
Parrots, parakeets, macaws, and cockatoos

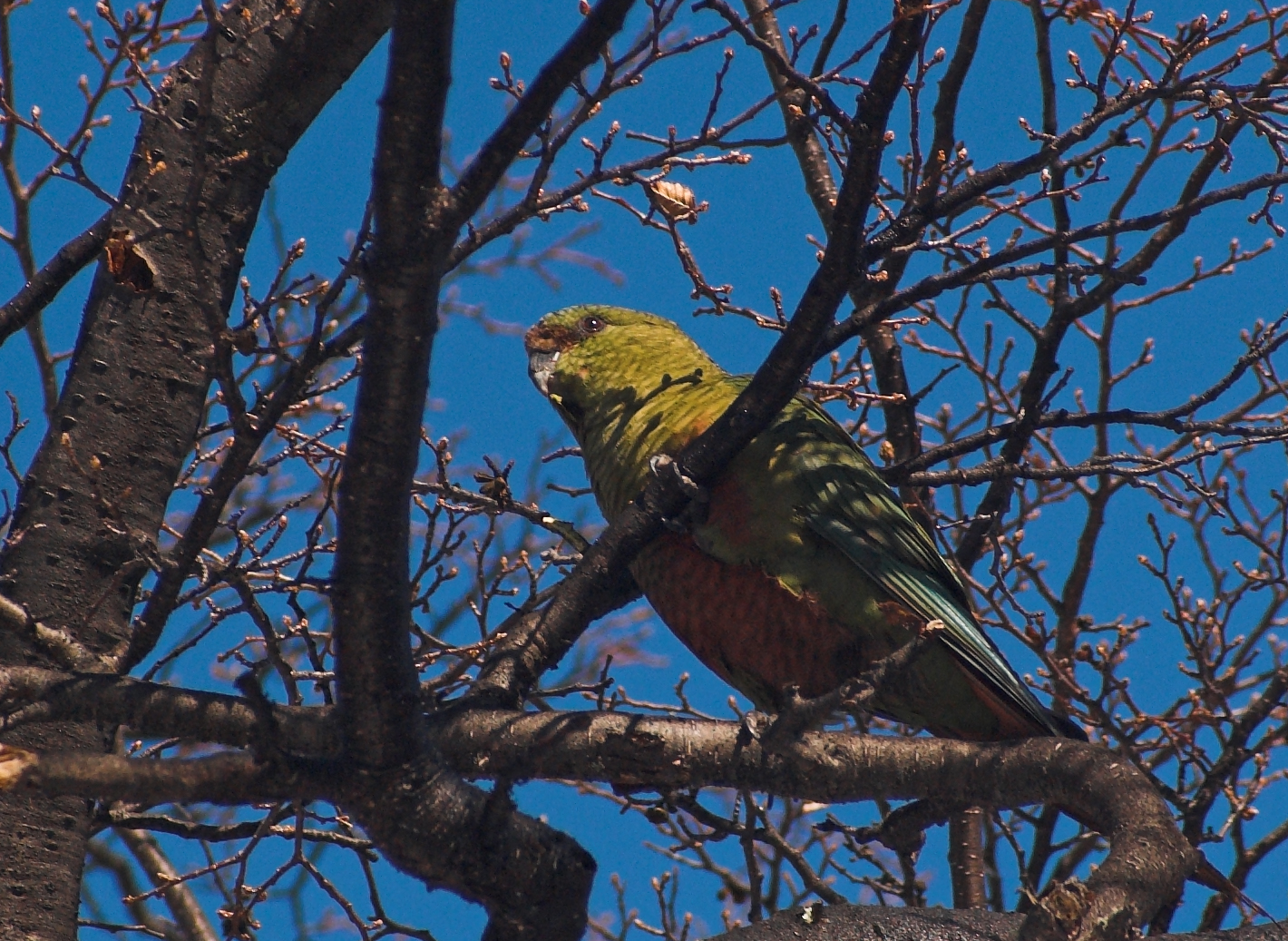
Most parrot species are tropical, but a few species, like this austral parakeet, range deeply into temperate zones.

- Family Cacatuidae – cockatoos
  - Genus Cacatua
  - Genus Callocephalon – gang-gang cockatoo
  - Genus Calyptorhynchus
  - Genus Eolophus – galah
  - Genus Lophochroa – Major Mitchell's cockatoo
  - Genus Nymphicus – cockatiel
  - Genus Probosciger – palm cockatoo
- Family Nestoridae – New Zealand parrots
  - Genus Nestor
- Family Psittacidae – New World and African parrots
  - Genus Alipiopsitta – yellow-faced parrot
  - Genus Amazona – "Amazons"
  - Genus Anodorhynchus
  - Genus Ara
  - Genus Aratinga
  - Genus Bolborhynchus
  - Genus Brotogeris
  - Genus Conuropsis – Carolina parakeet
  - Genus Coracopsis – vasa parrot
  - Genus Cyanoliseus – burrowing parrot
  - Genus Cyanopsitta – Spix's macaw
  - Genus Deroptyus – red-fan parrot
  - Genus Diopsittaca – red-shouldered macaw
  - Genus Enicognathus
  - Genus Eupsittula
  - Genus Forpus
  - Genus Graydidascalus – short-tailed parrot
  - Genus Guaruba – golden parakeet
  - Genus Hapalopsittaca
  - Genus Leptosittaca – golden-plumed parakeet
  - Genus Myiopsitta
  - Genus Nannopsittaca
  - Genus Ognorhynchus – yellow-eared parrot
  - Genus Orthopsittaca – red-bellied macaw
  - Genus Pionites – caiques
  - Genus Pionopsitta – pileated parrot
  - Genus Pionus
  - Genus Poicephalus
  - Genus Primolius
  - Genus Psilopsiagon
  - Genus Psittacara
  - Genus Psittacus – grey parrot and Timneh parrot
  - Genus Pyrilia
  - Genus Pyrrhura
  - Genus Rhynchopsitta
  - Genus Thectocercus – blue-crowned parakeet
  - Genus Touit
  - Genus Triclaria – blue-bellied parrot
- Family Psittaculidae – Old World parrots
  - Genus Agapornis – lovebirds
  - Genus Alisterus
  - Genus Aprosmictus
  - Genus Barnardius – Australian ringneck
  - Genus Bolbopsittacus – guaiabero
  - Genus Chalcopsitta
  - Genus Charmosyna
  - Genus Cyanoramphus
  - Genus Cyclopsitta
  - Genus Eclectus
  - Genus Eos
  - Genus Eunymphicus
  - Genus Geoffroyus
  - Genus Glossopsitta – musk lorikeet
  - Genus Lathamus – swift parrot
  - Genus Loriculus – hanging parrot
  - Genus Lorius
  - Genus Melopsittacus – budgerigar
  - Genus Micropsitta – pygmy parrot
  - Genus Neophema
  - Genus Neopsephotus – Bourke's parrot
  - Genus Neopsittacus
  - Genus Northiella – bluebonnet
  - Genus Oreopsittacus – plum-faced lorikeet
  - Genus Parvipsitta
  - Genus Pezoporus
  - Genus Phigys – collared lory
  - Genus Platycercus – rosellas
  - Genus Polytelis
  - Genus Prioniturus – racket-tails
  - Genus Prosopeia – shining parrot
  - Genus Psephotellus
  - Genus Psephotus – red-rumped parrot
  - Genus Pseudeos
  - Genus Psittacella – tiger parrot
  - Genus Psittacula
  - Genus Psittaculirostris
  - Genus Psitteuteles
  - Genus Psittinus
  - Genus Purpureicephalus – red-capped parrot
  - Genus Tanygnathus
  - Genus Trichoglossus
  - Genus Vini
- Family Psittrichasiidae
  - Genus Coracopsis – vasa parrot
  - Genus Psittrichas – Pesquet's parrot
- Family Strigopidae
  - Genus Strigops – kākāpō

== Pterocliformes ==
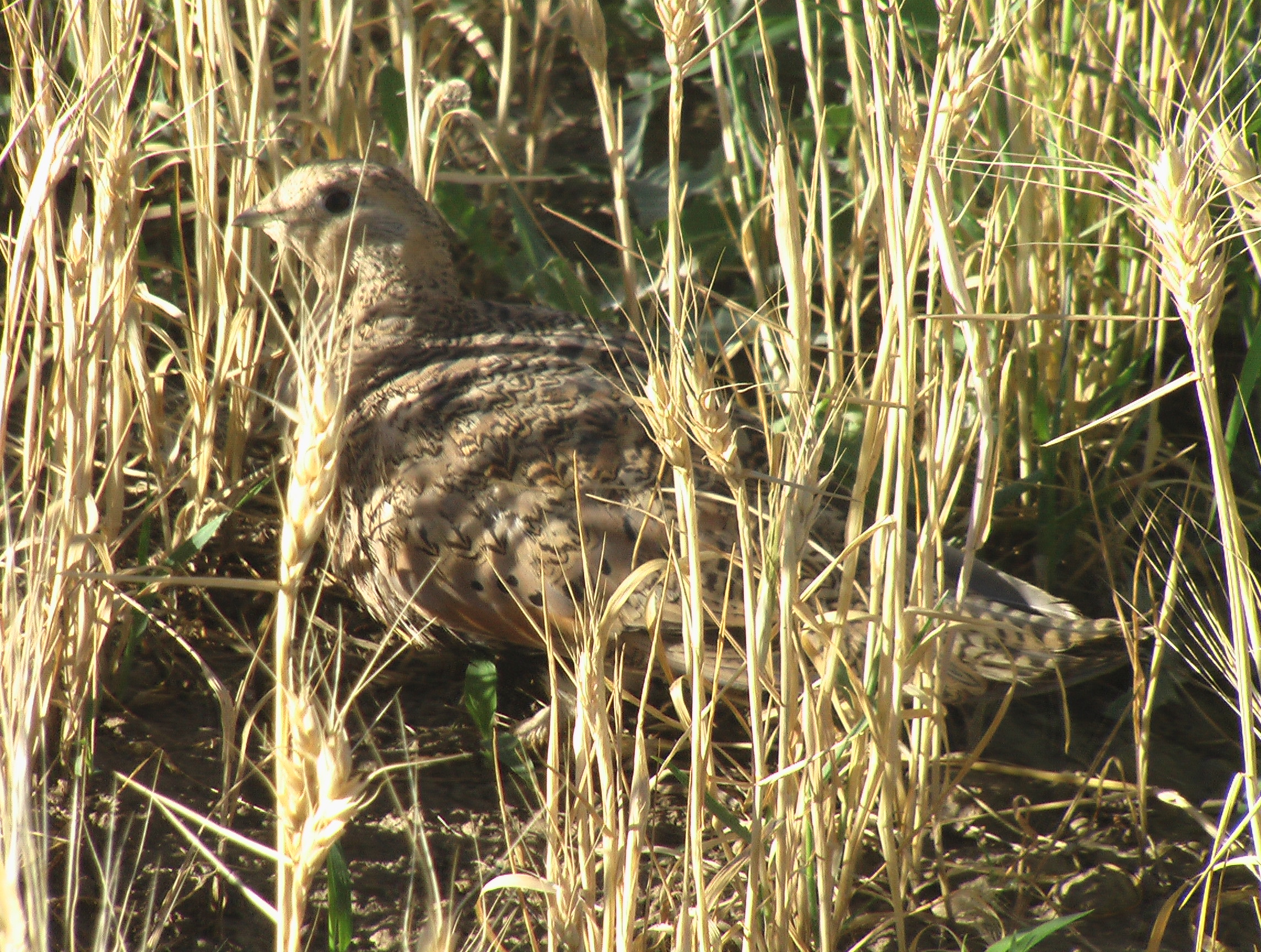
Pallas's sandgrouse in a field in the Gobi Desert

- Family Pteroclidae – sandgrouse
  - Genus Calopterocles
  - Genus Nyctiperdix
  - Genus Pterocles
  - Genus Syrrhaptes

== Rheiformes ==
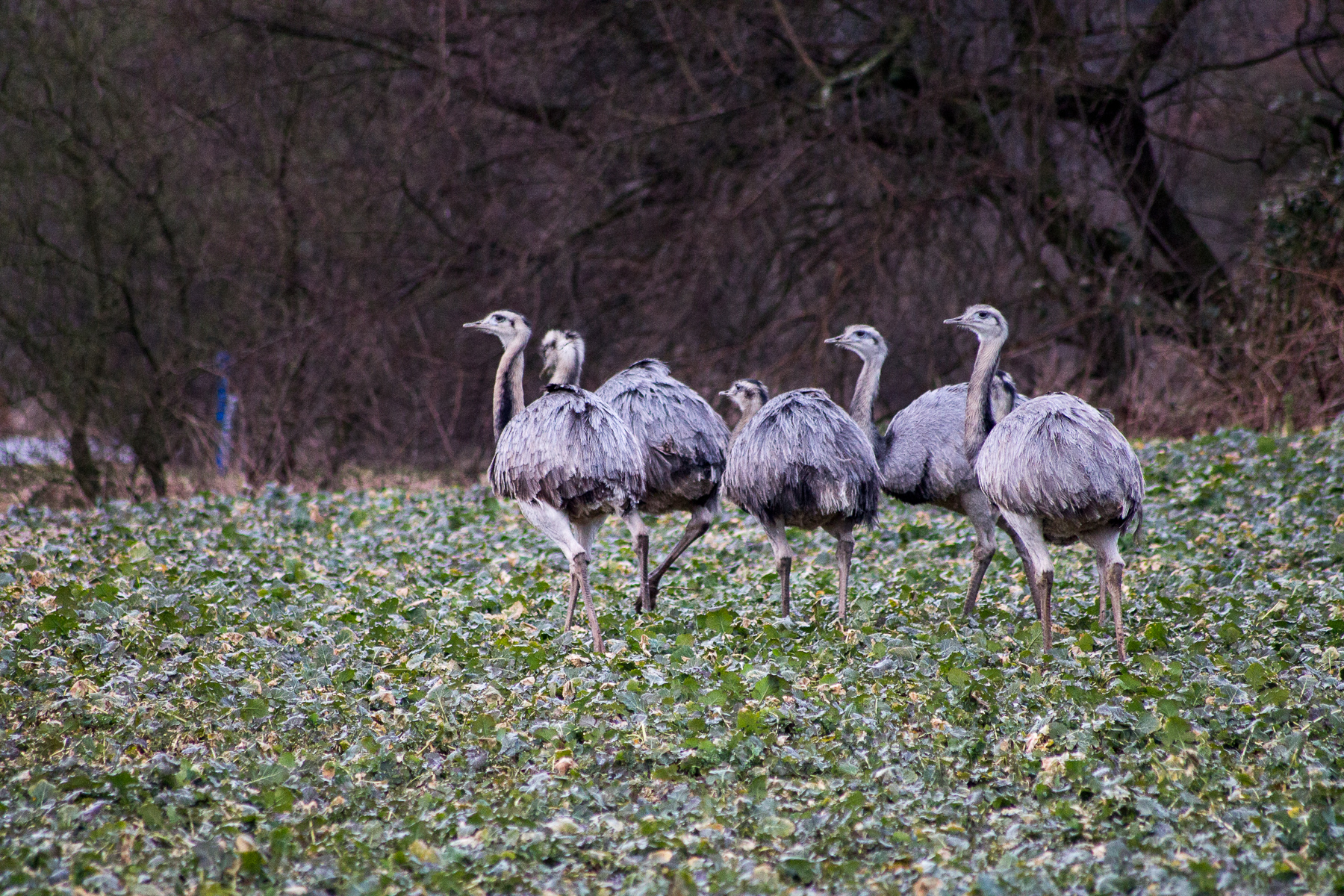
A flock of rhea in Lenschow, Mecklenburg-Vorpommern.

- Family Rheidae
  - Genus Rhea

== Sphenisciformes ==
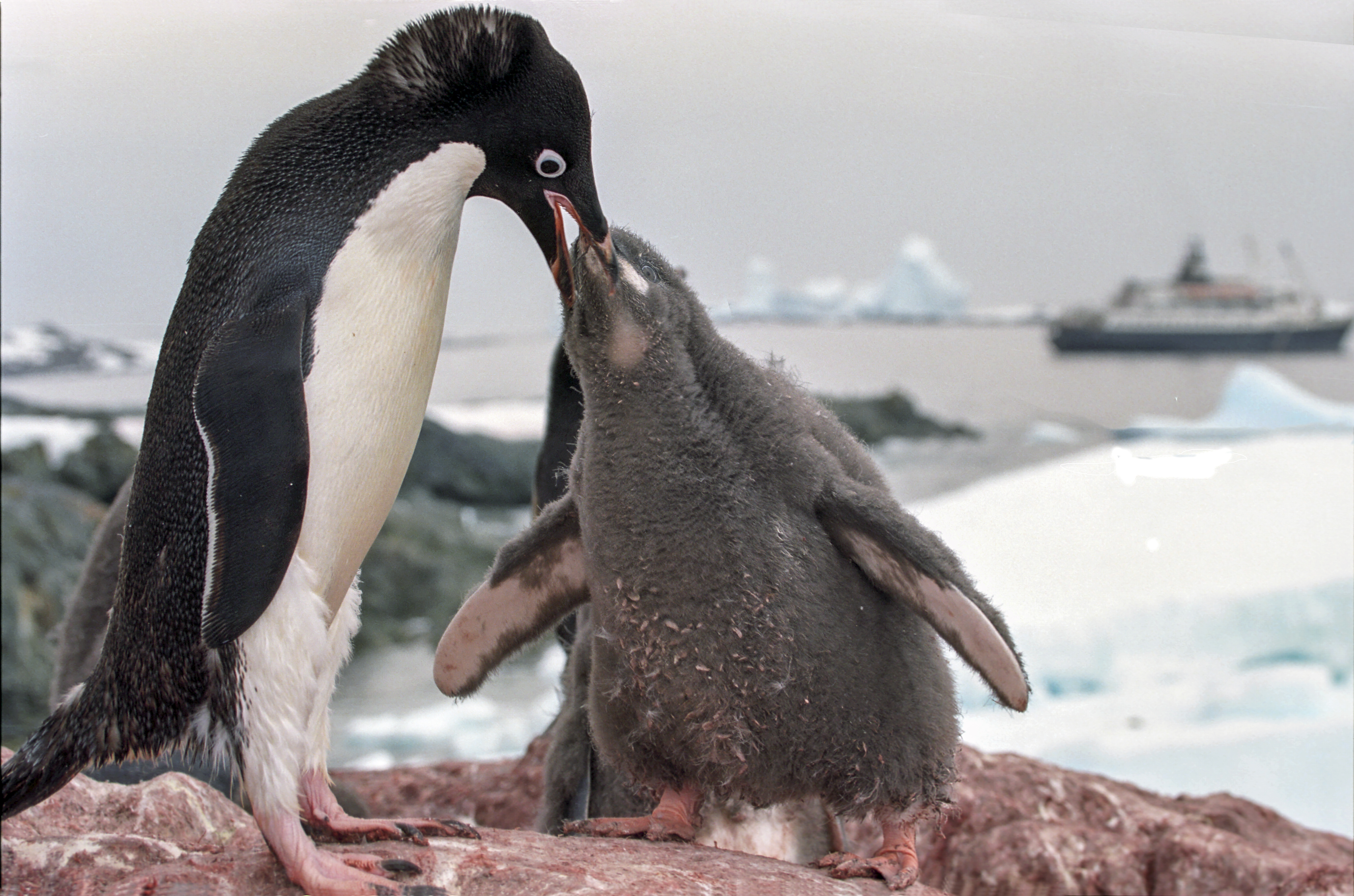
Adélie penguin (Pygoscelis adeliae) feeding young. Like its relatives, a neatly bi-coloured species with a head marking.

- Family Spheniscidae – penguins
  - Genus Aptenodytes
  - Genus Eudyptes – crested penguins
  - Genus Eudyptula
  - Genus Megadyptes
  - Genus Pygoscelis
  - Genus Spheniscus – banded penguins

== Strigiformes ==
Owls

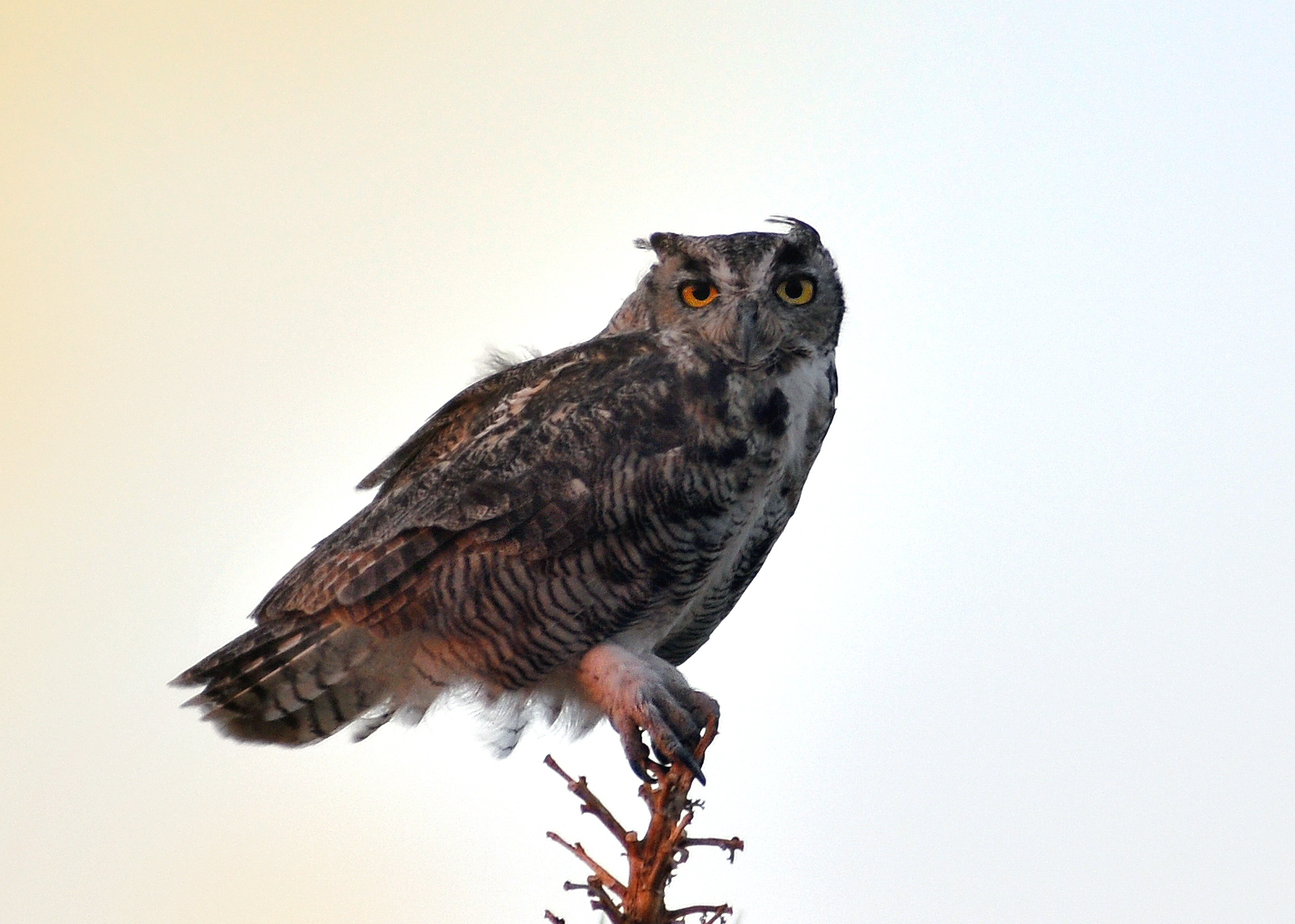
Great horned owl perched on the top of a Joshua tree at evening twilight in the Mojave Desert, US.

- Family Strigidae – true owls
  - Genus Aegolius – saw-whet owls
  - Genus Asio – eared owls
  - Genus Athene
  - Genus Bubo
  - Genus Ciccaba
  - Genus Glaucidium – pygmy owls
  - Genus Jubula – maned owl
  - Genus Ketupa – fish owls
  - Genus Lophostrix – crested owl
  - Genus Margarobyas – bare-legged owl
  - Genus Megascops – screech owls
  - Genus Micrathene – elf owl
  - Genus Nesasio – fearful owl
  - Genus Ninox – Asian and Australasian hawk-owls and boobooks
  - Genus Otus – scops owls
  - Genus Pseudoscops – Jamaican owl
  - Genus Psiloscops – flammulated owl
  - Genus Ptilopsis – white-faced owl
  - Genus Pulsatrix – spectacled owl
  - Genus Pyrroglaux – Palau owl
  - Genus Scotopelia – fishing owls
  - Genus Strix – earless owls
  - Genus Surnia – northern hawk-owl
  - Genus Uroglaux – Papuan hawk-owl
  - Genus Xenoglaux – long-whiskered owlet
- Family Tytonidae – barn owls
  - Genus Phodilus – bay owls
  - Genus Tyto

== Struthioniformes ==
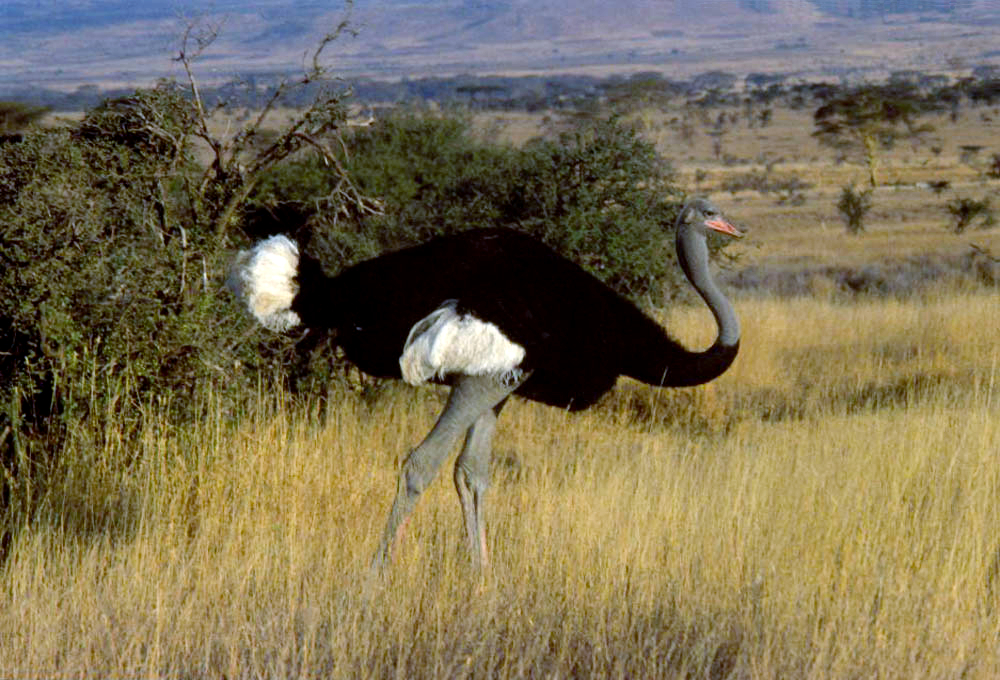
A male Somali ostrich in a Kenyan savanna, showing its blueish neck

- Family Struthionidae – ostriches
  - Genus Struthio

== Suliformes ==
Boobies, gannets, frigatebirds, cormorants, shags, and darters

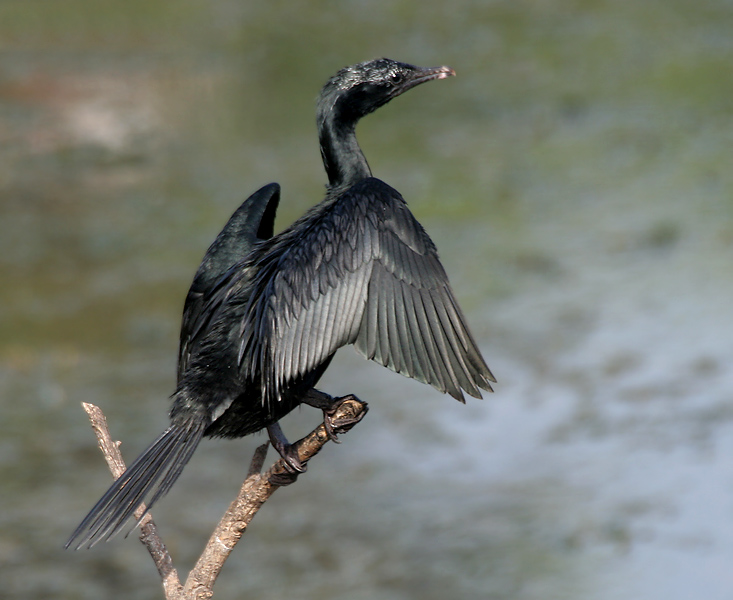
Little cormorant Phalacrocorax niger

- Family Anhingidae
  - Genus Anhinga – darters and anhinga
- Family Fregatidae
  - Genus Fregata – frigatebirds
- Family Phalacrocoracidae
  - Genus Phalacrocorax – cormorants and shags
- Family Sulidae
  - Genus Morus – gannets
  - Genus Papasula – Abbott's booby
  - Genus Sula – boobies

== Tinamiformes ==
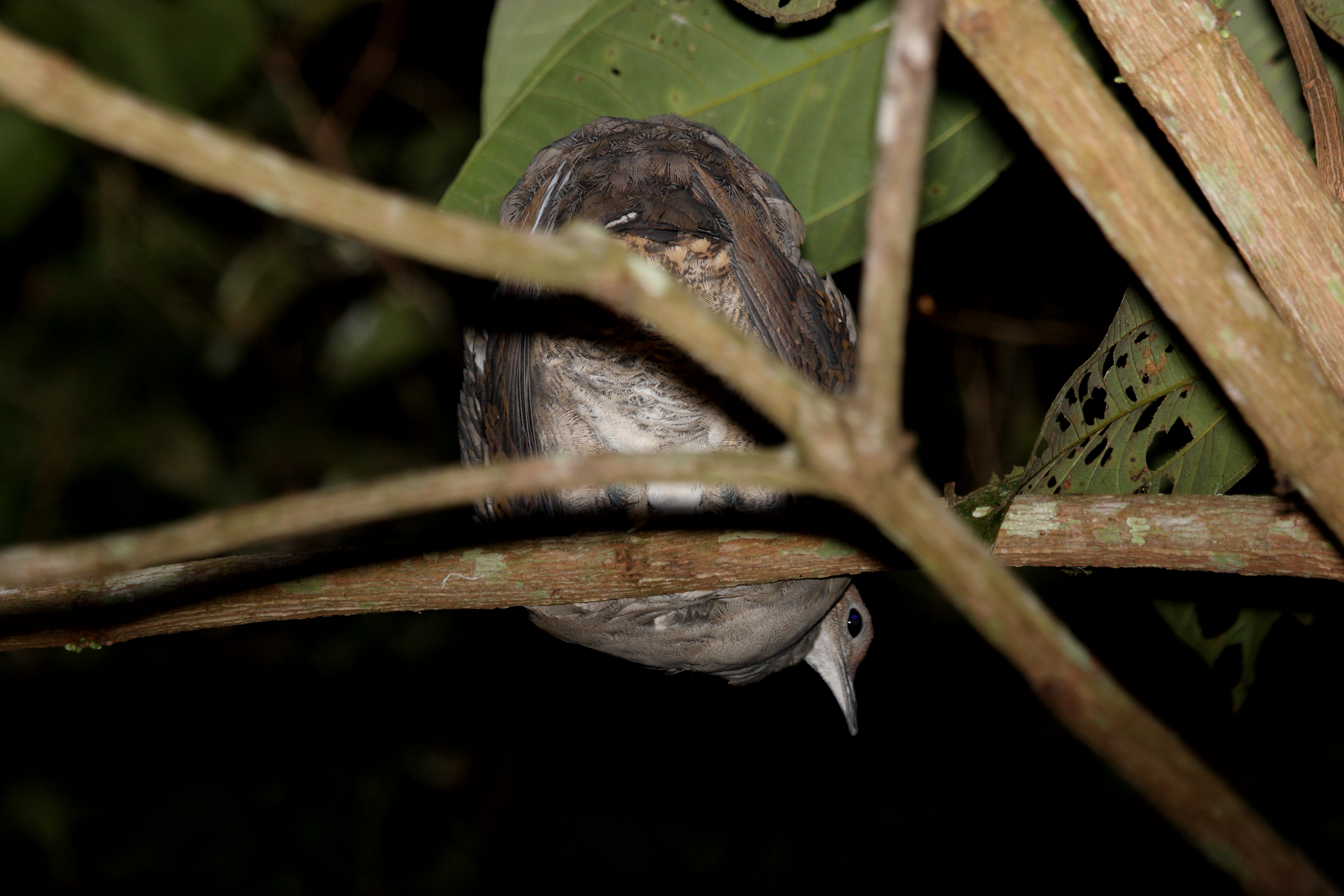
Great tinamou roosting

- Family Tinamidae – tinamous
  - Genus Crypturellus
  - Genus Eudromia
  - Genus Nothocercus
  - Genus Nothoprocta
  - Genus Nothura
  - Genus Rhynchotus
  - Genus Taoniscus – dwarf tinamou
  - Genus Tinamotis
  - Genus Tinamus

== Trogoniformes ==
Trogons and quetzals

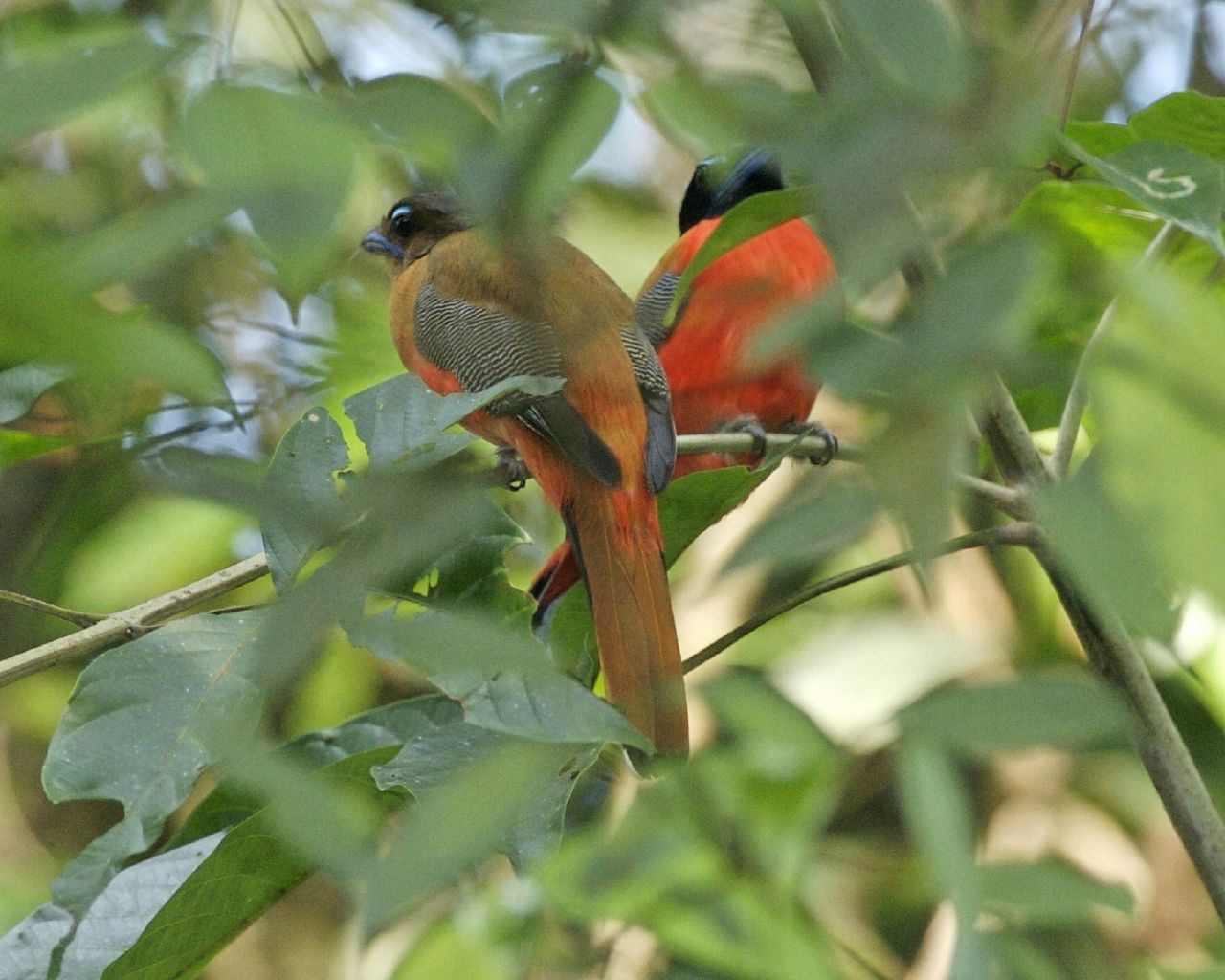
A pair of scarlet-rumped trogons, showing sexual dimorphism in the plumage. The female is on the left, male on the right.

- Family Trogonidae
  - Genus Apalharpactes
  - Genus Apaloderma
  - Genus Euptilotis – eared quetzal
  - Genus Harpactes
  - Genus Pharomachrus
  - Genus Priotelus
  - Genus Trogon
