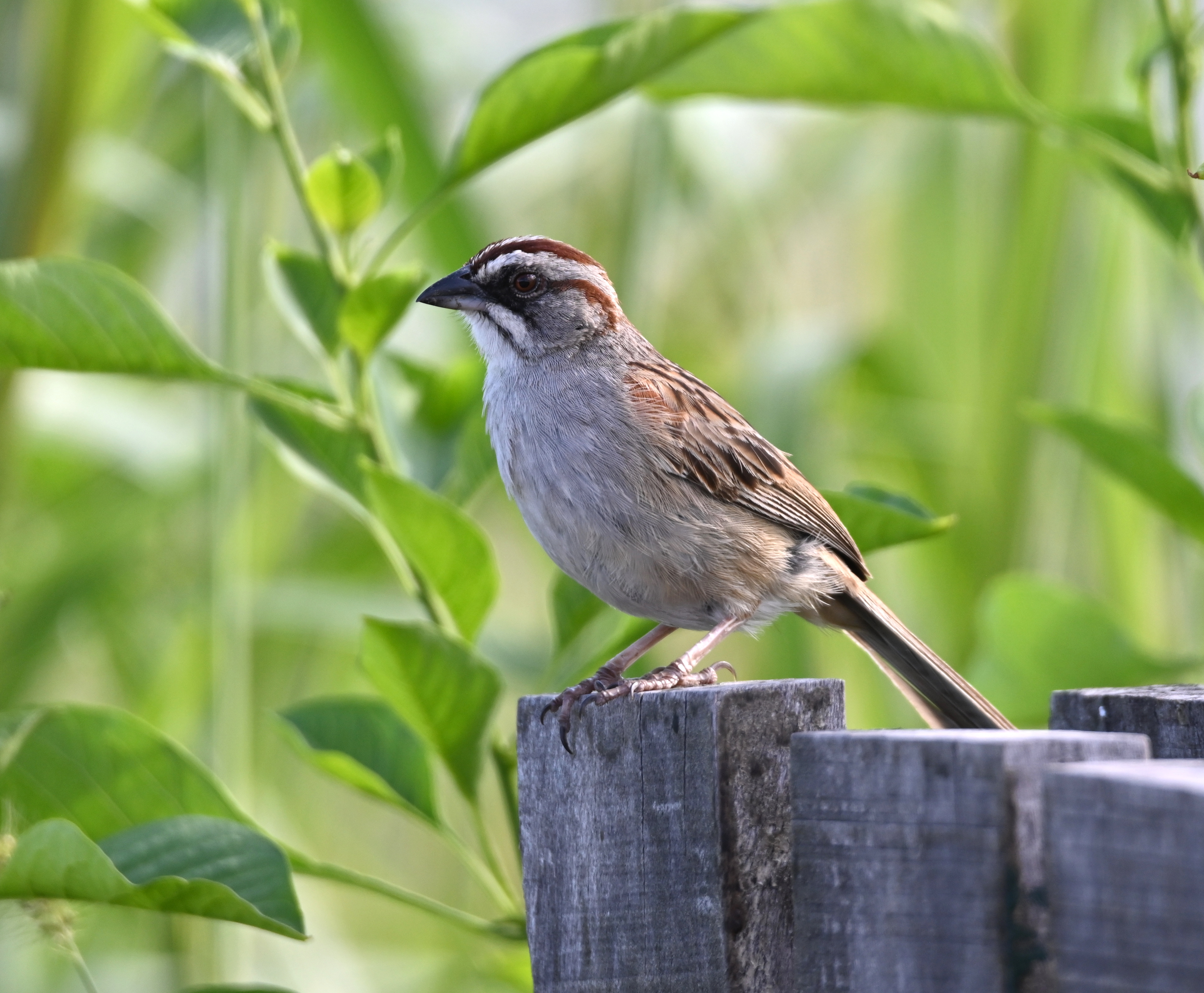

Conservation status
- Least Concern (IUCN 3.1)

Scientific classification
- Kingdom: Animalia
- Phylum: Chordata
- Class: Aves
- Order: Passeriformes
- Family: Passerellidae
- Genus: Rhynchospiza
- Species: R. dabbenei

Binomial name
- Rhynchospiza dabbenei (Hellmayr, 1912)

Synonyms
- Rhynchospiza strigiceps dabbenei; Aimophila strigiceps dabbenei; Peucaea strigiceps dabbenei; Zonotrichia strigiceps dabbenei

= Yungas sparrow =

Species of bird

The Yungas sparrow (Rhynchospiza dabbenei) is a species of bird in the family Passerellidae endemic to the Southern Andean Yungas of southeastern Bolivia and northwestern Argentina. It was formerly considered a subspecies of what was then called the stripe-capped sparrow (R. strigiceps).

== Taxonomy and systematics ==
The Yungas sparrow was previously classified as a subspecies of Rhynchospiza strigiceps, which was at that time called the stripe-capped sparrow. Before that, Rhynchospiza had been subsumed into genus Aimophila. A 2009 publication restored the genus Rhynchospiza and a 2019 publication split R. dabbenei from R. strigiceps. Based on the 2019 publication, in June 2020 the South American Classification Committee (SACC) of the American Ornithological Society (AOS) accepted R. dabbenei as the Yungas sparrow and renamed R. strigiceps Chaco sparrow. The International Ornithological Congress (IOC) followed suit in January 2021.

== Description ==
The Yungas sparrow is larger than its former "parent" R. strigiceps. Its upper parts are brown with darker streaks and varying amounts of rust and gray. It is pale gray below blending to buff on the flanks and in the vent area. The head is gray with chestnut crown and postocular stripes, black lores, and a white moustachial stripe.

== Distribution and habitat ==
The Yungas sparrow is a year-round resident of the Southern Andean Yungas, a narrow region on the eastern side of the Andes in southwestern Bolivia and northwestern Argentina. The area is characterized by a subtropical highland climate and evergreen forest.

== Vocalization ==
The Yungas sparrow's song is a series of chirps that contrast with the complex trills of the Chaco sparrow.
