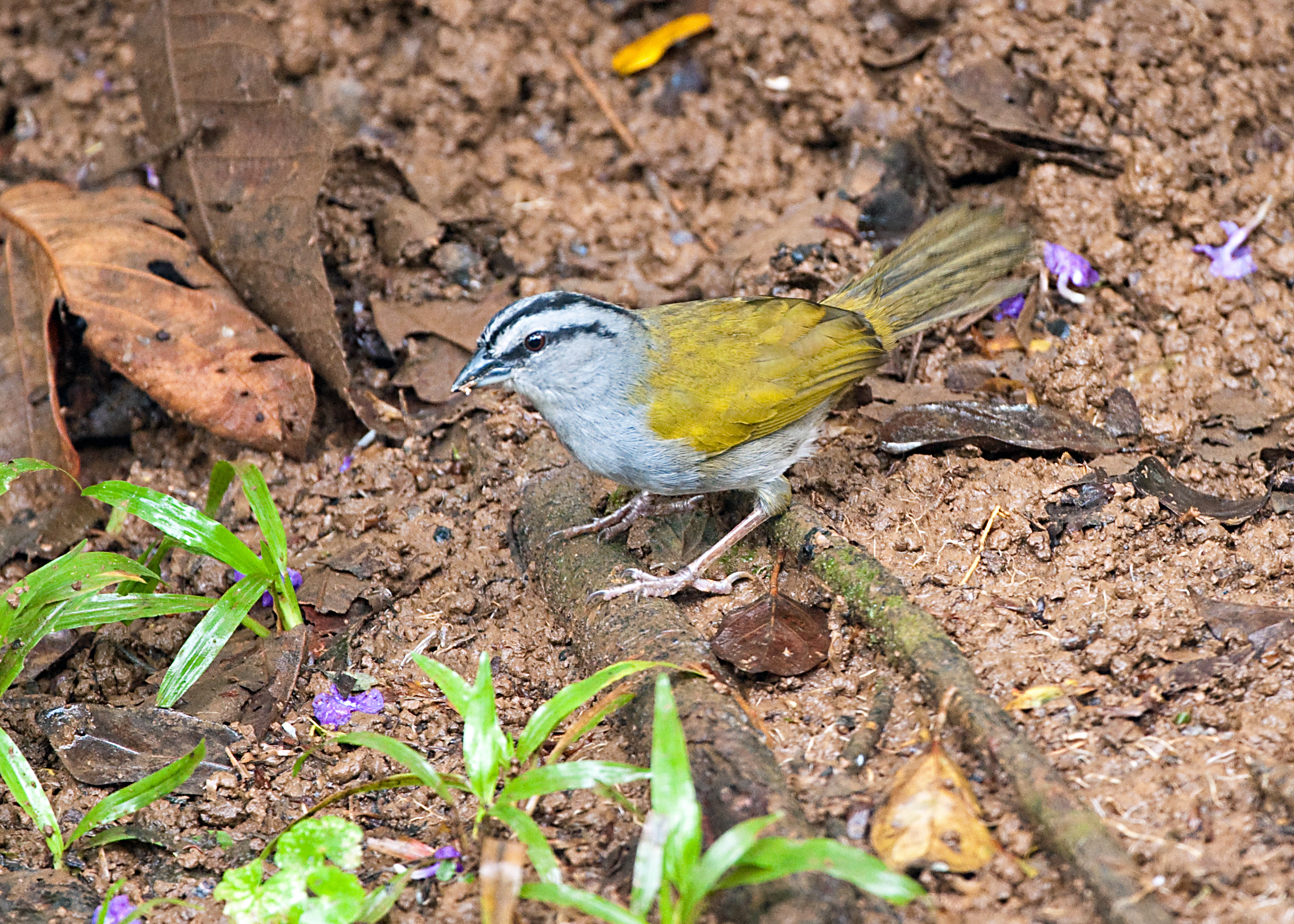
- At Cordillera de Talamanca, Costa Rica

Conservation status
- Least Concern (IUCN 3.1)

Scientific classification
- Kingdom: Animalia
- Phylum: Chordata
- Class: Aves
- Order: Passeriformes
- Family: Passerellidae
- Genus: Arremonops
- Species: A. conirostris

Binomial name
- Arremonops conirostris (Bonaparte, 1850)

= Black-striped sparrow =

Species of bird

The black-striped sparrow (Arremonops conirostris) is a species of bird in the family Passerellidae, the New World sparrows. It is found from Honduras south to Ecuador and Brazil. There are also unconfirmed reports in Peru.

== Taxonomy and systematics ==
The black-striped sparrow was formally described in 1850 with the binomial Arremon conirostris. Eventually it was reassigned to genus Arremonops that Robert Ridgway erected in 1896, and for much of the first half of the twentieth century it was treated as conspecific with A. chloronotus, now called the green-backed sparrow.

The black-striped sparrow's further taxonomy is unsettled. The IOC and AviList assign it these six subspecies:

- A. c. striaticeps (Lafresnaye, 1853)
- A. c. viridicatus Wetmore, 1957
- A. c. inexpectatus Chapman, 1914
- A. c. conirostris (Bonaparte, 1850)
- A. c. umbrinus Todd, 1923
- A. c. pastazae Krabbe & Stejskal, 2008

As of late 2025 the Clements taxonomy recognizes a seventh, A. c. richmondii (Ridgway, 1898), which the other two systems include as part of A. c. striaticeps. Clements does not recognize A. c. viridicatus but includes it in A. c. richmondii. Also as of late 2025, BirdLife International's Handbook of the Birds of the World recognizes all seven subspecies.

This article primarily follows the IOC/AviList six-subspecies model but includes some information about A. c. richmondii.

== Description ==
The black-striped sparrow is about 16.5 cm (6.5 in) long and weighs 26 to 42 g (0.92 to 1.5 oz). The sexes have the same plumage. Adults of the nominate subspecies A. c. conirostris have a mostly gray head with wide black stripes on each side of the crown and a thin black strip through the eye. Their upperparts, tail, and wings are olive-green with yellow at the bend of the wing. Their throat is whitish, their breast and sides pale gray, their belly whitish, and their lower flanks and undertail coverts washed with olive-buff. Juveniles have a yellowish olive head with dark brown stripes, dusky-streaked brownish olive upperparts, and yellowish olive underparts with dark brown streaks.

The other subspecies of the black-striped sparrow differ from the nominate and each other thus:

- A. c. striaticeps: thin black crown stripes; lighter more yellowish upperparts and paler gray underparts than nominate
- A. c. viridicatus: similar to striaticeps but overall darker
- A. c. inexpectatus: smallest subspecies; brownish olive upperparts
- A. c. umbrinus: like inexpectatus but somewhat larger and brighter
- A. c. pastazae: larger than nominate, with grayer (much less greenish) upperparts, pure white throat, whiter belly, and light grayish undertail coverts

All subspecies have a dark red-brown iris, a blackish bill, and pinkish to brownish gray legs and feet.

When it is considered separately, subspecies A. c. richmondii is described as having a darker gray head and brighter olive upperparts than the nominate.

== Distribution and habitat ==
The black-striped sparrow has a disjunct distribution. The subspecies are found thus:

- A. c. striaticeps: across eastern Honduras and south along the Caribbean slope through Nicaragua, Costa Rica, and Panama into northern Colombia; on the Pacific slope from Costa Rica's central Puntarenas Province through Panama into northern Colombia; separately on the Pacific slope from southwestern Colombia's Cauca Department south through Ecuador to southern Guayas Province The South American Classification Committee has at least one unconfirmed sight record in Peru.
- A. c. viridicatus: Coiba Island off the Pacific coast of Panama
- A. c. inexpectatus: upper valley of northern Colombia's Magdalena River
- A. c. conirostris: northern Colombia from Bolívar Department east to the Sierra Nevada de Santa Marta and south in the lower and middle Magdalena valley and along the eastern slope of the Eastern Andes to Boyacá Department; eastern slope of Venezuelan Andes from Táchira and western Apure north to Portuguesa and east across southern Cojedes and western Guárico; northwestern Venezuela's Lara and Falcón; across northern Venezuela from Yaracuy and Carabobo east to Sucre and Monagas; across northern Bolívar in central Venezuela; separately in extreme northern Brazil
- A. c. umbrinus Serranía del Perijá on the Colombia-Venezuela border; eastern Colombia's Norte de Santander Department and east along western slope of Venezuelan Andes from Táchira to Trujillo
- A. c. pastazae: isolated in eastern Ecuador along the Pastaza River where Pastaza and Morona-Santiago provinces meet

When they are considered separately, subspecies A. c. richmondii is found from Honduras to western Panama and A. c. striaticeps is found in the rest of Panama and in Colombia and Ecuador as above.

In most of its range the black-striped sparrow inhabits a variety of low-stature landscapes including young secondary forest, the edges of humid woodlands, fields and pastures with shrubs and thickets, and shady plantations and gardens. Subspecies A. c. pastazae inhabits river sandbars with dense stands of Tessaria integrifolia. In elevation it is found from sea level to 600 m (2,000 ft) in Honduras, to 800 m (2,600 ft) in Costa Rica, to 1,600 m (5,200 ft) in Colombia, to 1,400 m (4,600 ft) in Ecuador, to 1,300 m (4,300 ft) north of the Orinoco River in Venezuela, and to 300 m (1,000 ft) south of it.. It reaches 1,500 m (4,900 ft) in its tiny Brazilian range.

== Behavior ==
=== Movement ===
The black-striped sparrow is generally a year-round resident thought it is thought that some individuals move to lower elevations after breeding.

=== Feeding ===
The black-striped sparrow primarily feeds on insects, seeds, and fruits; it has also been recorded occasionally taking small lizards and frogs. It forages while hopping on the ground and also gleans from low vegetation.

=== Breeding ===
The black-striped sparrow's breeding season has not been defined except in Colombia. There its season spans from January to October but is concentrated between April and July. The female builds the nest, an oven-shaped mass of leaves, ferns, grasses, and other coarse plant material lined with finer fibers and with a side entrance. It is typically placed in dense vegetation up to about 2 m (7 ft) above the ground. The clutch is one to three eggs but usually two; they are plain whitish. The female alone incubates, for 13 to 14 days. Fledging occurs about 11 or 12 days after hatch and both parents provision the nestlings.

=== Vocalization ===
The black-striped sparrow's song in Honduras is described as "several rich calls before accelerating into a longer series, wareep-weep!-warih-weep!-chu-chu-chu-chu-chu'chu'chu'chu'chu'chu'chu'tu'tu'tu'tu'tu'tu'tu'tu-weep!". In Venezuela it has at least three songs, "a slow, measured wü...wee, chivit, chivit, chivit, chivit, chivit", a "tsweet-tsweet, tsweet-tseeu, ti-ti-ti" that ends in a slow trill, and "tur, cheee, tu chup-chup-chup-chup-chup". The primary song of A. c. striaticeps in Ecuador is described as "an often-heard series of inflected, whistled ho-wheet notes". Another song there is "a series of well-enunciated notes delivered deliberately at first but then accelerating, e.g. cho; cho; cho, chocho-cho-cho-chochochochochch".

== Status ==
The IUCN has assessed the black-striped sparrow as being of Least Concern. It has a very large range; its estimated population of at least five million mature individuals is believed to be stable. No immediate threats have been identified. It is considered rare in northwestern Honduras and fairly common in the east. It is common in Costa Rica, fairly common in Colombia, "somewhat local" in western Ecuador, and fairly common in Venezuela. Subspecies A. c. pastazae "appears to be locally common".
