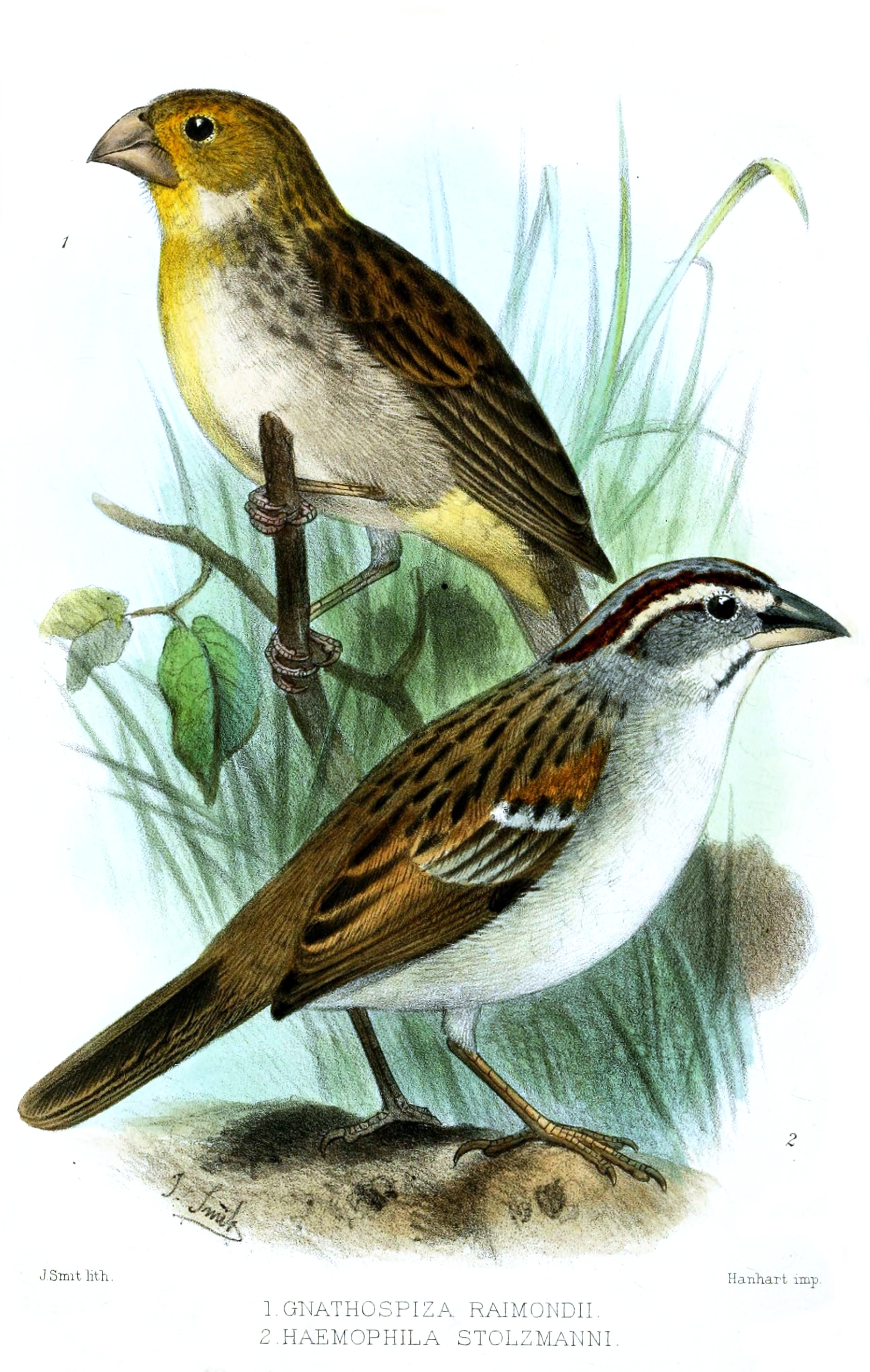
- A Tumbes sparrow (below), and a Raimondi's yellow finch (above)

Conservation status
- Least Concern (IUCN 3.1)

Scientific classification
- Kingdom: Animalia
- Phylum: Chordata
- Class: Aves
- Order: Passeriformes
- Family: Passerellidae
- Genus: Rhynchospiza
- Species: R. stolzmanni

Binomial name
- Rhynchospiza stolzmanni (Taczanowski, 1877)

Synonyms
- Aimophila stolzmanni

= Tumbes sparrow =

Species of bird

The Tumbes sparrow (Rhynchospiza stolzmanni) is a species of bird in the family Passerellidae found in Ecuador and Peru. Its natural habitats are subtropical or tropical dry forests and subtropical or tropical dry shrubland.

== Description ==
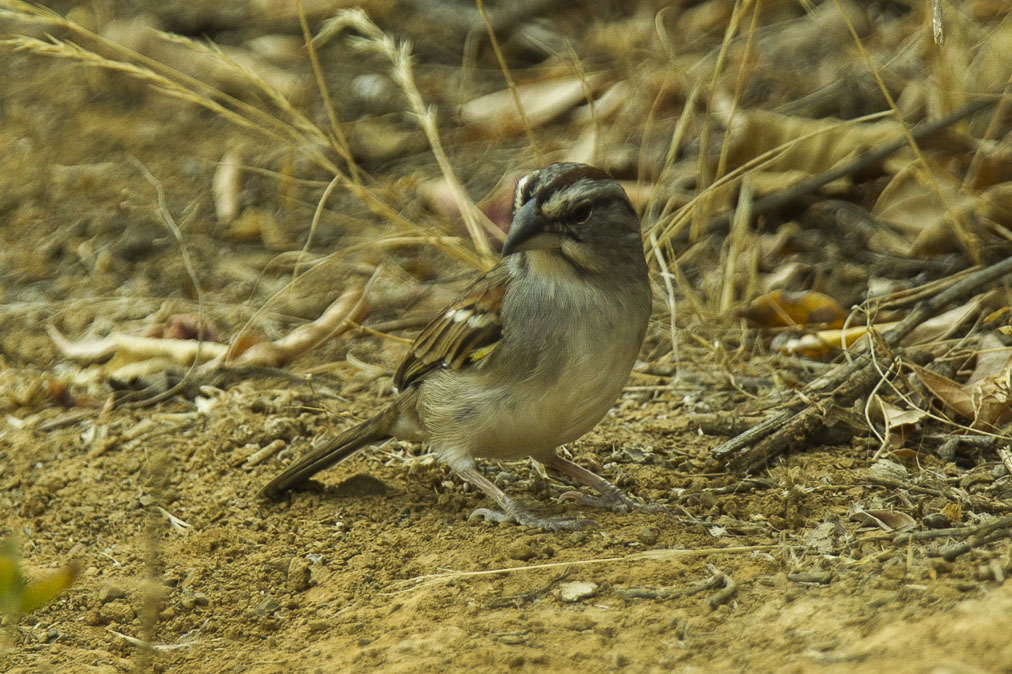
Tumbes sparrow in south Ecuador

The Tumbes sparrow is a medium-sized sparrow some 14.5 cm (5.7 in) long. The beak is broad and conical, with the upper mandible blackish and the lower mandible horn-coloured. The head has a grey crown with a lateral chestnut stripe that continues as far as the nape, a white superciliary stripe and a brown eyestripe. The upper parts are greyish-brown, shaded with buff, and boldly streaked with black. The wings are blackish-brown with pale edges to the feathers. The greater and median wing-coverts are blackish with chestnut edges and pale tips, and the lesser coverts are chestnut, resulting in a rather obscure barring to the wings. The angle of the wing is pale yellow. The tail is blackish-brown with pale edges to the feathers. The throat is white and the underparts are greyish-white. There is a dark moustachial stripe at the base of the beak. The song can mainly be heard in the breeding season, and consists of a repeated, clear metallic note, reiterated up to five times "chew-chew-chew-chew" interspersed with some trills.

== Distribution ==
This sparrow is endemic to the Tumbes Region of South America. Its range extends from the La Libertad Region of northwestern Peru to the Loja Province of southwestern Ecuador. Its altitudinal range is up to about 1,400 m (4,600 ft). Its typical habitat is dry scrub, open dry woodland, and semi-desert with cacti and bushes.

== Ecology ==
The species usually occurs singly or in pairs. It feeds on seeds and insects and usually forages on the ground. The nest is a cup-shaped structure made of grasses and lined with fine material in a concealed position among grasses on the ground. Breeding coincides with the rainy season and takes place from January to May.

== Status ==
R. stolzmanni is a fairly common species, and although it has a limited range, no particular threats have been recognised and the International Union for Conservation of Nature has rated its conservation status as being of "least concern".
