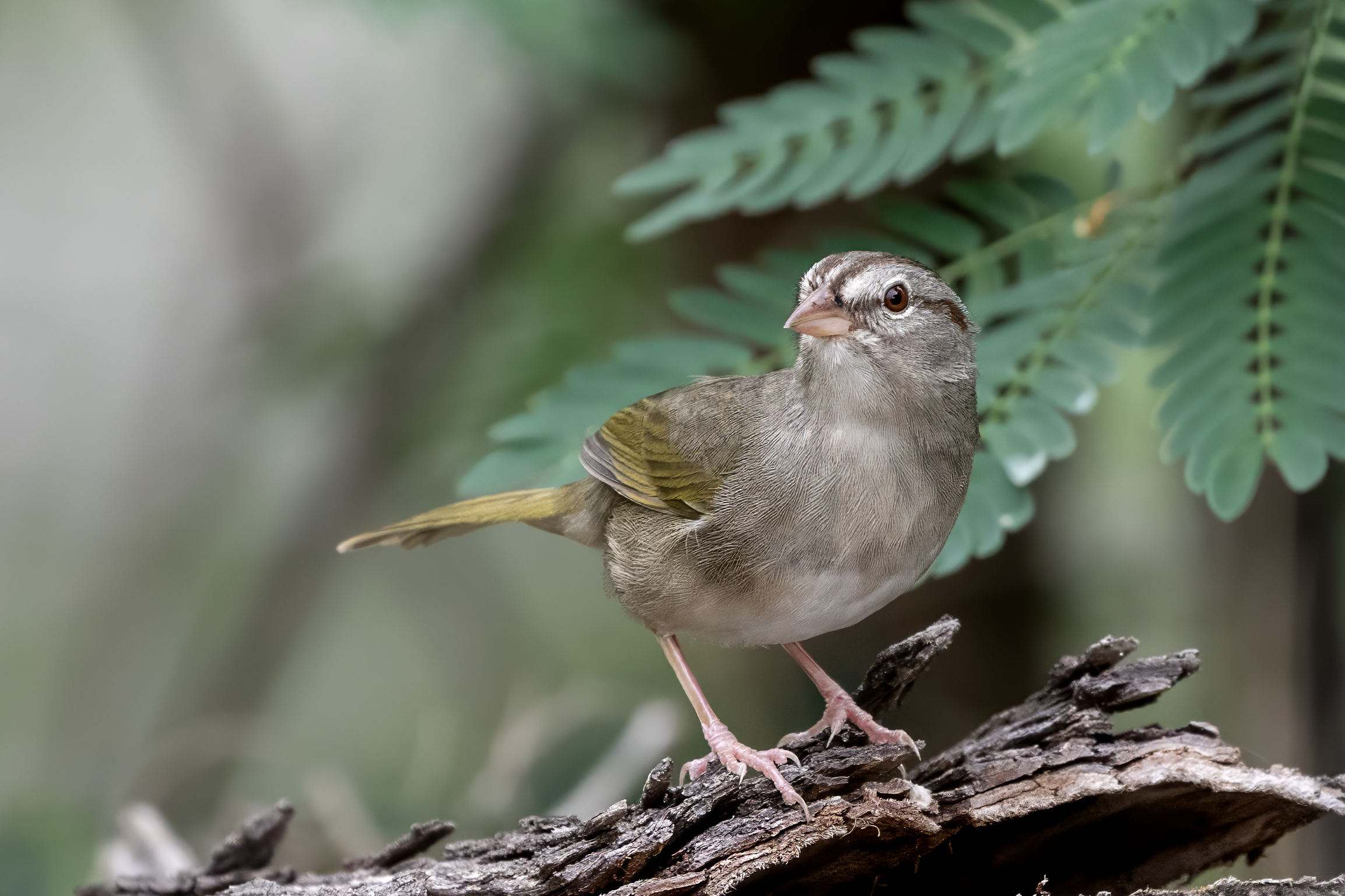
- An olive sparrow in Edinburg, Texas

Conservation status
- Least Concern (IUCN 3.1)

Scientific classification
- Kingdom: Animalia
- Phylum: Chordata
- Class: Aves
- Order: Passeriformes
- Family: Passerellidae
- Genus: Arremonops
- Species: A. rufivirgatus

Binomial name
- Arremonops rufivirgatus (Lawrence, 1851)

= Olive sparrow =

Species of bird

The olive sparrow (Arremonops rufivirgatus) is a species of bird in the family Passerellidae, the New World sparrows. It is found from Texas to Costa Rica.

== Taxonomy and systematics ==
The olive sparrow was formally described in 1851 with the binomial Embernagra rufivigata and the English name "brown striped olive finch". In 1896 Robert Ridgway erected the genus Arremonops and reassigned the olive sparrow to it as the type species.

The olive sparrow's further taxonomy is unsettled. The IOC and AviList assign it these eight subspecies:

- A. r. rufivirgatus (Lawrence, 1851)
- A. r. crassirostris (Ridgway, 1878)
- A. r. rhyptothorax Parkes, 1974
- A. r. verticalis (Ridgway, 1878)
- A. r. sinaloae Nelson, 1899
- A. r. sumichrasti (Sharpe, 1888)
- A. r. chiapensis Nelson, 1904
- A. r. superciliosus (Salvin, 1865)

However, as of late 2025 the Clements taxonomy and BirdLife International's Handbook of the Birds of the World add a ninth subspecies, A. r. ridgwayi (Sutton & Burleigh, 1941). The other systems include it within the nominate A. r. rufivirgatus.

This article follows the eight-subspecies model.

== Description ==
The olive sparrow is about 12 to 14 cm (4.7 to 5.5 in) long and weighs 15 to 30 g (0.53 to 1.1 oz). The sexes have the same plumage. Adults of the nominate subspecies have a brown crown with a wide olive gray stripe through its middle and down the nape. They have drab to olive brown lores, a wide buffy gray supercilium, and a thin brown line through the eye on an otherwise gray face. Their upperparts are uniformly olive. Their tail is brownish olive to olive with light yellowish outer edges on the feathers. Their wings' lesser coverts are mostly yellow with a few that are light fuscous with yellowish olive edges. Their primaries and secondaries are fuscous with buff inner edges and light yellowish olive outer edges. Their chin and throat are buffy white, their breast and belly white to buffy white, their sides and flanks buff, and undertail coverts cinnamon or creamy buff.

The other subspecies of the olive sparrow differ from the nominate and each other thus:

- A. r. crassirostris: darker and browner than nominate with dark olive-green upperparts and dark buffy olive flanks
- A. r. rhyptothorax: black-striped chestnut crown with gray center, light brownish olive back, whitish breast and belly, and ashy brown flanks
- A. r. verticalis: chestnut crown with gray center, brownish olive back, and olive-gray flanks
- A. r. sinaloae: chestnut crown with pale gray center, buff-gray ear coverts, grayish olive upperparts, and buffy gray flanks
- A. r. sumichrasti: similar to sinaloae with darker crown, buffier ear coverts, and greener (less gray) upperparts
- A. r. chiapensis: chestnut crown with dark gray center, darker green upperparts than sumichrasti
- A. r. superciliosus: dark chestnut crown with buffy gray center, grayish buff ear coverts, medium olive-green upperparts, and buffy gray flanks

All subspecies have a reddish brown to brownish red iris, a brownish pink bill with a darker base and tip, and pinkish to brownish pink legs and feet.

== Distribution and habitat ==
The olive sparrow has a highly disjunct distribution; several subspecies' ranges do not abut another's. The subspecies are found thus:

- A. r. rufivirgatus: southern Texas from a line between Val Verde and Calhoun counties south through eastern Mexico to northern Veracruz
- A. r. crassirostris: southeastern Mexico in Veracruz, eastern Puebla, and eastern Oaxaca
- A. r. rhyptothorax: northern edge of Mexico's Yucatán Peninsula
- A. r. verticalis: Yucatán Peninsula and south into northern Belize and extreme northeastern Guatemala
- A. r. sinaloae: northwestern Mexico from central Sinaloa south through Nayarit
- A. r. sumichrasti: southwestern Mexico from Jalisco to western Oaxaca
- A. r. chiapensis: central valley of southern Mexico's Chiapas and into western Guatemala
- A. r. superciliosus: Pacific slope from southwestern Nicaragua into northwestern Costa Rica to the Valle Central in San José Province

The olive sparrow inhabits a variety of landscapes across its wide range. In Texas it is found mostly in brushy open woodlands and open brushlands. In Mexico it occurs in chaparral, thorn forest, shrubby abandoned fields, the edges and clearings of subtropical forest, and the understory of tropical deciduous forest. On the Yucatán Peninsula it inhabits both humid forest and dry coastal scrublands. In Belize and Guatemala it is found mostly in semi-arid grasslands, savanna, and scrublands and to a lesser degree the edges of forest. In Costa Rica it is found on the edges and understory of forest and nearby secondary forest.

== Behavior ==
=== Movement ===
The olive sparrow is almost entirely a year-round resident. Some local movements to avoid cold weather have been noted and some individuals in Texas may be migratory.

=== Feeding ===
The olive sparrow's diet has not been studied but is known to include insects, spiders, seeds, and small amounts of fruit. It forages mostly singly and in loose pairs, hopping on the ground or low in dense vegetation. It will feed higher in trees but only rarely.

=== Breeding ===
The olive sparrow's breeding season varies geographically. It spans at least March to September in Texas but is concentrated in May-June and August-September. In southern Mexico it breeds between May and August and in Costa Rica between April and July. It appears that in many area pairs often raise two broods. Its nest is a large cylinder with a side entrance, made from twigs, grass, and straw with sometimes bark and leaves included. It is usually not lined. It is typically placed within about 1.5 m (5 ft) of the ground in a dense shrub, vine tangle, or clump of grass. Nests have also been found in prickly pear (Opuntia) and other succulents, under logs, and on the ground. The clutch size is two to five unmarked white to pale pink eggs. Probably only the female incubates the clutch. The incubation period, time to fledging, and other details of parental care are not known. Nests are parasitized by the bronzed cowbird (Molothrus aeneus) and brown-headed cowbird (M. ater).

=== Vocalization ===
Only the male olive sparrow is believed to sing. Its song is an "accelerating series of somewhat musical, downslurred tsip, chip, or tsew notes, usually dropping in pitch at the end of the series", and has been described "as sounding like a metallic ball bouncing on a concrete floor". Its calls include "a thin, high-pitched tsit or tsip", a "high-pitched drawn-out tssssir or srreeet", a "fast series of thin notes" (twitter), and a "sharp wheek wheek wheek wheek". There are some statistical differences among the eastern, western, and southern populations' songs. The species sings mostly before sunrise and at a much reduced rate during the day. It usually sings from a hidden perch but sometimes from an open perch or the ground.

== Status ==
The IUCN has assessed the olive sparrow as being of Least Concern. It has a very large range and its estimated population of 4.8 million mature individuals is believed to be stable. No immediate threats have been identified. It is considered common in Texas and Mexico. It is fairly common in Belize, rare in Guatemala, and common in Costa Rica. "Maintenance of existing thorn-scrub, thorn forest, and tropical deciduous forest, and restoration of suitable habitat on old agricultural fields, should benefit the Olive Sparrow."
