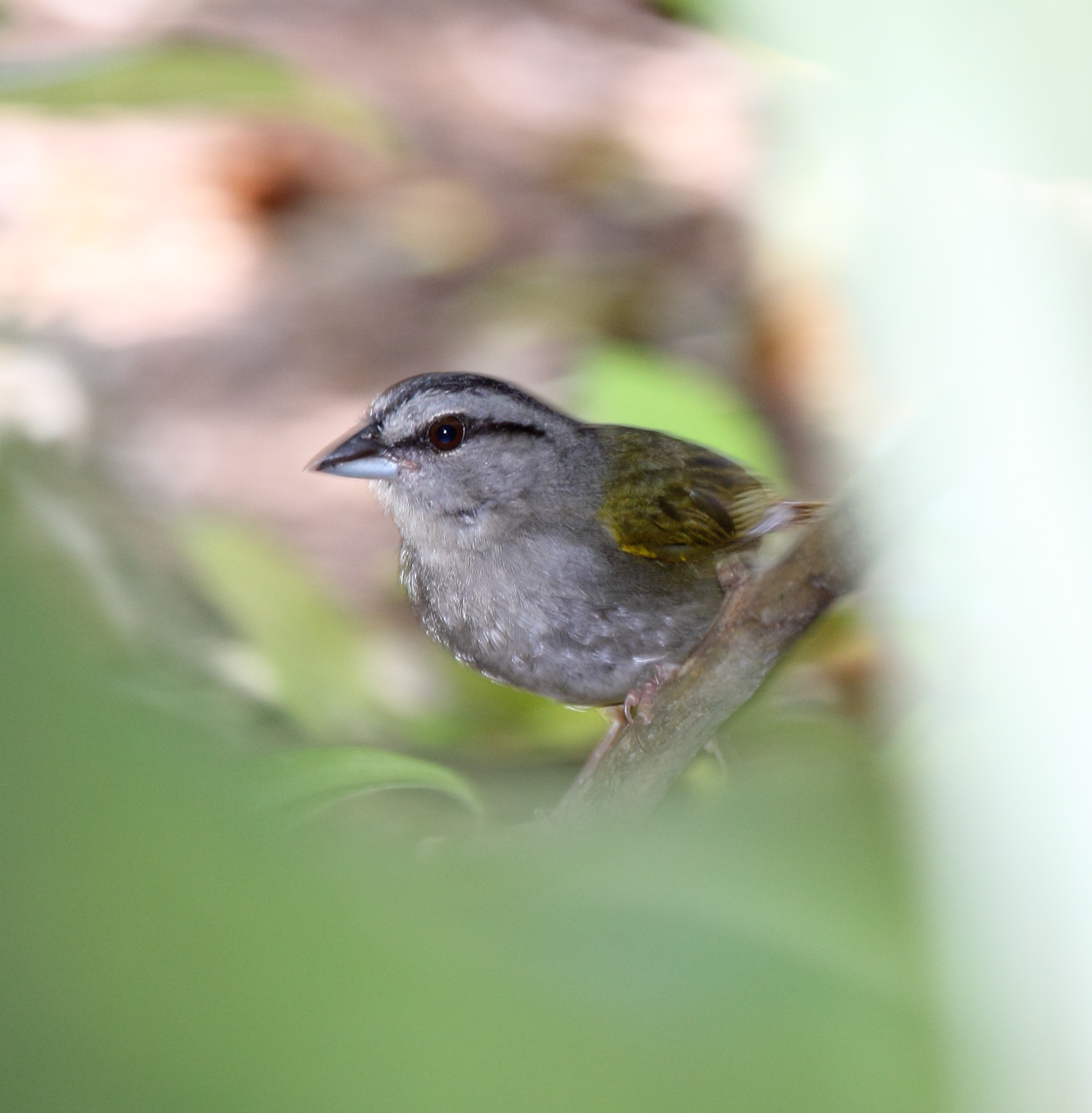

Conservation status
- Least Concern (IUCN 3.1)

Scientific classification
- Kingdom: Animalia
- Phylum: Chordata
- Class: Aves
- Order: Passeriformes
- Family: Passerellidae
- Genus: Arremonops
- Species: A. chloronotus

Binomial name
- Arremonops chloronotus (Salvin, 1861)

= Green-backed sparrow =

Species of bird

The green-backed sparrow (Arremonops chloronotus) is a species of bird in the family Passerellidae, the New World sparrows. It is found in Belize, Guatemala, Honduras, and Mexico.

== Taxonomy and systematics ==
The green-backed sparrow was formally described in 1861 with the binomial Embernagra chloronatus. Eventually it was reassigned to genus Arremonops that Robert Ridgway erected in 1896, and for much of the first half of the twentieth century it was treated as conspecific with A. conirostris, now called the black-striped sparrow.

The green-backed sparrow has two subspecies, the nominate A. c. chloronotus (Salvin, 1861) and A. c. twomeyi (Monroe, BL, 1963).

== Description ==
The green-backed sparrow is 15 to 16 cm (5.9 to 6.3 in) long and weighs 24 to 31 g (0.85 to 1.1 oz). The sexes have the same plumage. Adults of the nominate subspecies have a mostly slate gray head with wide black or brownish black strips on each side of the crown, a black or brownish spot in front of the eye, and a long black or brownish stripe behind the eye. Their upperparts, tail, and wings are bright olive green with canary yellow on the edge of the wings. Their chin and throat are dull white, their breast and sides grayish, their flanks pale olive green, their belly white, and their undertail coverts yellowish olive or olive yellowish. Subspecies A. c. twomeyi has a paler grayish white head than the nominate but with the same dark markings. Its upperparts are a brighter green and its breast and flanks are paler with a buff rather than gray wash. Juveniles have duller upperparts than adults with grayish underparts except for brighter green flanks and undertail coverts. Both subspecies have a brown iris, a black or brownish black maxilla, a blue-gray mandible, and pinkish legs and feet.

== Distribution and habitat ==
The nominate subspecies of the green-backed sparrow is the more northerly of the two and has a much larger range. It is found on the Caribbean slope of southeastern Mexico from Tabasco and northeastern Chiapas east across Campeche, southern Yucatán and Quintana Roo. From there its range continues south through Belize and northern Guatemala into northwestern Honduras. Subspecies A. c. twomeyi is found disjunctly in north-central Honduras in the Aguán River valley of Yoro Department and the valley of the Agalta and Catacamas rivers in Olancho Department.

In most of its range the green-backed sparrow inhabits the edges of tropical semi-deciduous and evergreen forest, savanna, and secondary forest. Subspecies A. c. twomeyi inhabits arid scrub and thorn forest. Sources differ on its upper elevation range. One states it is 900 m (3,000 ft) and two others say it is 750 m (2,500 ft).

== Behavior ==
=== Movement ===
The green-backed sparrow is a year-round resident.

=== Feeding ===
The green-backed sparrow's diet has not been studied but is assumed to include insects, seeds, berries, and soft fruit. It forages on the ground, usually singly or in pairs.

=== Breeding ===
The green-backed sparrow's breeding season has not been defined but spans at least May to July. Its nest is on the ground, a dome made from plant fibers, leaves, and bark with a side entrance. The clutch is two plain white eggs. The incubation period, time to fledging, and details of parental care are not known.

=== Vocalization ===
The subspecies of the green-backed sparrow have different songs. That of the nominate is "of even pace...with well-spaced song elements, sit-cheet-sueew-sueew-sueew-sueww-sueww or a slightly faster sueet!-wip-seet!-chew-chew-chew-chew-chew-chew-chew-chew-chew-chew-chew". That of subspecies A. c. twomeyi is "a longer series overall and slightly accelerating, psee-suet-suet-suet-suet-tip'tip'tip'tip'tip'tip'tip'tip". Both subspecies make a "soft, high-pitched tit or tip" call.

== Status ==
The IUCN has assessed the green-backed sparrow as being of Least Concern. It has a large range; its estimated population of at least 20,000 mature individuals is believed to be decreasing. No immediate threats have been identified. It is considered fairly common overall. It is fairly common to common in Belize and Guatemala and uncommon and local in Honduras.
