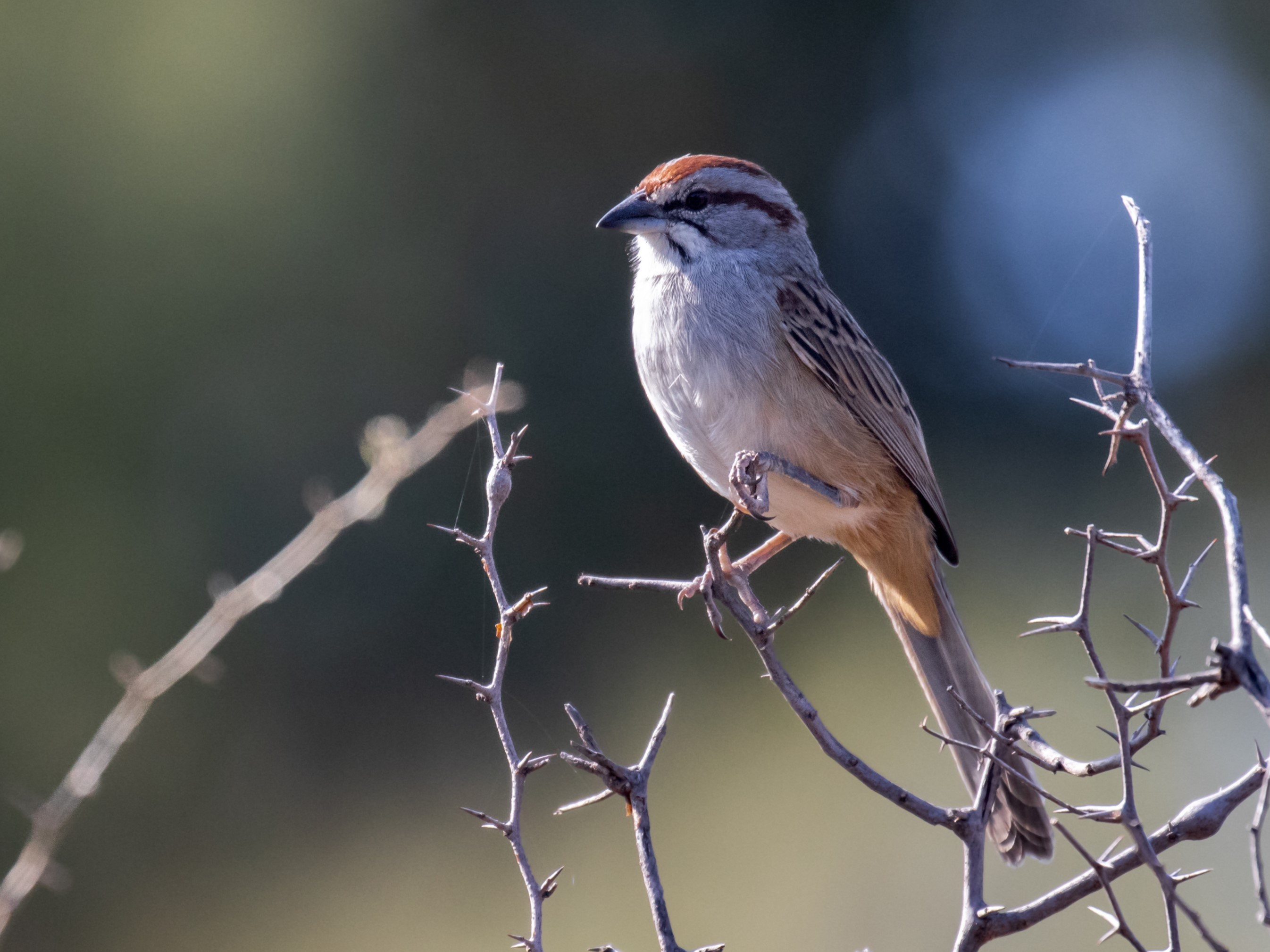

Conservation status
- Least Concern (IUCN 3.1)

Scientific classification
- Kingdom: Animalia
- Phylum: Chordata
- Class: Aves
- Order: Passeriformes
- Family: Passerellidae
- Genus: Rhynchospiza
- Species: R. strigiceps

Binomial name
- Rhynchospiza strigiceps (Gould, 1839)

Synonyms
- Aimophila strigiceps

= Chaco sparrow =

Species of bird

The Chaco sparrow (Rhynchospiza strigiceps), formerly known as the stripe-capped sparrow, is a species of bird in the family Passerellidae. It is found in Argentina and Paraguay.

== Taxonomy and systematics ==
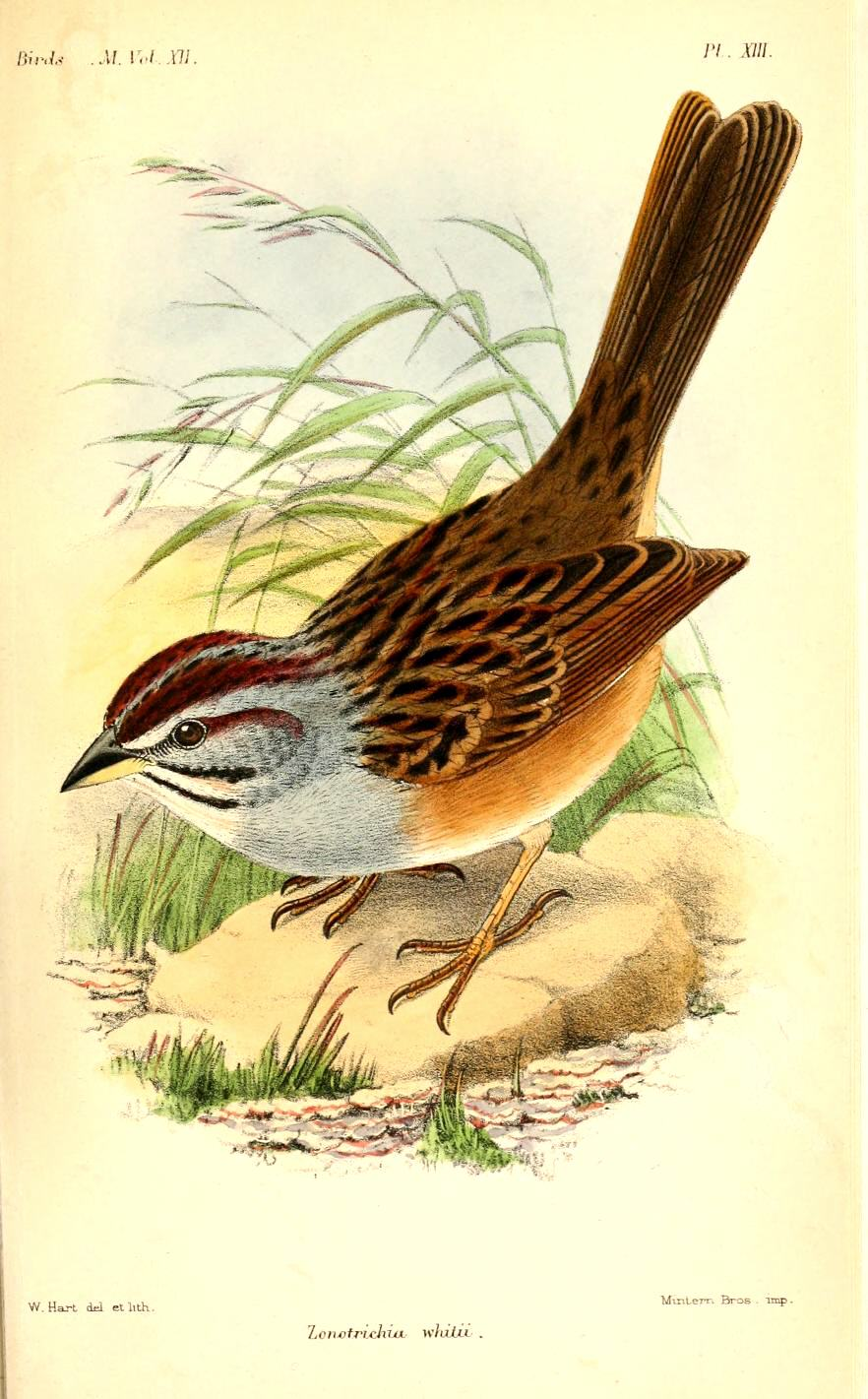

The current Chaco sparrow was originally one of two subspecies of the then stripe-capped sparrow (Aimophila strigiceps). A 2009 publication restored the genus Rhynchospiza and moved A. stolzmanii and A. strigiceps to that genus. A 2019 publication split Rhynchospiza dabbenei from R. strigiceps. Based on the 2019 publication, in June 2020 the South American Classification Committee (SACC) of the American Ornithological Society (AOS) split R. dabbenei as the Yungas sparrow and renamed R. strigiceps sensu stricto as the Chaco sparrow. The International Ornithological Congress (IOC) followed suit in January 2021.

== Description ==
The Chaco sparrow is the smaller of the two former subspecies that were split. Its upper parts are light brown with darker streaks and varying amounts of rust and gray. It is pale gray below blending to buff on the flanks. The head is gray with cinnamon crown and postocular stripes, pale lores, and a black moustachial stripe.

== Distribution and habitat ==
The Chaco sparrow is a partial migrant found in the Gran Chaco region from south-central Paraguay into north-central Argentina. This low elevation biome (up to 1,000 m (3,300 ft)) is characterized by subtropical and tropical dry forests and shrubland.

== Vocalization ==
The Chaco sparrow's song is complex trills that contrast with the Yungas sparrow's series of chirps.

== Status ==
The IUCN has evaluated the Chaco sparrow sensu lato as of Least Concern.
