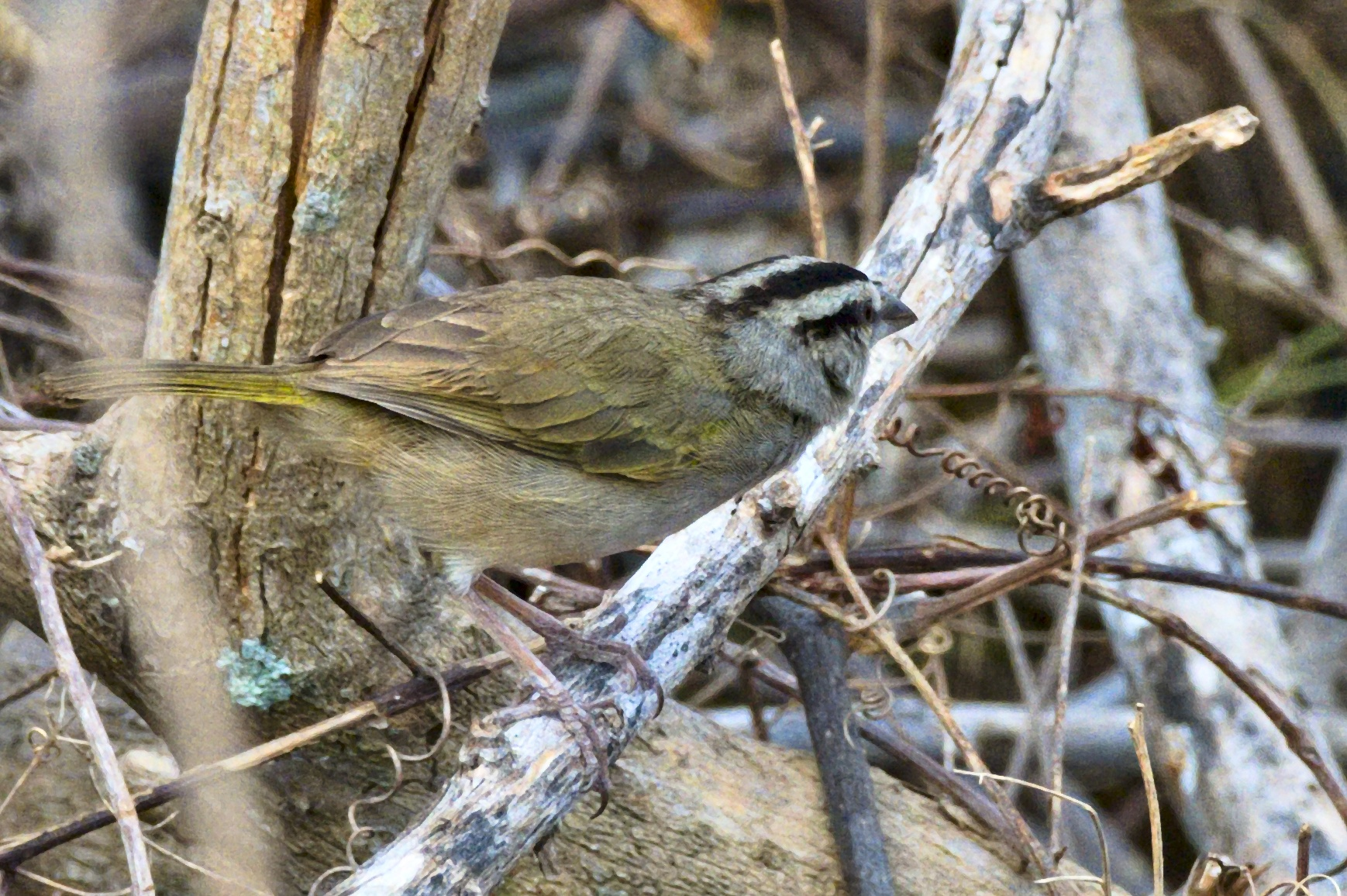

Conservation status
- Least Concern (IUCN 3.1)

Scientific classification
- Kingdom: Animalia
- Phylum: Chordata
- Class: Aves
- Order: Passeriformes
- Family: Passerellidae
- Genus: Arremonops
- Species: A. tocuyensis

Binomial name
- Arremonops tocuyensis Todd, 1912

= Tocuyo sparrow =

Species of bird

The Tocuyo sparrow (Arremonops tocuyensis) is a species of bird in the family Passerellidae, the New World sparrows. It is found in Colombia and Venezuela.

== Taxonomy and systematics ==
The Tocuyo sparrow was formally described in 1912 with its current binomial Arremonops tocuyensis. The species' English name and specific epithet derive from El Tocuyo, a city and valley in Venezuela's Lara state, where the type specimen was collected.

The Tocuyo sparrow is monotypic.

== Description ==
The Tocuyo sparrow is 13 to 14 cm (5.1 to 5.5 in) long. The sexes have the same plumage. Adults have wide black stripes on each side of the crown that meet on the nape and a whitish stripe between them, a wide pale gray supercilium, a blackish line from the lores through the eye, and medium gray ear coverts. Their upperparts are plain olive. Their tail is dusky with dull olive-green feather edges. Their wings are dusky with a strong olive-green wash and with yellow at the bend of the wing. Their throat and underparts are mostly white with a smoke-gray tinge on the breast and buffy cream flanks and undertail coverts. They have a brownish iris, a blackish maxilla, a leaden blue mandible, and dark pinkish legs and feet. Juveniles are mostly olive-yellow with darker streaks. They have a yellowish supercilium but no black stripes on the head.

== Distribution and habitat ==
The Tocuyo sparrow is found on northeastern Colombia's Guajira Peninsula and slightly into adjoining northern Zulia state in northwestern Venezuela. Its range continues intermittently east and south in northern Venezuela with concentrations in Falcón and at the northern end of the Andes in Lara. It inhabits a variety of dry to moist low-stature landscapes including thorn forest and shrublands and brushy areas adjoining dry and deciduous forest. In Colombia it ranges in elevation from sea level to 300 m (1,000 ft) and in Venezuela to 1,100 m (3,600 ft) though most records there are much lower.

== Behavior ==
=== Movement ===
The Tocuyo sparrow is a year-round resident.

=== Feeding ===
The Tocuyo sparrow's diet has not been studied. It is known to forage mostly singly and in pairs, on the ground and in low vegetation.

=== Breeding ===
The Tocuyo sparrow's breeding season has not been determined. Its nest is on the ground or low in a bush, an enclosed ball with a side entrance made from leaves, twigs, and rootlets lined with finer fibers. The clutch is two or three white eggs. The incubation period, time to fledging, and details of parental care are not known.

=== Vocalization ===
The Tocuyo sparrow's song is somewhat variable but usually has three parts. Examples are "a short, sweet tit, tit'ti'ti'ti 'tsuee tsuee or sweeu, sweeu, eeee, tu'tu'tu'tu...or tsuee, tsuee, tzEE, tu-tu-tu". It usually sings at dawn and from a hidden perch. Its call is "a high-pitched tiip".

== Status ==
The IUCN has assessed the Tocuyo sparrow as being of Least Concern. It has a limited range; its population size is not known and is believed to be decreasing. No immediate threats have been identified. It is considered "locally fairly common" in Colombia and "uncommon and local" in Venezuela.
