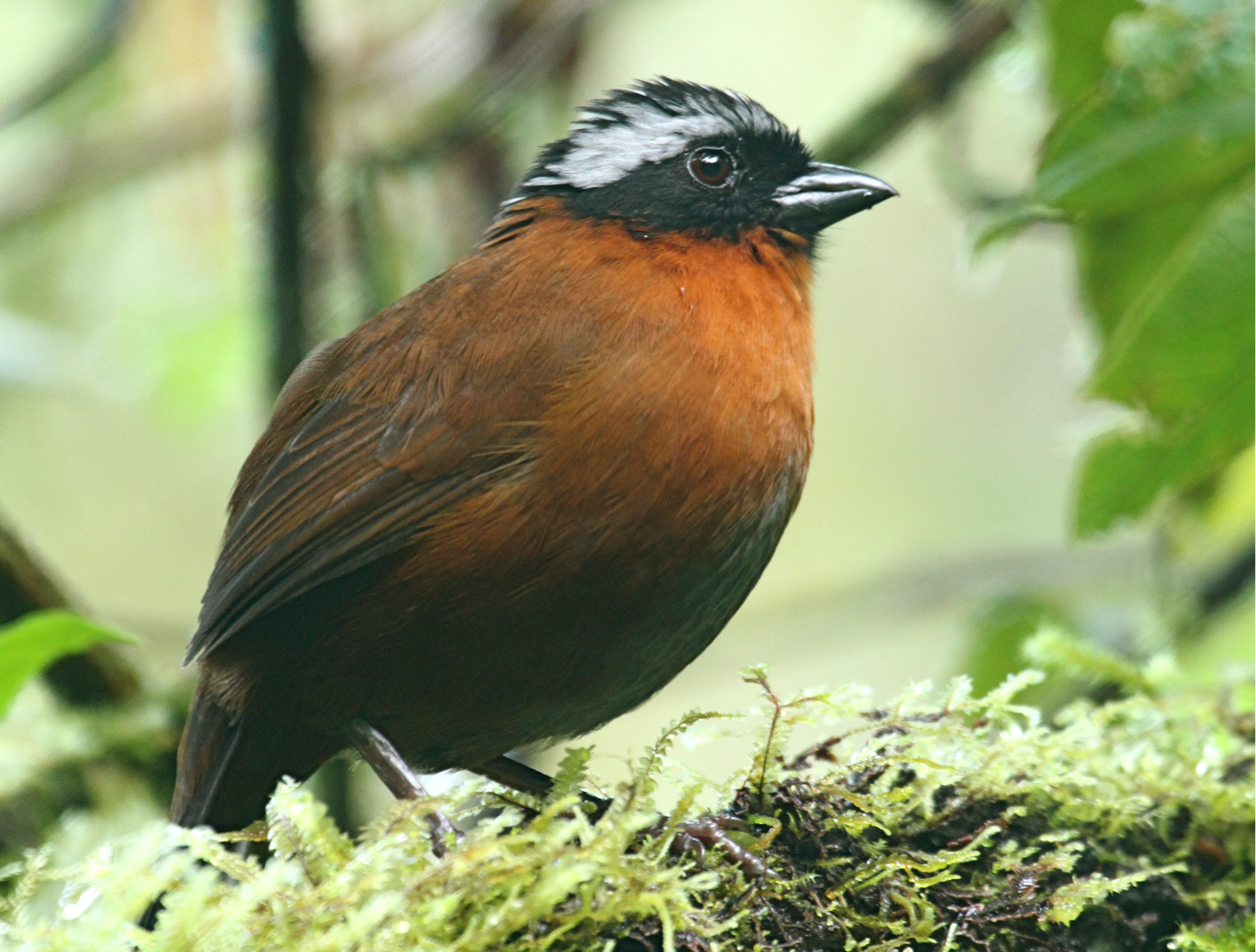
- In Ecuador

Conservation status
- Least Concern (IUCN 3.1)

Scientific classification
- Kingdom: Animalia
- Phylum: Chordata
- Class: Aves
- Order: Passeriformes
- Family: Passerellidae
- Genus: Oreothraupis; Sclater, PL, 1856
- Species: O. arremonops

Binomial name
- Oreothraupis arremonops (Sclater, PL, 1855)

Synonyms
- Saltator arremonops

= Tanager finch =

Species of bird

The tanager finch (Oreothraupis arremonops) is a songbird species. In spite of its common name, it is neither a tanager nor a finch, but a New World sparrow, having been moved to that family after variously being placed in either the Emberizidae or the true tanager family Thraupidae. It is the only species in the monotypic genus Oreothraupis. It is found in Colombia and Ecuador, where its natural habitat is subtropical or tropical moist montane forests. It is threatened by habitat loss.

== Appearance ==
This bird is commonly around 20-30 cm. It is a small and bulky bird with a short, black beak. It has a black head with a white colored strip running towards its back. Tanager finches have a white stomach, which contrasts its rust or light orange body color, and dark brown legs. It has a proportional tail, which is a rust color that is slightly darker than its body. The male and female species of this bird look the same.

== Foraging ==
The tanager finch can be found foraging in moist undergrowth, beneath low shrubs, and in leaf litter of mossy forests. They frequently scavenge in pairs or family groups, on or just above the ground. They have been seen scratching at litter leaves on the forest floor.

== Habitat and Ecology ==
The tanager finch is found in Colombia and Ecuador. They inhabit thick undergrowth in dense, wet, and mossy cloud-forest. Their population has been experiencing continuous decline due to the decrease in the size and quality of their habitat. They are residents of the subtropical/tropical moist forest and do not migrate. They belong to the terrestrial system and their generation length is 3.8 years.

== Sounds ==
The tanager finch's song is high pitched. It typically begins with three to five congested notes and then continues into a stilting chatter. It has been described as sounding like "tzz tzz tzzz tz-zz-zz-tz tz tz tz tz tz". The song gets stronger up to the very end. It also gets longer and more complex as it goes on.

== Conservation status ==
The population of the tanager finch was reported as decreasing in 2018. The number of mature tanager finches ranges from six thousand to one thousand five hundred. There are no conservation actions in place, other than conservation sites within their habitat range. They are currently considered not globally threatened, although they were previously vulnerable.

=== Threats ===
The tanager finch has many threats to its well being. The most common threats being from deforestation and urbanization. These threats include residential and commercial development, transportation corridors, and wood harvesting. Agriculture and aquaculture also present threats to the Tanager Finch. This is due to annual and perennial non-timber crops, plantations, and livestock farming.

== Breeding ==
Tanager finch nests are usually egg shaped and made of moss. There has been one nest description published and it described a nest, one meter above the ground, having a roof made of moss. There was one white colored egg.
