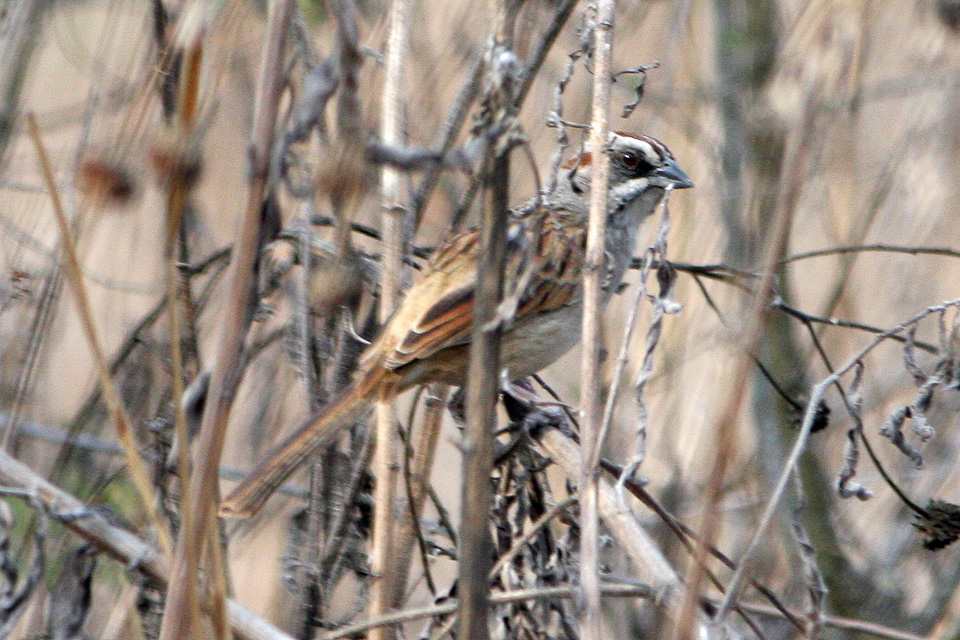
- Yungas sparrow (Rhynchospiza dabbenei)

Scientific classification
- Kingdom: Animalia
- Phylum: Chordata
- Class: Aves
- Order: Passeriformes
- Family: Passerellidae
- Genus: Rhynchospiza; Ridgway, 1898

Type species
- Haemophila stolzmanni Taczanowski, 1877

Species
- Rhynchospiza dabbenei Rhynchospiza stolzmanni Rhynchospiza strigiceps

= Rhynchospiza =

Genus of birds

Rhynchospiza is a genus of American sparrows. It was formerly included in Aimophila, but recent molecular studies show these two to three species to merit their own genus. All species are distributed in South America.

== Species in taxonomic order ==
Genus Rhynchospiza – Ridgway, 1898 – three species
Common name	Scientific name and subspecies	Range	Size and ecology	IUCN status and estimated population
Tumbes sparrow	Rhynchospiza stolzmanni (Taczanowski, 1877)	Ecuador and Peru	Size: Habitat: Diet:	LC
Yungas sparrow	Rhynchospiza dabbenei (Hellmayr, 1912)	Argentina	Size: Habitat: Diet:	LC
Chaco sparrow	Rhynchospiza strigiceps (Gould, 1839)	Gran Chaco region from south-central Paraguay into north-central Argentina	Size: Habitat: Diet:	LC
