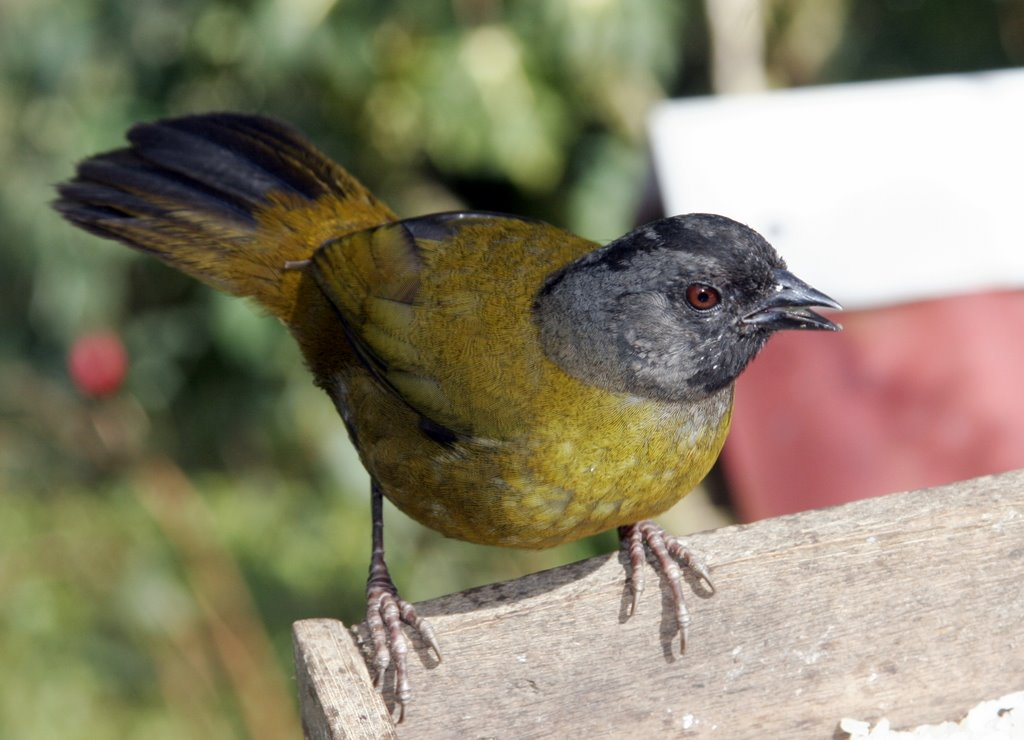
- In Costa Rica

Conservation status
- Least Concern (IUCN 3.1)

Scientific classification
- Kingdom: Animalia
- Phylum: Chordata
- Class: Aves
- Order: Passeriformes
- Family: Passerellidae
- Genus: Pezopetes; Cabanis, 1861
- Species: P. capitalis

Binomial name
- Pezopetes capitalis Cabanis, 1861

= Large-footed finch =

Species of bird

The large-footed finch (Pezopetes capitalis) is a species of bird that despite its name is in the family Passerellidae, the New World sparrows. It is found in Costa Rica and Panama.

== Taxonomy and systematics ==
The large-footed finch was formally described by Jean Cabanis in 1861 with its current binomial Pezopetes capitalis. Cabanis erected the genus Pezopetes for this species and placed it in the finch family Fringillidae.

The large-footed finch eventually was reassigned to its current sparrow family. It remains the only member of the genus and has no subspecies.

== Description ==
The large-footed finch is one of the heaviest in its diverse family. It is 17 to 20 cm (6.7 to 7.9 in) long and weighs about 56 g (2.0 oz). It has a long tail and very large legs and feet but a disproportionately small slender bill. The sexes have the same plumage. Adults have a black crown and a dark gray supercilium. Their face from the bill to just past the eye and down through the throat is black and the rest of their face and their nape are dark gray. Their upperparts and wing coverts are olive green. Their tail is blackish with thin olive green feather edges. Their flight feathers are dusky with wide olive green edges. Their underparts are mostly a paler olive green than the upperparts and more yellowish in the center of the breast and belly. Both sexes have a reddish or mouse-brown iris, a black bill, and black or brownish legs and feet. Immature birds have olive green rather than gray on the head and their underparts have heavy black streaks.

== Distribution and habitat ==
The large-footed finch has a somewhat disjunct distribution. It has a few small ranges in the northern part of Costa Rica's Cordillera Central and a large continuous one from Costa Rica's western Cartago and northeastern San José provinces south through the Cordillera Central and Cordillera de Talamanca into western Panama's Bocas del Toro and Chiriquí provinces. It primarily inhabits the edges and understory of montane evergreen forest and secondary forest where it favors areas with bamboo, and also in brushy openings and pastures. In Costa Rica it also is found in paramo. Its overall range in elevation is stated to be between 2,150 and 3,350 m (7,100 and 11,000 ft). In Costa Rica it is found "from 2,000 m (6,600 ft) to above timberline". It occurs locally down to 1,500 m (4,900 ft) in Panama.

== Behavior ==
=== Movement ===
The large-footed finch is a year-round resident.

=== Feeding ===
The large-footed finch's diet has not been detailed but is known to include seeds, insects, and fruits. It hops on the ground while foraging, stopping to scratch leaf litter with both feet together; the backward kicks can send debris up to 30 cm (12 in) away. It typically is in pairs year-round and is not known to join mixed-species feeding flocks.

=== Breeding ===
The large-footed finch breeds between March and June with activity concentrated in March and April. One member of the pair, assumed to be the female, constructs the nest, a large loose cup of coarse plant material lined with finer fibers. It is typically placed in a shrub or bamboo about 0.3 to 2.5 m (1 to 8 ft) above the ground. The usual clutch is one egg though some have two. The eggs are light blue with darker mottling. The incubation period, time to fledging, and details of parental care are not known.

=== Vocalization ===
The large-footed finch's song is described as "a languid medley of sweet whistles and chirps" likened to that of some wrens. Another description compares the song to that of the orange-billed nightingale-thrush (Catharus aurantiirostris), writing it as "short, rich, throaty whistles" and "rattles, trills and imitations of other birds". The species' call is "a high, soft psee or seet".

== Status ==
The IUCN has assessed the large-footed finch as being of Least Concern. It has a large range; its estimated population of at least 20,000 mature individuals is believed to be stable. No immediate threats have been identified. It is considered "fairly common" in Costa Rica. "Human activity has not been documented to affect populations of Large-footed Finch."
