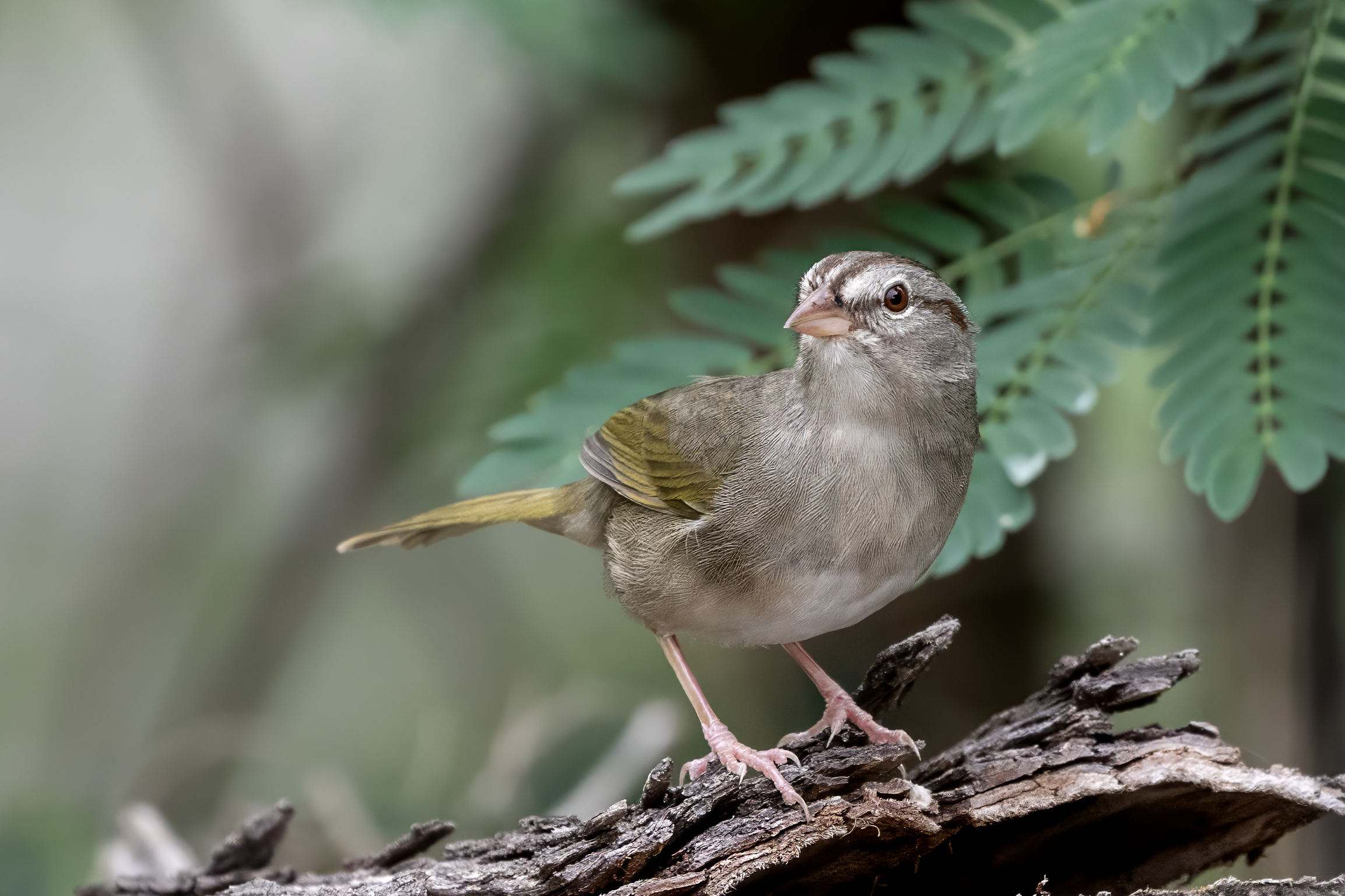
- Olive sparrow (Arremonops rufivirgatus)

Scientific classification
- Kingdom: Animalia
- Phylum: Chordata
- Class: Aves
- Order: Passeriformes
- Family: Passerellidae
- Genus: Arremonops; Ridgway, 1896

Type species
- Embernagra rufivirgata Lawrence, 1851

= Arremonops =

Genus of birds

Arremonops is a genus of Neotropical birds in the family Passerellidae. All species are found in Central America, Mexico, and/or northern South America. The olive sparrow reaches southern Texas.

== Species ==
It contains the following four species:

Genus Arremonops – Ridgway, 1896 – four species
Common name	Scientific name and subspecies	Range	Size and ecology	IUCN status and estimated population
Green-backed sparrow	Arremonops chloronotus (Salvin, 1861)	Map of range	Size: Habitat: Diet:	LC
Olive sparrow	Arremonops rufivirgatus (Lawrence, 1851)	Map of range	Size: Habitat: Diet:	LC
Tocuyo sparrow	Arremonops tocuyensis Todd, 1912	Map of range	Size: Habitat: Diet:	LC
Black-striped sparrow	Arremonops conirostris (Bonaparte, 1850)	Map of range	Size: Habitat: Diet:	LC

== See also ==
- Sparrow
