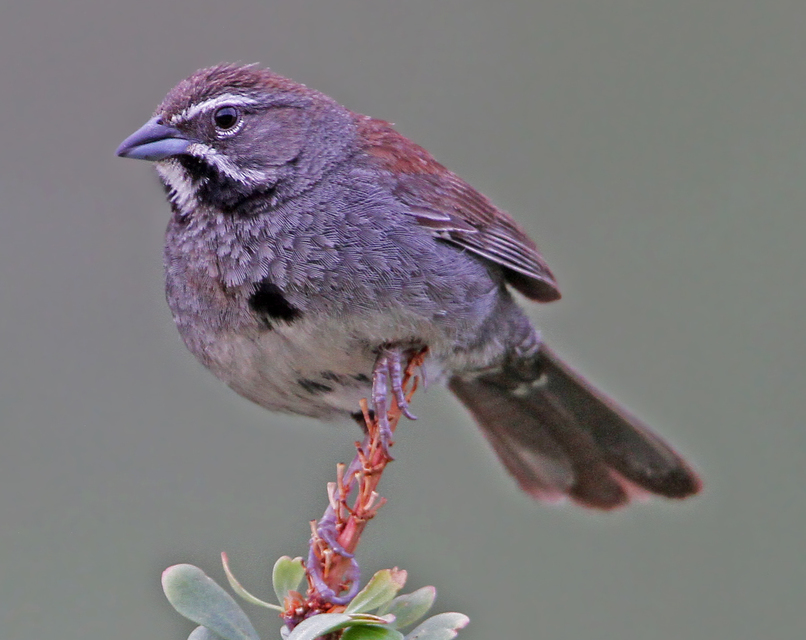

Conservation status
- Least Concern (IUCN 3.1)

- Apparently Secure (NatureServe)

Scientific classification
- Kingdom: Animalia
- Phylum: Chordata
- Class: Aves
- Order: Passeriformes
- Family: Passerellidae
- Genus: Amphispizopsis; Wolters, 1980
- Species: A. quinquestriata

Binomial name
- Amphispizopsis quinquestriata (Sclater, PL & Salvin, 1868)

Synonyms
- See text

= Five-striped sparrow =

Species of bird

The five-striped sparrow (Amphispizopsis quinquestriata) is a medium-sized species of bird in the family Passerellidae, the New World sparrows. It is found in the U. S. state of Arizona and in Mexico.

== Taxonomy and systematics ==
The five-striped sparrow has a complicated taxonomic history. It was formally described in 1868 with the binomial Zonotrichia quinquestriata. It was later reassigned to genus Amphispiza and by 1934 was reassigned to genus Aimophila. In 2010 it was returned to Amphispiza and shared that genus with the black-throated sparrow (A. bilineata). In 2021 a new genus Amphispizopsis was erected for it and most taxonomic systems recognize it as the only species in that genus. However, as of late 2025 BirdLife International's Handbook of the Birds of the World retains it in Amphispiza.

The five-striped sparrow has two subspecies, the nominate A. q. quinquestriata (Sclater, PL & Salvin, 1868) and A. q. septentrionalis (Van Rossem, 1934).

== Description ==
The five-striped sparrow is about 15 cm (5.9 in) long and weighs about 20 g (0.71 oz). The sexes have the same plumage. Adults of the nominate subspecies have a mostly grayish head with a purple tinge. They have a purplish gray-brown crown. Their English name and specific epithet derive from their white supercilia, a white stripe under their ear coverts, and a white stripe down the middle of their chin and throat. The white stripes are separated by black stripes. Their upperparts and tail are mostly grayish brown with a chestnut to rufous brown upper back and a purplish tinge on the lower back, rump, and tail. Their wings are mostly brown with some rufous feather edges. Their breast and flanks are slate-gray with a round black patch in the middle of the breast. Their belly is white and their undertail coverts gray with wide white edges. Subspecies A. q. septentrionalis is similar to the nominate but paler and has a larger spot on the breast. Both subspecies have a dark brown iris, a black maxilla, a bluish mandible, and light brown to brownish legs and feet.

== Distribution and habitat ==
The five-striped sparrow has a disjunct distribution primarily in Mexico's Sierra Madre Occidental. The nominate subspecies is the more northerly of the two and has by far the larger range. It is found from Pima and Santa Cruz counties in south-central Arizona south into northwestern Mexico to central Sinaloa and western Durango. It was first documented in Arizona in 1957 and has regularly bred there since 1974. Subspecies A. q. septentrionalis is found further south in western Mexico's southern Zacatecas and northern Jalisco.

In Arizona the five-striped sparrow inhabits rocky hillsides and canyon walls with dense low scrubby vegetation. In Mexico it inhabits the same landscapes and also steep hillsides in tropical deciduous forest and some flatter areas.

== Behavior ==
=== Movement ===
The five-striped sparrow is a year-round resident throughout its range. However, some individuals in Arizona and far northern Mexico apparently move south after the breeding season though some remain there in winter.

=== Feeding ===
The five-striped sparrow feeds primarily on moth and butterfly caterpillars and also includes significant numbers of adults, other insects, and seeds in its diet. In the breeding season it forages singly and in pairs; in winter it sometimes forms flocks of up to 40 individuals. It forages on the ground and in low vegetation, pecking for food but not scratching in leaf litter. It rarely takes insects in mid-air.

=== Breeding ===
The five-striped sparrow breeds mostly between July and September though some activity precedes July. It sometimes raises two broods in a season. The female builds the nest, a deep cup made from grass lined with finer grass and often some animal hair. It typically is hidden in a clump of grass on the ground or near the ground in a shrub. The clutch is three to four plain white eggs. The incubation period is 12 to 13 days and the female alone incubates. Fledging occurs nine to ten days after hatch and both parents provision nestlings. Some nests are parasitized by brown-headed cowbirds (Molothrus ater).

=== Vocalization ===
Only the male five-striped sparrow sings; its song is "stacatto, unmelodious, and brief, usually composed of an introductory note and most often 2 (range 1–7) note complexes". It sings throughout the day and usually from a perch. Both sexes make calls which include "chuck, pip, and seet" notes that may be single or in series.

== Status ==
The IUCN has assessed the five-striped sparrow as being of Least Concern. It has a large range; its estimated population of 200,000 mature individuals is believed to be decreasing. No immediate threats have been identified. NatureServe calls it "apparently secure" in Arizona. However, the species is considered "rare and local" there.
