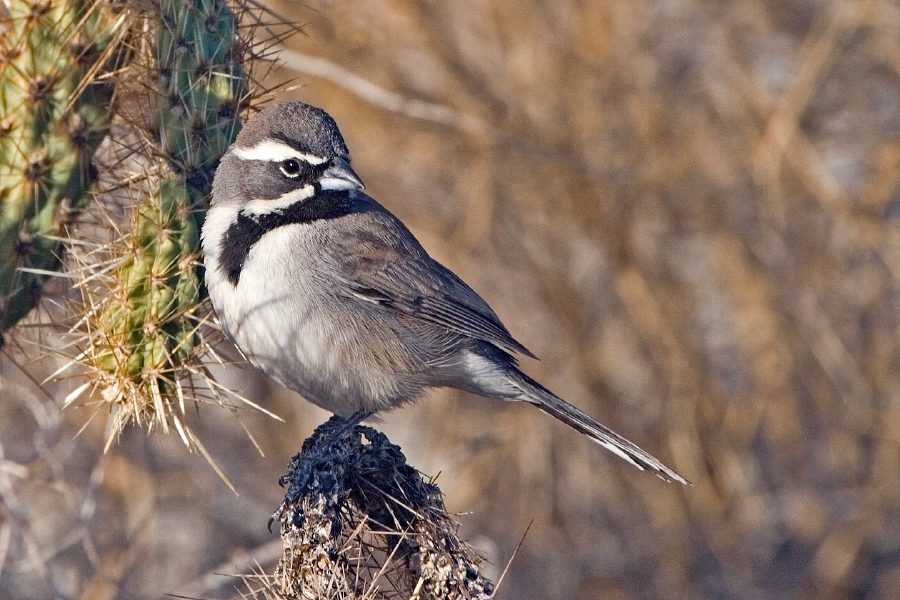

Conservation status
- Least Concern (IUCN 3.1)

Scientific classification
- Kingdom: Animalia
- Phylum: Chordata
- Class: Aves
- Order: Passeriformes
- Family: Passerellidae
- Genus: Amphispiza; Coues, 1874
- Species: A. bilineata

Binomial name
- Amphispiza bilineata (Cassin, 1850)
- Range of A. bilineata Breeding range Year-round range

= Black-throated sparrow =

Species of bird

The black-throated sparrow (Amphispiza bilineata) is a species of bird in the family Passerellidae, the New World sparrows. It is found in Mexico and the United States.

== Taxonomy and systematics ==
The black-throated sparrow was formally described in 1850 with the binomial Emberiza bilineata. Elliott Coues erected the new genus Amphispiza in 1874 with the black-throated sparrow as the type species.

Several other species including the five-striped sparrow (Amphispizopsis quinquestriata) and what are now Bell's sparrow (Artemisiospiza belli) and the sagebrush sparrow (Artemisiospiza nevadensis) were previously also assigned to Amphispiza. These reassignments left the black-throated sparrow as the only member of the genus. They were adopted by the American Ornithological Society (AOS), the IOC, the Clements taxonomy, and AviList. However, as of late 2025 BirdLife International's Handbook of the Birds of the World (HBW) retains the five-striped sparrow in Amphispiza with the black-throated.

The black-throated sparrow's further taxonomy is unresolved. The IOC, AviList, and HBW assign it these nine subspecies:

- A. b. bilineata (Cassin, 1850)
- A. b. opuntia Burleigh & Lowery, 1939
- A. b. deserticola Ridgway, 1898
- A. b. bangsi Grinnell, 1927
- A. b. tortugae Van Rossem, 1930
- A. b. belvederei Banks, 1963
- A. b. pacifica Nelson, 1900
- A. b. cana Van Rossem, 1930
- A. b. grisea Nelson, 1898

The Clements taxonomy adds a tenth subspecies, A. b. carmenae (Van Rossem, 1945), that the other systems include in A. b. belvederei.

This article follows the nine-subspecies model with a few notes about A. b. pacifica included.

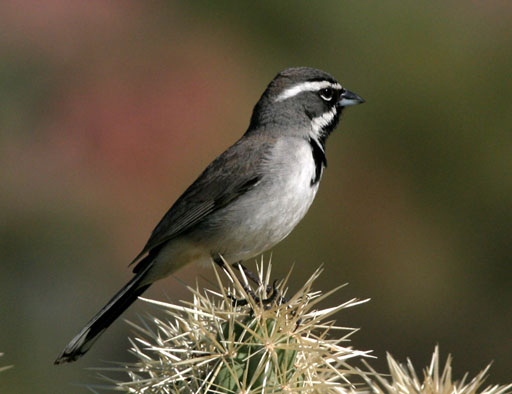
A. b. deserticola at Lost Dutchman State Park, Arizona

== Description ==
The black-throated sparrow is about 12 to 14 cm (4.7 to 5.5 in) long, weighs 11 to 15 g (0.39 to 0.53 oz), and has a wingspan of about 19.5 cm (7.7 in). The sexes have the same plumage. Adults of the nominate subspecies A. b. bilineata have a black forehead, a gray crown and nape, a white supercilium and malar stripe both with thin black borders, black lores, and dark slate ear coverts. Their back and scapulars are brownish gray and their uppertail coverts mouse gray. Their tail is mostly brownish black. The innermost pair of feathers are fuscous and the outermost pair have white edges on the outer webs and a white spot near the end of the inner webs. Their wing's greater and median coverts and their tertials are dark olive-brown with buff edges. Their primaries and secondaries are brown and light fuscous with varying amounts of white on their edges. Their chin, throat, and center of their upper breast are black. The rest of their underparts are white with a plumbeous tinge on the sides and flanks.

The other subspecies of the black-throated sparrow differ from the nominate and each other thus:

- A. b. opuntia: grayish mantle, small white tips on outer tail feathers, whitish underparts
- A. b. deserticola: grayish brown mantle, small white tips on outer tail feathers, whitish underparts
- A. b. bangsi: like deserticola but grayer and darker mantle and larger white tail feather tips
- A. b. tortugae: slate gray mantle and grayish underparts
- A. b. belvederei: like tortugae but darker gray mantle
- A. b. pacifica: like deserticola but darker
- A. b. cana: like deserticola but grayer and with larger white tail feather tips
- A. b. grisea: like nominate but darker overall, a grayer mantle, and smaller white tail feather tips

All subspecies have a dark grayish brown iris, a dark maxilla, a bluish gray mandible, and black or brownish plumbeous legs and feet.

== Distribution and habitat ==
The subspecies of the black-throated sparrow are found thus:

- A. b. bilineata: from north-central Texas south into northeastern Mexican states of Coahuila, Nuevo León, Tamaulipas
- A. b. opuntia: from southeastern Colorado and far western Oklahoma south through eastern New Mexico and western Texas into northern Chihuahua and northwestern Coahuila in north-central Mexico
- A. b. deserticola: eastern Washington, south-central and southeastern Oregon, and from southwestern Idaho south through Colorado, far western Oklahoma, Arizona, New Mexico, western Texas, and eastern California south into the northern half of Baja California and to central Sonora in Mexico
- A. b. bangsi: southern half of Baja California (approximately Baja California Sur) and islands in the Sea of Cortez except Tortuga, Cerralvo, Carmen, and San Esteban
- A. b. tortugae: Tortuga Island
- A. b. belvederei: Cerralvo and Carmen islands
- A. b. pacifica: Mexico from southern Sonora south to northern Sinaloa including Tiburón and San Pedro Nolasco islands
- A. b. cana: San Esteban Island
- A. b. grisea: Mexico from central Chihuahua east to southwestern Tamaulipas and south to northern Jalisco east to Hidalgo

Within A. b. belvederei, "A. b. carmenae" is found on Carmen Island.

The species has also occurred outside its nominal range as far north as British Columbia, Alberta, and Saskatchewan in western Canada and all the way to the Atlantic in multiple sites from Florida to New Jersey and north into Ontario and Quebec.

The black-throated sparrow primarily inhabits a variety of dry to arid semi-open landscapes with well-spaced shrubs and smallish trees such as mesquite and juniper. These include scrublands, thorn bush, alluvial fans, canyons, and badlands. It also occasionally occurs in grassy and weedy fields during migration and in winter.

== Behavior ==
=== Movement ===
The three northernmost subspecies of the black-throated sparrow (A. b. bilineata, A. b. opuntia, and A. b. deserticola) are partial migrants. They all leave the northern parts of their ranges after the breeding season and move to the southern parts of their ranges and beyond. They are present year-round in southeastern California, southern Arizona, southern New Mexico, Texas, and Mexico. Within those last areas, some subpopulations move to lower elevations in winter. The other six subspecies are year-round residents.

=== Feeding ===
Most of the information on the black-throated sparrow's diet comes from the United States. There during the breeding season it feeds mainly on insects with significant amounts of seeds and other plant material. In winter it feeds almost entirely on seeds. It forages mostly while hopping on the ground but also gleans prey from low vegetation. In the breeding season it forages singly, in pairs, and in family groups; in winter it forms larger flocks that may include other sparrow species.

=== Breeding ===
The black-throated sparrow's breeding season varies latitudinally but for most populations falls within March to July. In southern Arizona and New Mexico many raise a second brood during the summer rains of July to early September. On islands in the Sea of Cortez it breeds in late September through October. The female builds the nest, an open cup made from a wide variety of plant fibers lined with fine fibers and sometimes also animal hair. It is usually built near the ground in a branch fork in a dense shrub of a wide variety of species. However, nest success appears to be lower when mesquite is used than some other substrates. Clutches range from two to five eggs but are typically of three or four. The eggs are plain glossy bluish white to white. The female alone incubates, for 12 to 13 days in Arizona and New Mexico. Some nests are parasitized by brown-headed cowbirds (Molothrus ater). Fledging occurs about 10 days after hatch. The female broods nestlings and both parents provision them.

=== Vocalization ===
The black-throated sparrow's song usually has two parts, an "(1) introduction with note(s) followed by buzz and (2) repetitive section of trills (and sometimes buzzes)". One rendering is "chee-whee, whit, wher'r'r'r, cha, cha, cha, or chee cha cher'r'r'r'r chee". It apparently has few calls.

== Status ==
The IUCN has assessed the black-throated sparrow as being of Least Concern. It has an extremely large range; its estimated population of 62 million mature individuals is believed to be decreasing. No immediate threats have been identified. In the U. S. it is considered "widespread and common" in proper habitat. "Loss of habitat may threaten some populations on the lower Colorado River bottomlands where large tracts of mesquite woodlands have been cleared for agriculture and residential developments...Long-term fire suppression throughout the South-west alters plant succession, allowing shrub communities to become thicker and taller, reducing habitat for Black throated Sparrows which prefer semiopen areas of evenly spaced, 1- to 3-m-high shrubs or trees."
