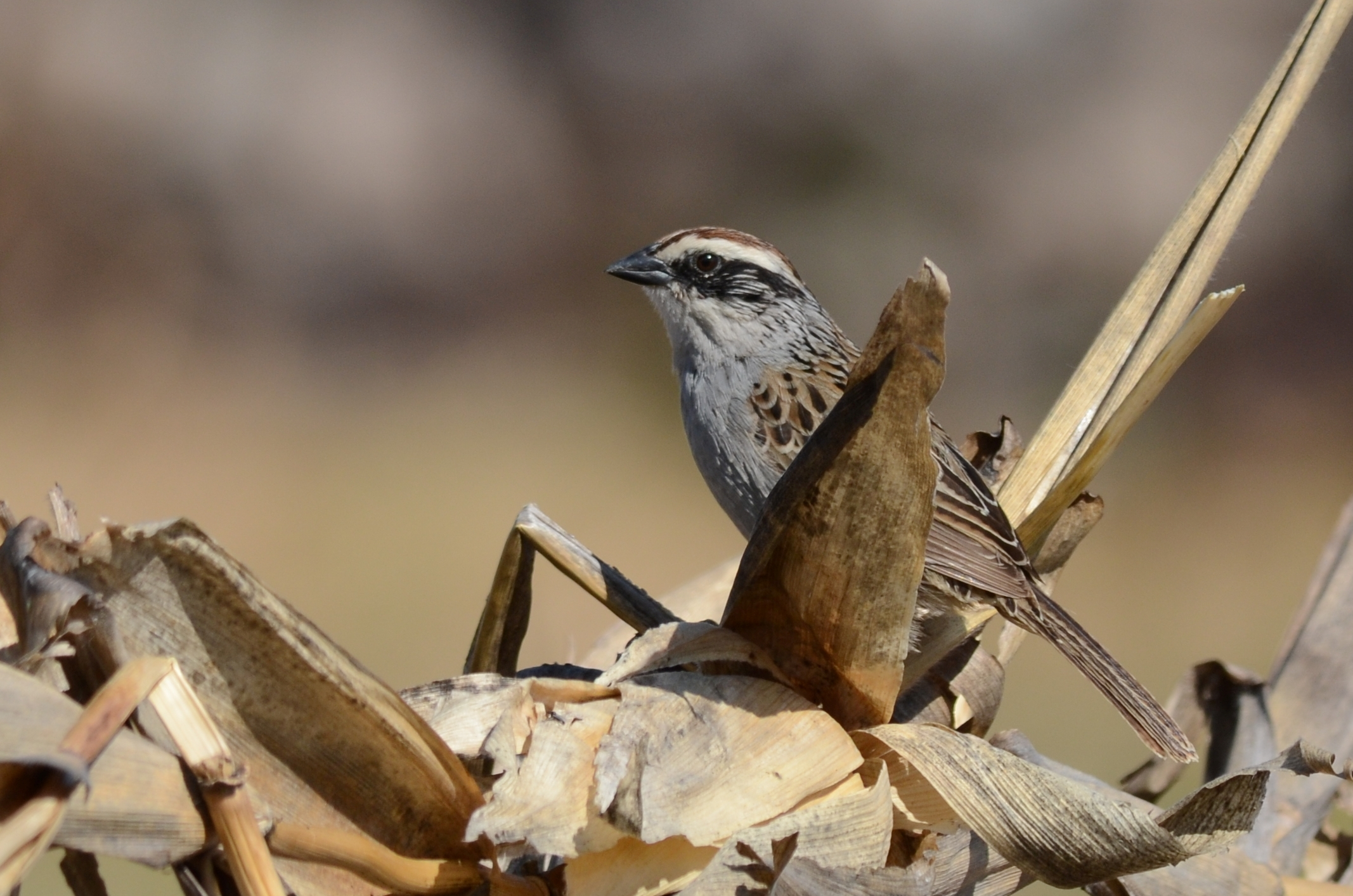

Conservation status
- Least Concern (IUCN 3.1)

Scientific classification
- Kingdom: Animalia
- Phylum: Chordata
- Class: Aves
- Order: Passeriformes
- Family: Passerellidae
- Genus: Oriturus; Bonaparte, 1850
- Species: O. superciliosus

Binomial name
- Oriturus superciliosus (Swainson, 1838)

= Striped sparrow =

Species of bird

The striped sparrow (Oriturus superciliosus) is a species of bird in the family Passerellidae, the New World sparrows. It is endemic to Mexico.

== Taxonomy and systematics ==
The striped sparrow was formally described in 1838 with the binomial Aimophila superciliosa. In 1850 Charles Lucien Bonaparte erected the genus Oriturus and in 1856 assigned Aimophila superciliosa to it.

The striped sparrow is the only member of its genus. It has two subspecies, the nominate O. s. superciliosus (Swainson, 1838) and O. s. palliatus (Van Rossem, 1938).

== Description ==
The striped sparrow is 16.5 to 18 cm (6.5 to 7.1 in) long and weighs 37 to 54 g (1.3 to 1.9 oz). Males are larger than females but the sexes have the same plumage. Adults have a rufous crown with thin black streaks and a thin gray stripe along its middle. They have blackish lores and ear coverts that form a "mask" and a long wide white supercilium. Their nape and the sides of their neck are light grayish with black streaks. Their mantle, scapulars, and back are buffy brown with heavy black and pale gray streaks. Their long rounded tail is dark brown with buff-brown feather edges. Their wing's lesser coverts are warm brown with pale gray edges and the primary coverts blackish with wide pale buff edges. The median and greater coverts are blackish with whitish tips that form two faint wing bars when folded. Their flight feathers are blackish with thin grayish white edges on the primaries, thin buff-brown edges on the secondaries, and thin buff-brown edges that are white at the tips on the tertials. Their underparts are mostly pale grayish white that is lightest on the throat and center of the belly. Their flanks and undertail coverts have a buffy wash. Subspecies O. s. palliatus has paler and redder upperparts than the nominate, gray central tail feathers, a whitish throat and middle of the belly, and a light gray vent area. Both sexes of both subspecies have a brownish iris, a black bill, and pale brown or pinkish legs and feet.

== Distribution and habitat ==
The striped sparrow is primarily a bird of the Mexican Sierra Madre Occidental and Trans-Mexican Volcanic Belt. It also occurs in the southern Sierra Madre Oriental, the Balsas River watershed, and the Sierra Madre del Sur. Subspecies O. s. palliatus is the more northerly of the two. It is found from eastern Sonora and southwestern Chihuahua south to Nayarit and western Zacatecas. The nominate is found from palliatus' southern limit south to Michoacán, Morelos, and Puebla. It also has a small separate range in central Oaxaca that is not shown on the map.

The striped sparrow primarily inhabits montane grasslands with scattered shrubs, pine forest, and pine-oak forest in the upper subtropical and temperate zones. Sources differ about its elevational range. A twentieth century one places it between 2,100 and 3,300 m (6,900 and 10,800 ft). A 2006 field guide states the range as 1,500 and 3,500 m (4,900 and 11,500 ft). A 2024 source agrees with the field guide and adds that it "may occur as high as 4,300 m (14,100 ft)".

== Behavior ==
=== Movement ===
The striped sparrow is believed to be a sedentary year-round resident, primarily because of habitat restrictions.

=== Feeding ===
The striped sparrow's diet has not been studied. However, it is known to feed primarily on seeds, especially those of grasses, and to add invertebrates during the breeding season. It feeds on the ground or above it in clumps of grass. On the ground it scratches through soil and leaves to expose food. It typically forages in pairs or small groups during the breeding season and during winter joins flocks with other sparrows.

=== Breeding ===
The striped sparrow's breeding season has not been defined but is thought to span May to September. Its nest is a cup made from twigs, grass, pine needles, and other coarse plant material and lined with finer fibers. It is typically placed near the ground in a dense bush or a clump of bunchgrass. The usual clutch is three or four eggs that are white with irregular dark spots of any of several colors. The female alone incubates, for 13 to 14 days. The time to fledging and other details of parental care are not known.

=== Vocalization ===
One description of the striped sparrow's primary song is an "ultra high rattle tit-tjtjtjtjtj...". It also has a seldom-heard flight song that is similar. One call is a "very high-pitched...sharp tink note" given in series, and in alarm it makes "a fast series of chattering notes".

== Status ==
The IUCN has assessed the striped sparrow as being of Least Concern. It has a large range; its estimated population of at least 50,000 mature individuals is believed to be decreasing. No immediate threats have been identified. "Because it is adapted to a specific graminoid ground cover associated with mountain forests, it is classified as a species restricted by habitat. In addition, its sedentary behavior limits its dispersal capabilities."
