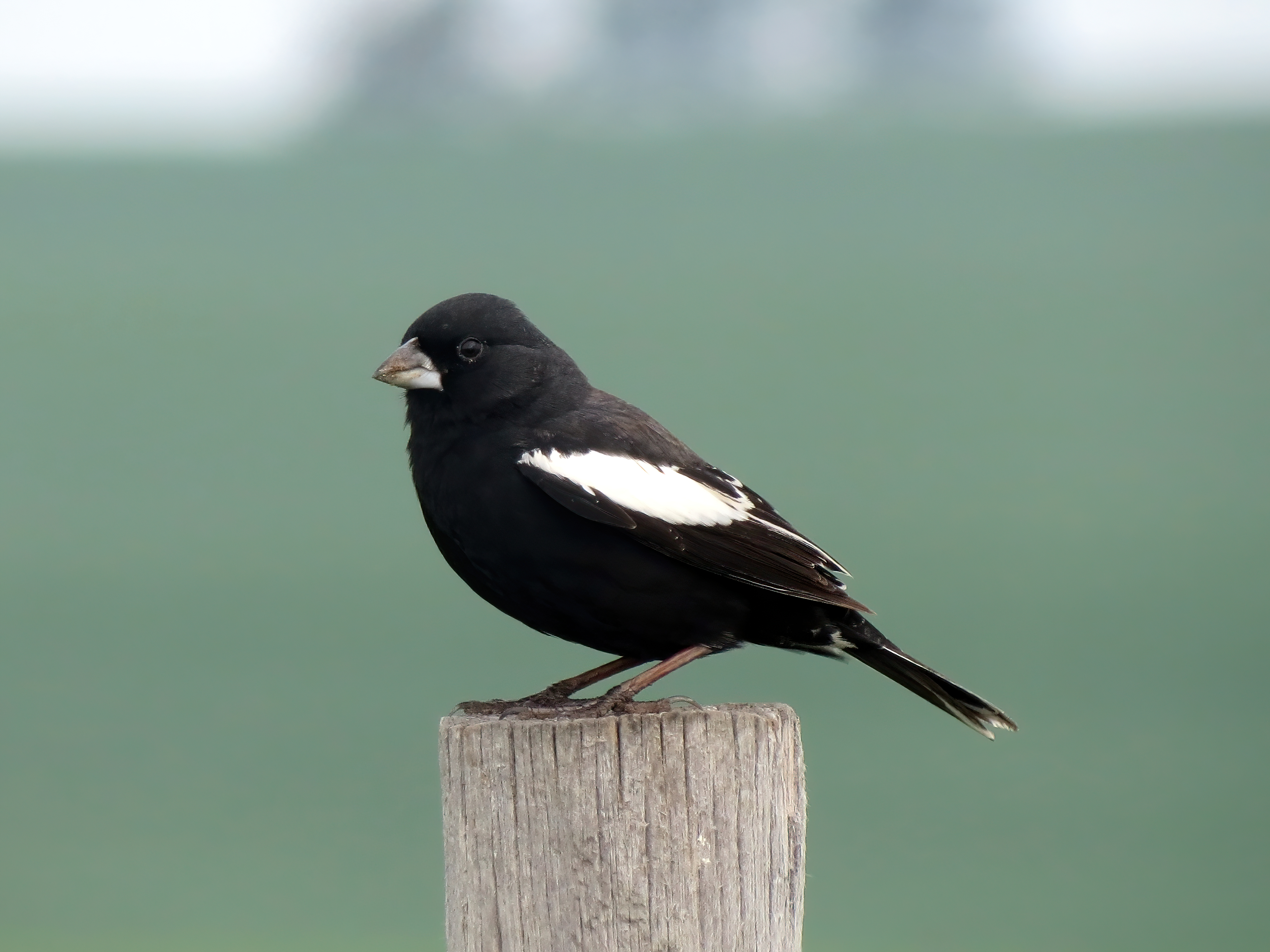
- Male lark bunting
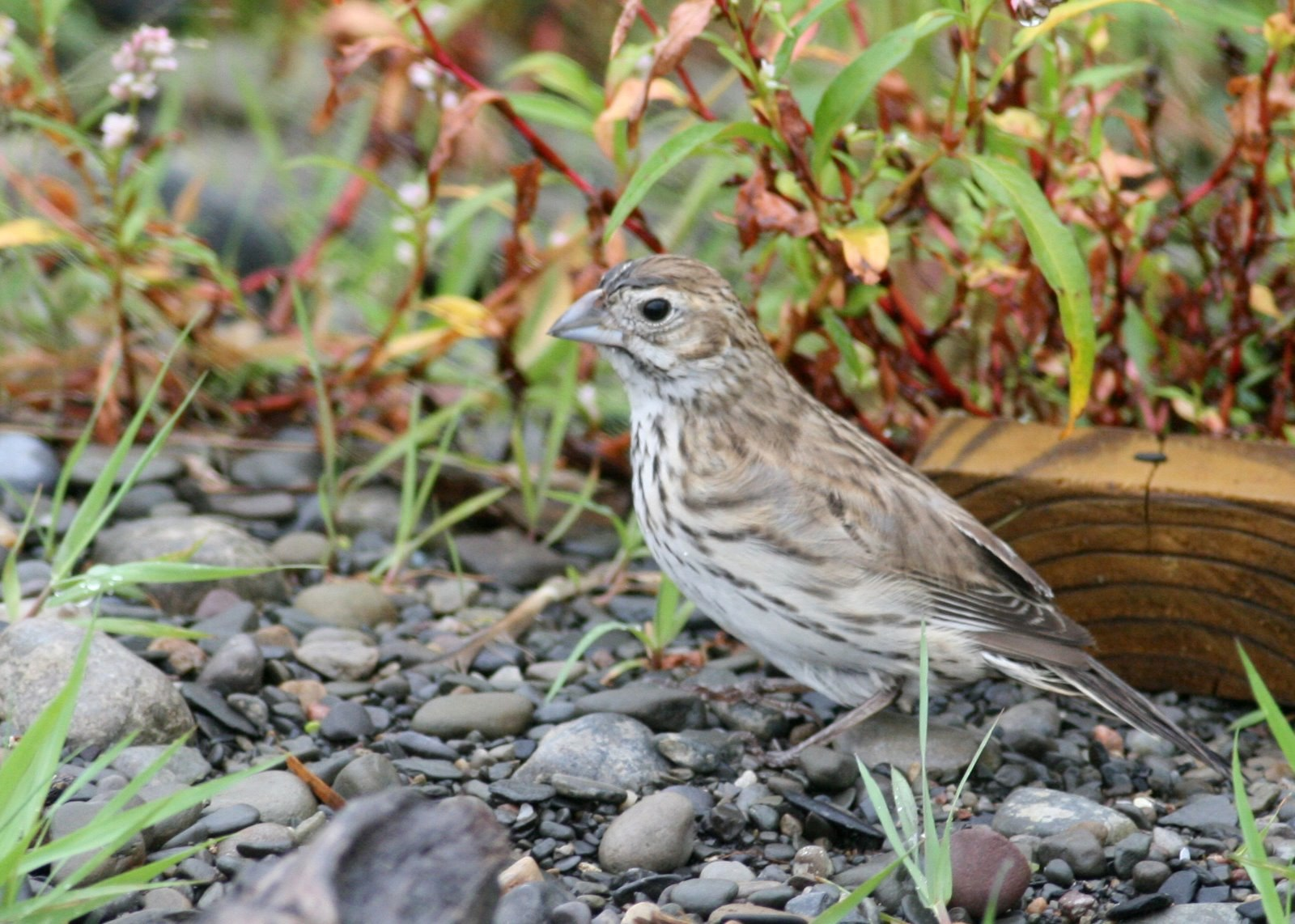
- Female lark bunting

Conservation status
- Least Concern (IUCN 3.1)

Scientific classification
- Kingdom: Animalia
- Phylum: Chordata
- Class: Aves
- Order: Passeriformes
- Family: Passerellidae
- Genus: Calamospiza; Bonaparte, 1838
- Species: C. melanocorys

Binomial name
- Calamospiza melanocorys Stejneger, 1885

Synonyms
- Fringilla bicolor J. K. Townsend, 1837

= Lark bunting =

Species of bird

The lark bunting (Calamospiza melanocorys) is a medium-sized American bunting native to central and western North America. It was designated the state bird of Colorado in 1931.

== Taxonomy ==
The lark bunting is monotypic, the only member of the genus Calamospiza, and is not closely related to any other genera. It was first described by J. K. Townsend in 1837, from a specimen collected on a trip he took with Thomas Nuttall, under the name Fringilla bicolor. This is a preoccupied name, so Leonhard Hess Stejneger renamed the species in 1885 Calamospiza melanocorys. By then, the lark bunting had already been given its own genus, the one it is still placed in, by Charles Lucien Bonaparte in 1838.

== Description ==
Lark buntings are small songbirds, with a short, thick, bluish bill. There is a large patch of white on the wings and they have a relatively short tail with white tips at the end of the feathers. Breeding males have an all black body with a large white patch on the upper part of the wing. Nonbreeding males and females look similar and are grayish brown with white stripes.

Measurements:

- Length: 5.5–7.1 in (140–180 mm)
- Weight: 1.3–1.5 oz (37–43 g)
- Wingspan: 9.8–11.0 in (250–280 mm)

== Distribution and habitat ==
The lark bunting is the most prevalent of the passerine species found in the grasslands of North America. Their breeding habitat is prairie regions in central Canada and the mid-western United States. These birds migrate in flocks to winter southern Texas, Arizona and the high plateau of northern Mexico in the fall.

== Behavior ==
=== Breeding ===
The birds typically nest in dispersed colonies. Males fly up over their territory and sing while descending to declare ownership of a nesting territory. The song consists of a mix of whistles and trills. The call is a soft hoo.

The nest is an open cup on the ground in a grassy area.

While the lark buntings are socially monogamous, there is extensive extra-pair mating, observed through extra-pair paternity. In songbirds, it is suggested that social monogamy exists because of limited opportunities for polygyny. As expected, there is considerable aggression between males and between females, competing for mates. Many males are unable to find a social mate, which can be attributed to male-biased breeding sex ratio, social monogamy, and the frequency of extra-pair paternity. Acquisition of a social mate is an essential element of a male's fitness, thus social mating success plays a significant role in variable selection of male traits.

Sexual selection in lark buntings is particularly interesting, as female mate choice is radically different from year to year. In different years, females show preference based on males' black coloring, size of wing patch, size of beak, as well as other characteristics. The consequence of this extreme variation of female choice from year to year is the maintenance of genetic variation in several different male sexual ornaments. A study measures body color, proportion of black versus brown feathers on rump and rest of body, wing patch size, wing patch color, body size, beak size, and residual mass, in order to evaluate the multiple characteristics potentially selected on by females. Social pairing success was measured as well as total annual fitness, finding female choice as the primary factor. Plasticity in female choice is favored for adapting to changes in ecological and social environments.

Temporal flexibility in female choice parallels the phenomenon seen in Darwin's finches, with different beak sizes and shapes favored for changing food supply over years, defined as temporal selection in the context of natural selection. In lark buntings, a trait that is positively selected upon one year was likely negatively selected against in a previous year. These dramatic fluctuations highlight the importance of looking at sexual selection patterns over an extended period of time before drawing any conclusions. By looking at short time periods, however, it possible to identify female preference annually, however it is difficult to make any extrapolations for these assessments. An additional consequence of variation of female choice annually is the potential elimination of phenotypic selection for male trait exaggeration.

Males are characterized as weakly territorial prior to mating, however, there has been some evidence on territory features correlating with female settlement, thus female reproductive success. Studies have shown that shade is an important resource for female reproductive success. As a fitness-limiting feature, it would be reasonable to expect this could account for any existing tendencies for males being territorial. However, levels of male aggression do not change, which lends to the conclusion that female choice corresponds with changes in fitness-indicator traits. Extra-pair mating has been corresponded with nesting site quality, adding further characterization to male aggression. Many studies have shown territory characteristics being important for mate acquisition; however, a recent study shows evidence of its decreased role in comparison to female choice.

=== Feeding ===
Lark buntings primarily forage on the ground, mainly eating insects in summer and seeds in winter; they sometimes take short flights in pursuit of insects. Outside of the nesting season, they often feed in flocks.

== State bird ==
The lark bunting has been the state bird of Colorado since 1931.

== Status ==
There has been a decrease in population with the loss of natural prairie habitat.
