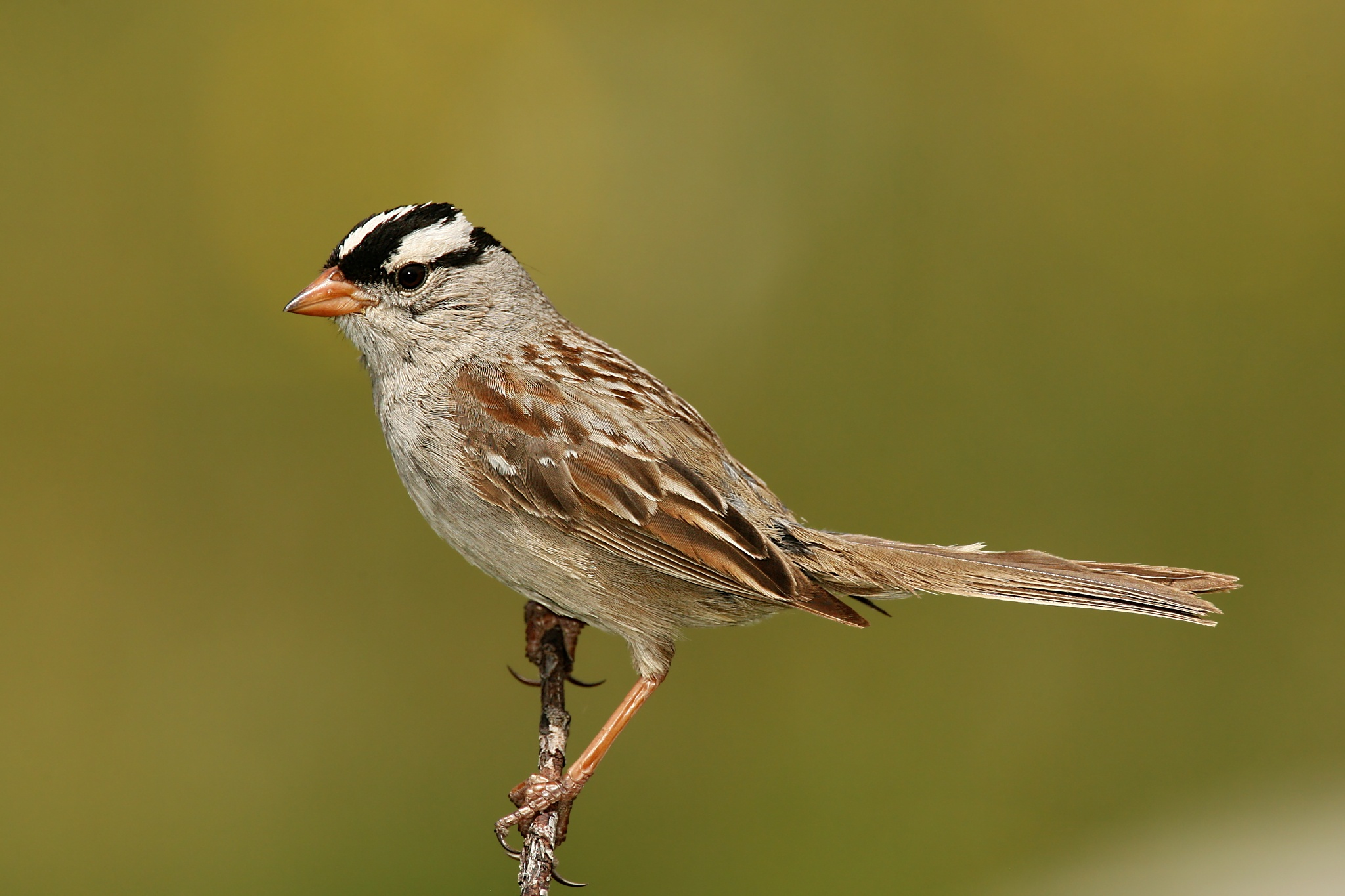
- White-crowned sparrow Zonotrichia leucophrys

Scientific classification
- Kingdom: Animalia
- Phylum: Chordata
- Class: Aves
- Order: Passeriformes
- Superfamily: Emberizoidea
- Family: Passerellidae; Cabanis, 1851

Genera
- See text

= New World sparrow =

Family of birds

New World sparrows are a group of mainly New World passerine birds, forming the family Passerellidae. They are seed-eating birds with conical bills, brown or gray in color, and many species have distinctive head patterns.

Although they share the name sparrow, New World sparrows are more closely related to Old World buntings than they are to the Old World sparrows (family Passeridae). New World sparrows are also similar in both appearance and habit to finches, with which they sometimes used to be classified.

== Taxonomy ==
The genera now assigned to the family Passerellidae were previously included with the buntings in the family Emberizidae. A phylogenetic analysis of nuclear and mitochondrial DNA sequences published in 2015 found that the Passerellidae formed a monophyletic group that had an uncertain relationship to the Emberizidae. Emberizidae was therefore split and the family Passerellidae resurrected. It had originally been introduced, as the subfamily Passerellinae, by the German ornithologist Jean Cabanis in 1851.

The International Ornithological Congress (IOC) recognizes 140 species in the family, distributed among these 30 genera. For more detail, see list of New World sparrow species.

Passerellidae

- Genus Oreothraupis
- Genus Chlorospingus
- Genus Rhynchospiza
- Genus Peucaea
- Genus Ammodramus
- Genus Arremonops
- Genus Amphispizopsis
- Genus Amphispiza
- Genus Chondestes
- Genus Calamospiza
- Genus Spizella
- Genus Arremon
- Genus Passerella
- Genus Spizelloides
- Genus Junco
- Genus Zonotrichia
- Genus Artemisiospiza
- Genus Oriturus
- Genus Pooecetes
- Genus Ammospiza
- Genus Centronyx
- Genus Passerculus
- Genus Xenospiza
- Genus Melospiza
- Genus Pezopetes
- Genus Torreornis
- Genus Melozone
- Genus Aimophila
- Genus Pipilo
- Genus Atlapetes

Below is a phylogeny based on a 2016 study by Robert Bryson and colleagues. (Note: Species in three monotypic genera were not sampled in the study: the Sierra Madre sparrow (Xenospiza baileyi), the Zapata sparrow (Torreornis inexpectata) and the tanager finch (Oreothraupis arremonops))

- Passerellidae
  - - Spizella – 6 species
    - - Amphispiza – black-throated sparrow
      - - Calamospiza – lark bunting
        - Chondestes – lark sparrow
  - - Chlorospingus – 8 species
    - - - - Arremonops – 4 species
          - Rhynchospiza – 3 species
        - - Peucaea – 8 species
          - Ammodramus – 3 species
      - - Arremon – 21 species
        - - - - Junco – 5 species
              - Zonotrichia – 5 species
            - - Passerella – fox sparrow
              - Spizelloides – American tree sparrow
          - - - - - Melozone – 8 species
                  - Aimophila – 3 species
                - - Pezopetes – large-footed finch
                  - - Atlapetes – 34 species
                    - Pipilo – 5 species
            - - - Artemisiospiza – 2 species
                - Pooecetes – vesper sparrow
                - Oriturus – striped sparrow
              - - Ammospiza – 4 species
                - - Melospiza – 3 species
                  - Passerculus – 1 species

== Morphology ==
Being a member of Emberizoidea, New World sparrows have only nine easily visible primary feathers on each wing (they also have a 10th primary, but it is greatly reduced and largely concealed). Despite their name, not all of the New World sparrows resemble the typical image of a sparrow. Species in the neotropics tend to be much larger with bold patterns of greens, reds, yellows, and grays. Those in the Nearctic realm are smaller, with brown bodies streaked and with some head patterns. Some even have sexual dimorphism such as the lark bunting and eastern towhee.

== Habitat and distribution ==
The New World sparrows are found throughout the Americas, from their breeding ranges in the Arctic tundra of North America to their year-round ranges in the Southern Cone of South America. Given this huge expansive range, many species occupy different habitats such as grasslands, rainforests, temperate forests, and deserts and xeric shrublands. Those that breed in the northern parts of North America, such as the white-throated sparrow and Lincoln's sparrow, migrate further southward into the continent during the winter, while others like the dark-eyed junco have been able to adapt to staying all year-round in some areas of North America. Most North American passerellid species usually migrate short distances. Some of the Southern Cone species move northward during autumn. In the breeding season, sparrows of different species form small-to-medium flocks, as they do when foraging in the non-breeding season.

== Gallery ==
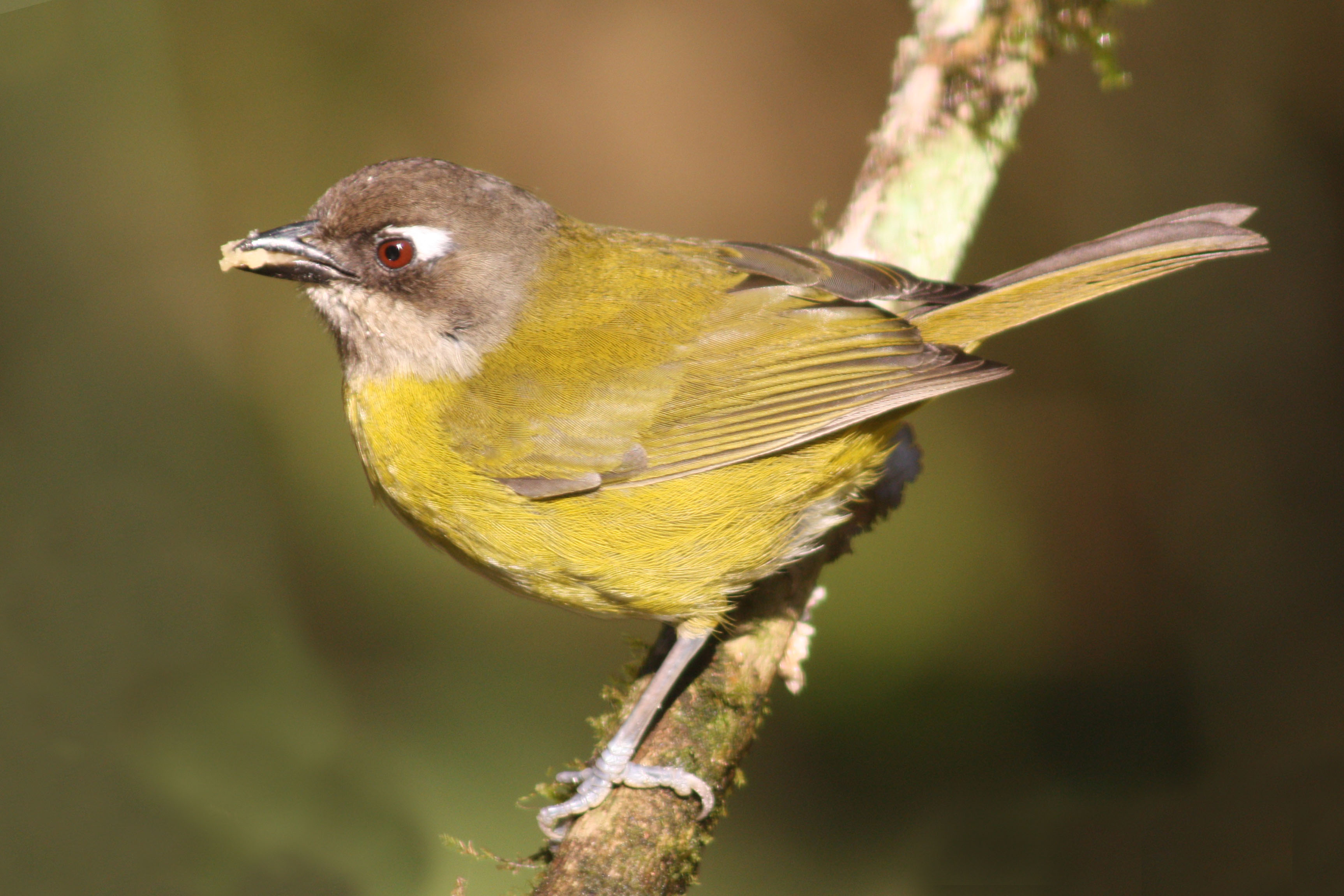
Common bush tanager (Chlorospingus flavopectus)

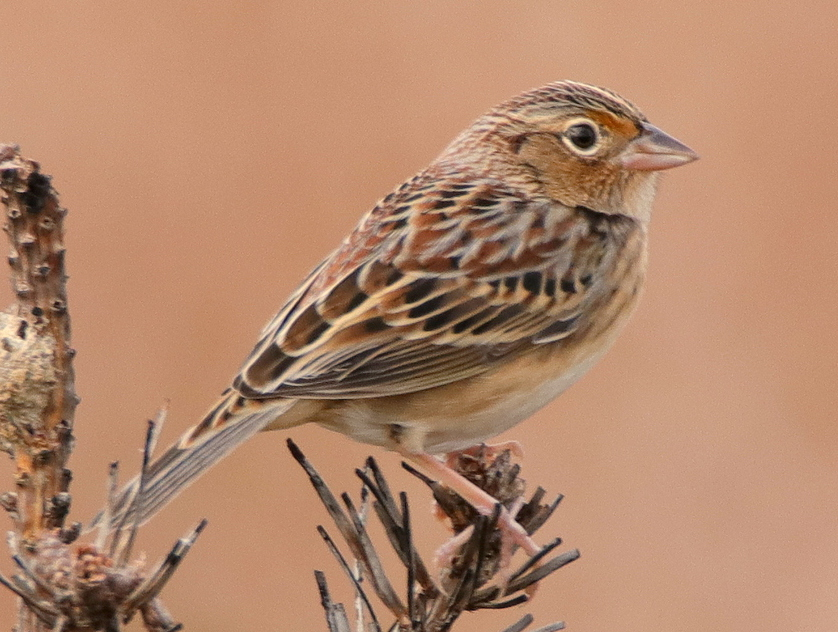
Grasshopper sparrow (Ammodramus savannarum)

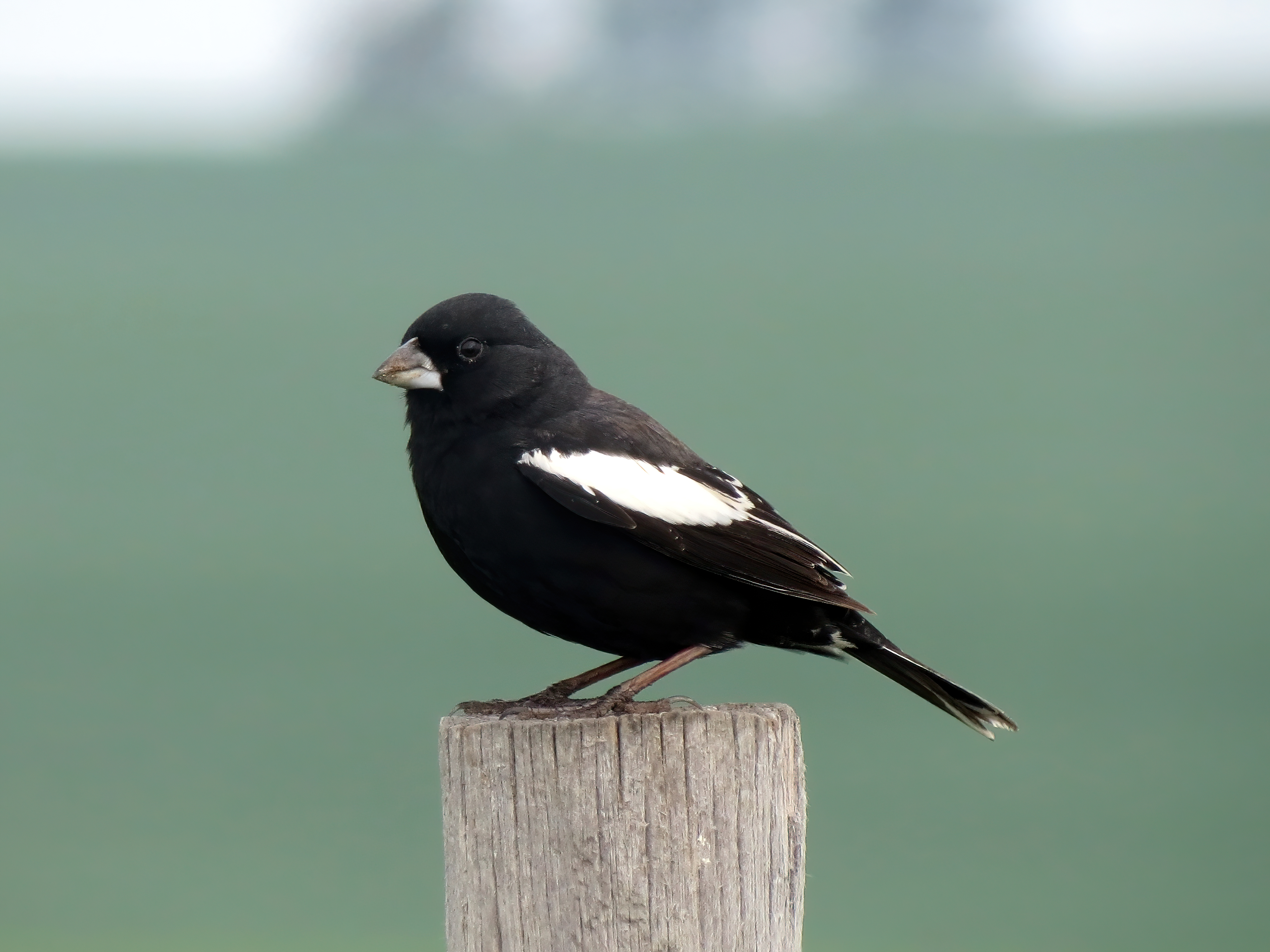
Male lark bunting (Calamospiza melanocorys)

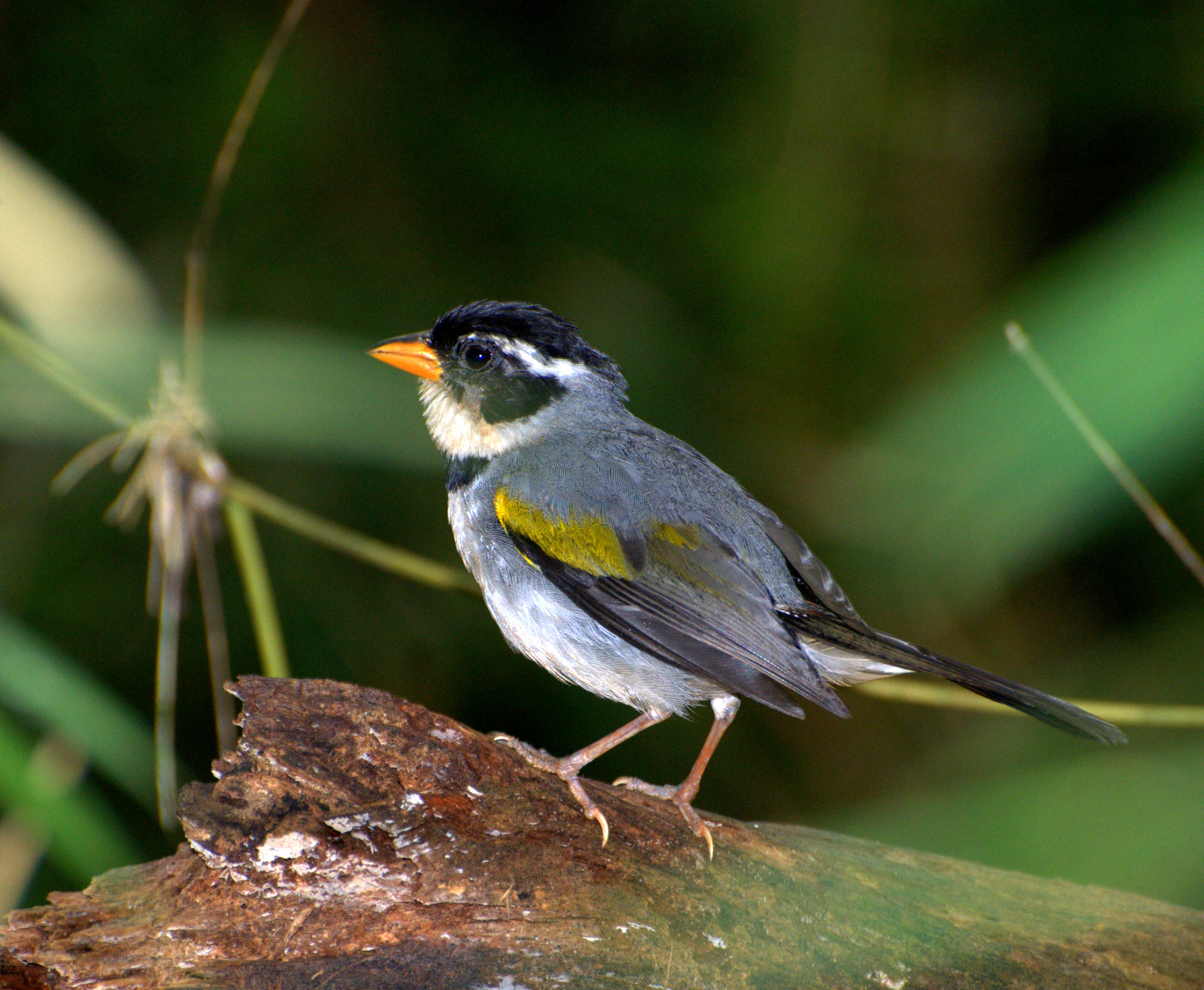
Saffron-billed sparrow (Arremon flavirostris)

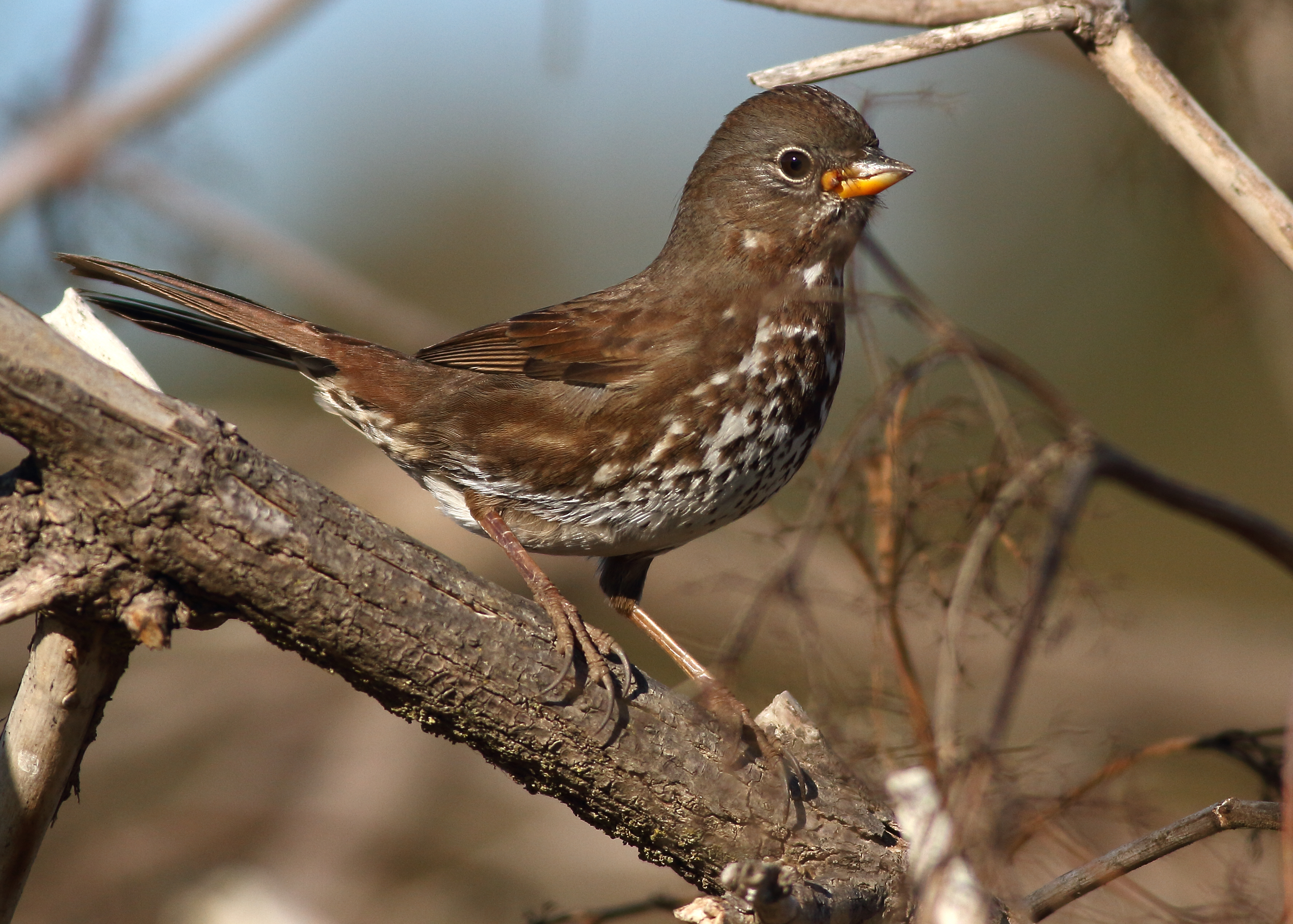
Sooty fox sparrow (Passerella iliaca unalaschcensis)

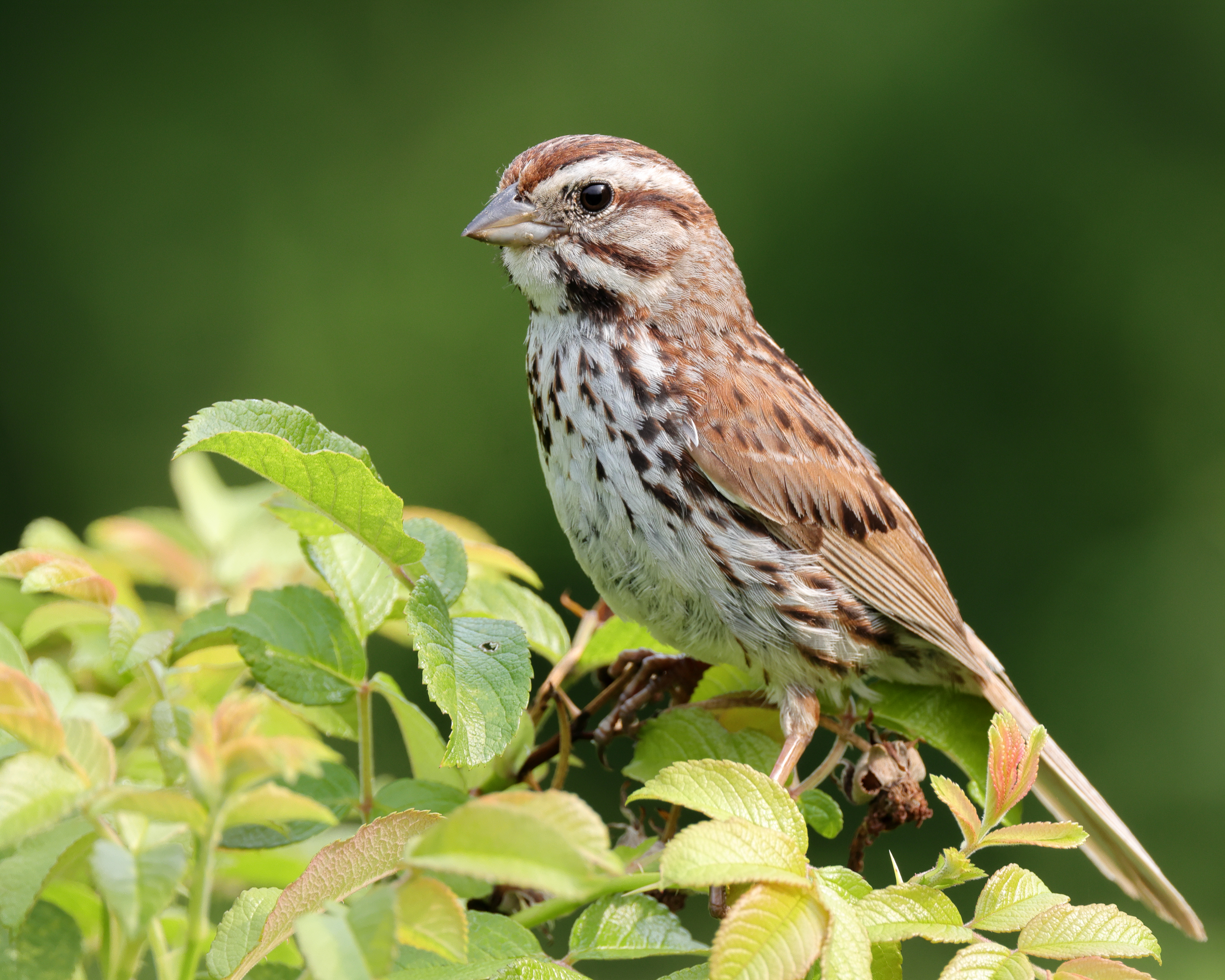
Song sparrow (Melospiza melodia)

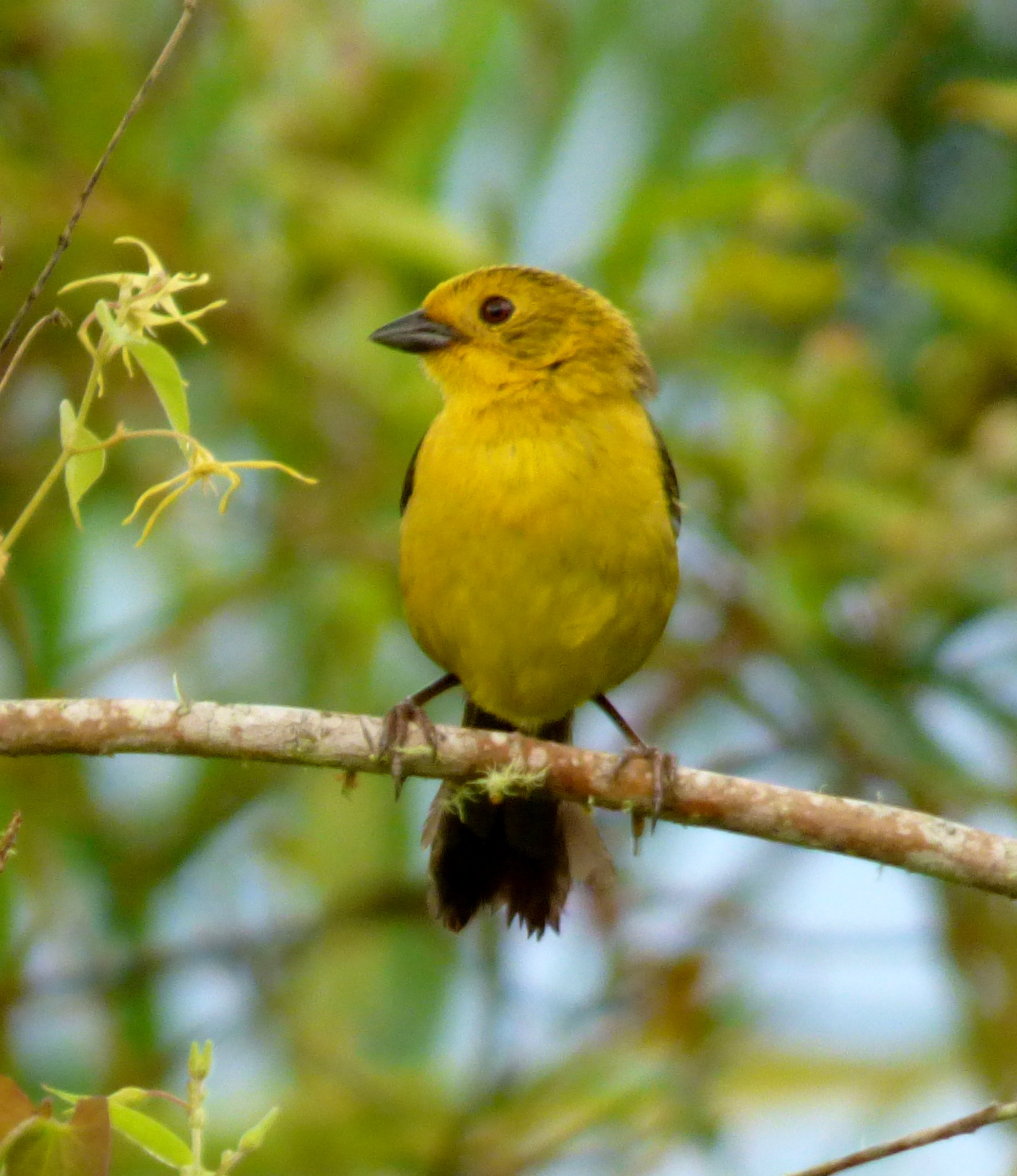
Yellow-headed brushfinch (Atlapetes flaviceps)
