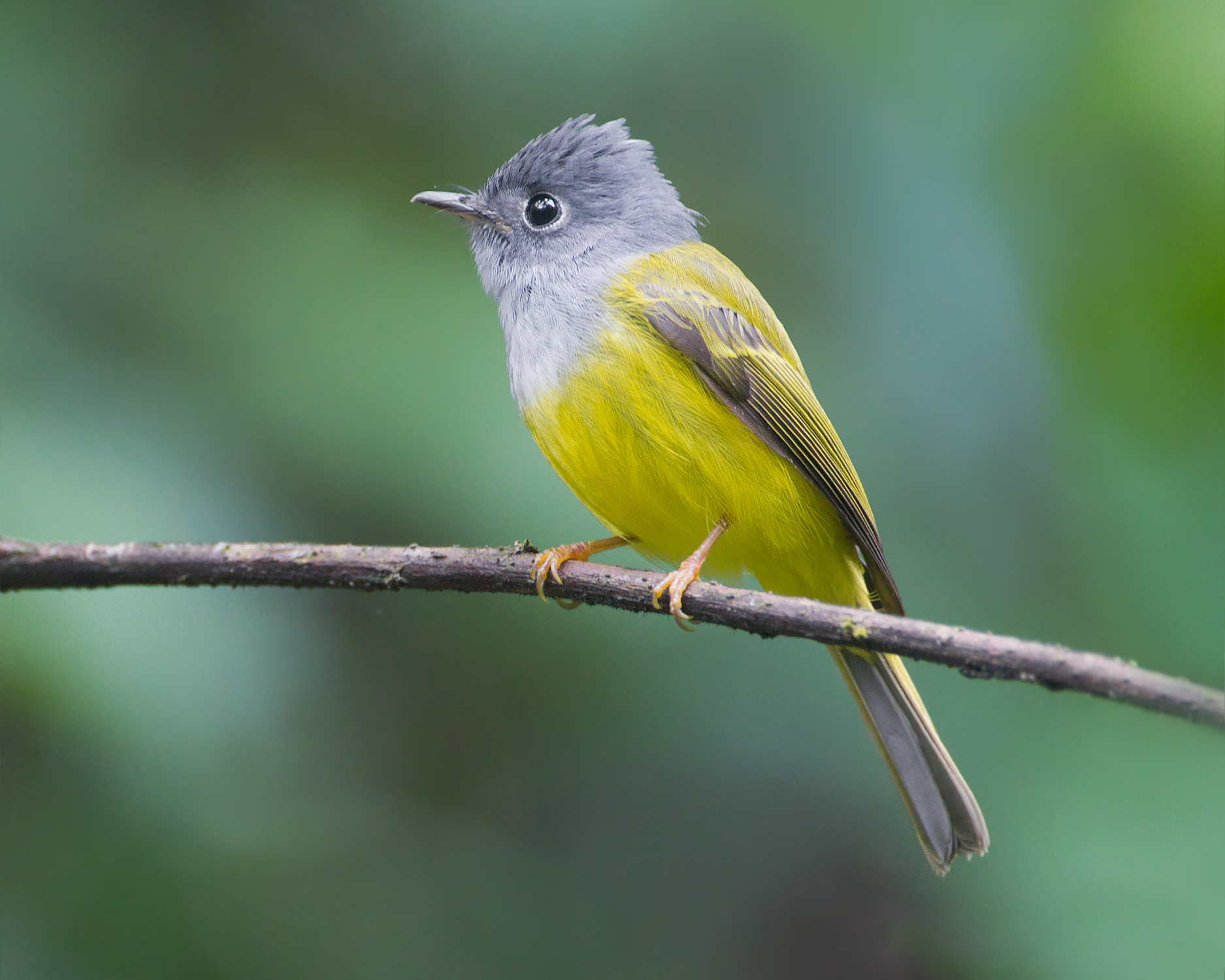
- Adult at Mae Wong National Park, Thailand

Conservation status
- Least Concern (IUCN 3.1)

Scientific classification
- Kingdom: Animalia
- Phylum: Chordata
- Class: Aves
- Order: Passeriformes
- Family: Stenostiridae
- Genus: Culicicapa
- Species: C. ceylonensis

Binomial name
- Culicicapa ceylonensis (Swainson, 1820)

Synonyms
- Platyrhynchus ceylonensis (protonym)

Audio
- Call (recorded in southern India)

= Grey-headed canary-flycatcher =

Species of bird

The grey-headed canary-flycatcher (Culicicapa ceylonensis), sometimes known as the grey-headed flycatcher, is a species of small flycatcher-like bird found in tropical Asia. It has a square crest, a grey hood and yellow underparts. They are found mainly in forested habitats where they often join other birds in mixed-species foraging flocks. Pairs are often seen as they forage for insects by making flycatcher-like sallies and calling aloud. Several subspecies are recognized within their wide distribution range. In the past the genus Culicicapa was considered to be an Old World flycatcher but studies have found them to belong to a new family designated as the Stenostiridae or fairy flycatchers that include the African genera Stenostira and Elminia.

== Description ==
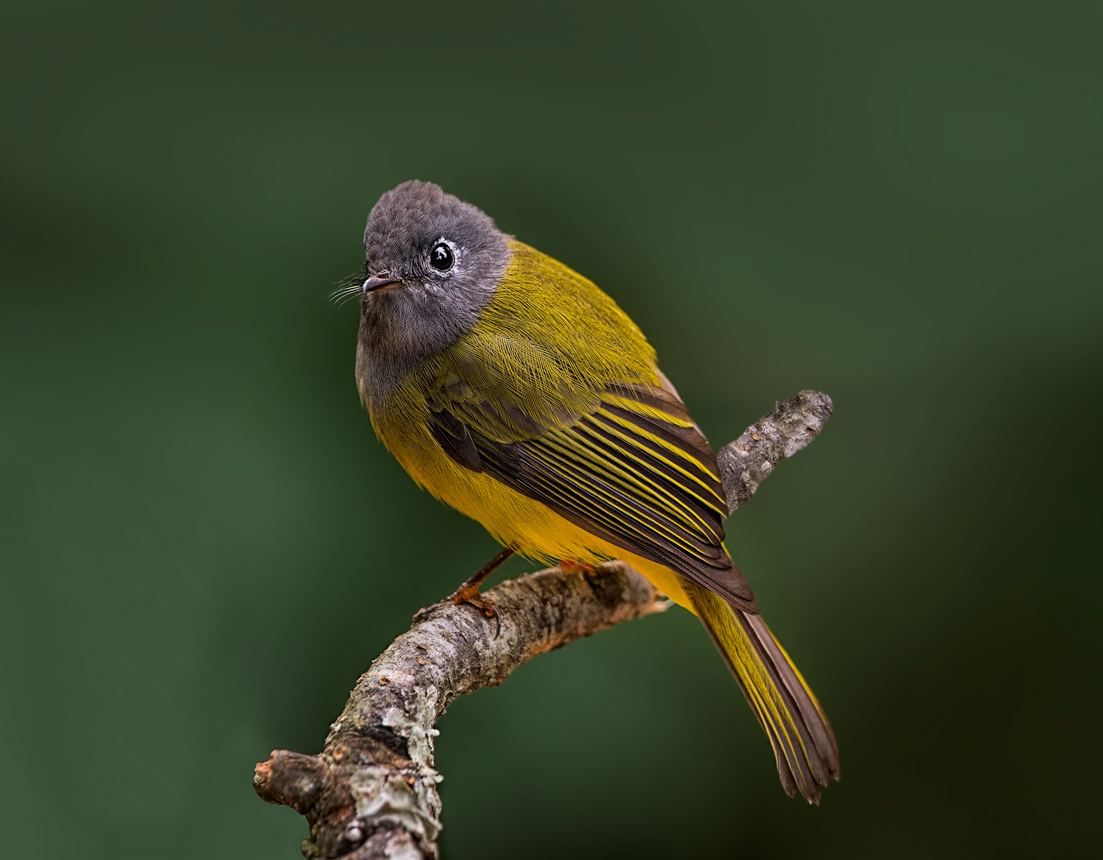
Nominate subspecies from India

The grey-headed canary-flycatcher is about 12–13 cm (4.7–5.1 in) long with a squarish grey head, a canary yellow belly and yellowish-green upperparts. They forage actively like flycatchers and perches in a very upright posture. The sexes are indistinguishable in plumage. They have a very flat bill (which gave it the earlier genus name of Platyrhynchus) which when seen from above look like an equilateral triangle and is fringed with long rictal bristles.

Across their range, populations differ in the shades of the colours and vary slightly in dimensions and several of these have been designated as subspecies. The nominate subspecies breeds in peninsular India in the hills of the Western Ghats, Nilgiris, central India and the Eastern Ghats (Lammasingi) and Sri Lanka. Subspecies calochrysea first described by Harry Oberholser in 1923 breeds along the Himalayas east to Myanmar and Thailand and winters across southern India. The nominate form is darker in shade. Subspecies antioxantha which was also described by Oberholser has a breeding range from southern Burma, Thailand through Malaysia to Java and Bali. The island population sejuncta described by Ernst Hartert in 1897 is found on Sumbawa, Flores and possibly on Lombok while connectens described by Bernhard Rensch in 1931 is restricted to the island of Sumba.

The grey-headed canary-flycatcher was earlier considered to be an Old World flycatcher in spite of its odd crest, colours and nature of vocalization. Molecular phylogeny studies however show that they are quite different and have been placed in the family Stenostiridae that is closely related to the tits and penduline-tits.

Fraser's Hill (Malaysia), September 1997

== Habitat and distribution ==
This species breeds in upland to montane oak (Quercus) and other broadleaved forests and similar wooded areas in temperate to tropical southern Asia, from Pakistan, Central India, Bangladesh and Sri Lanka east to Indonesia and southern China. Many populations are resident, but some Himalayan birds are partial migrants that winter in peninsular India sometimes even occurring in arid habitats. Other populations may make altitudinal movements but in parts of the eastern Himalayas such as Bhutan, they have been found to occur all year round, and can be found up to and above 2,000 m ASL. During the non-breeding season, they are seen in the plains and lower elevations (September to March in India) when they prefer well wooded areas of relatively mature secondary forests, abandoned plantations and overgrown gardens, usually near water and streams including wooded gorges. They are very active and noisy throughout the day foraging at all levels of the forest.

== Behaviour and ecology ==
The grey-headed canary-flycatcher is an insectivore and like flycatchers makes sallies for aerial insects from a low perch under the canopy of a tree. A pair may forage together and they will often join mixed-species foraging flocks. They breed in summer (April to June in India and possibly later in western China ). The nest, built by the female alone, is an unlined cup bound by cobwebs and often attached to and covered by moss. The nest is found placed against the mossy trunk of a tree or built on rocks or on a ledge in a mud bank. The typical clutch is three or four eggs. Hodgson's hawk-cuckoo has been observed parasitizing the brood of this species in northern Borneo.

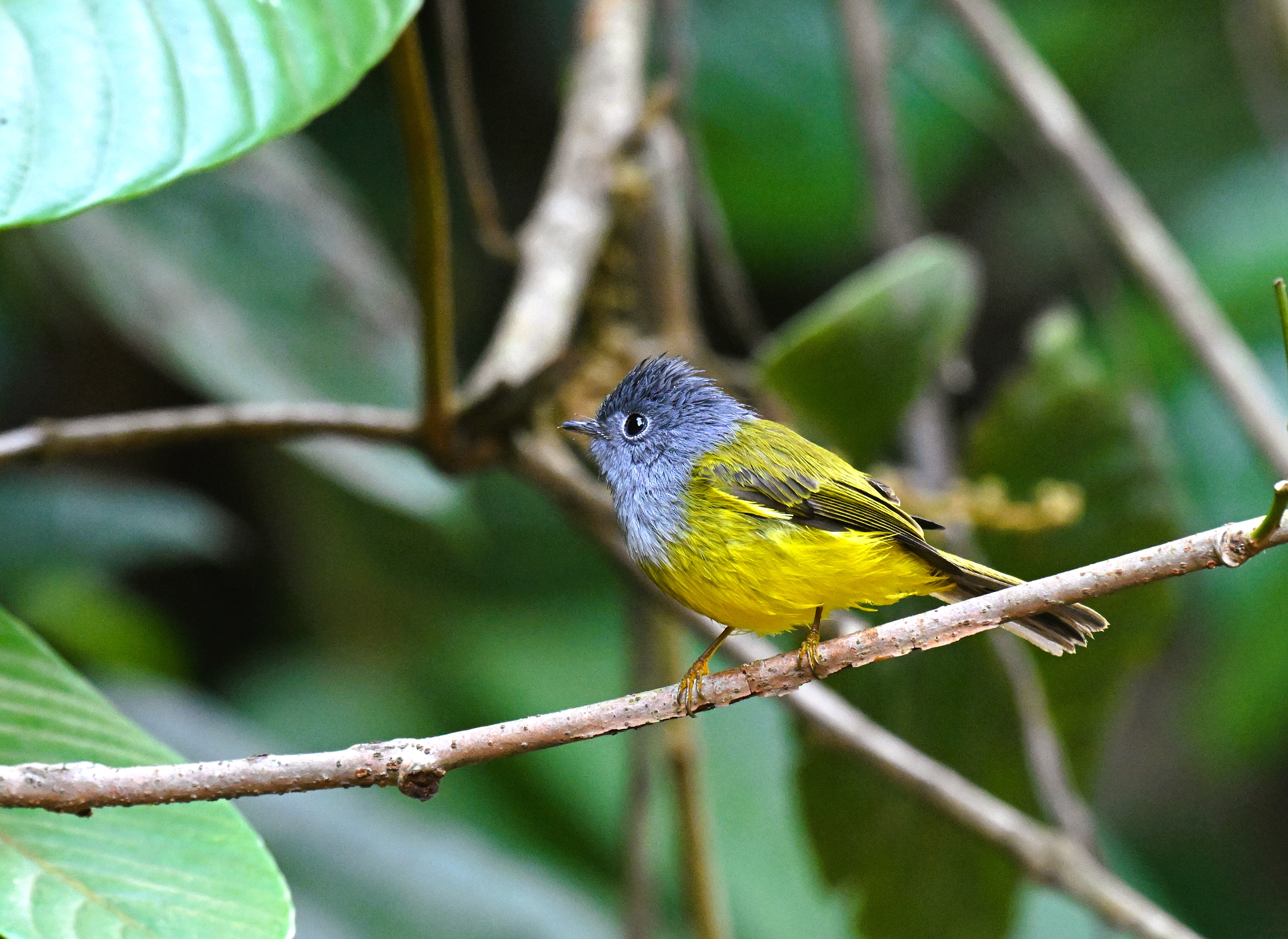
Dulung, Assam
