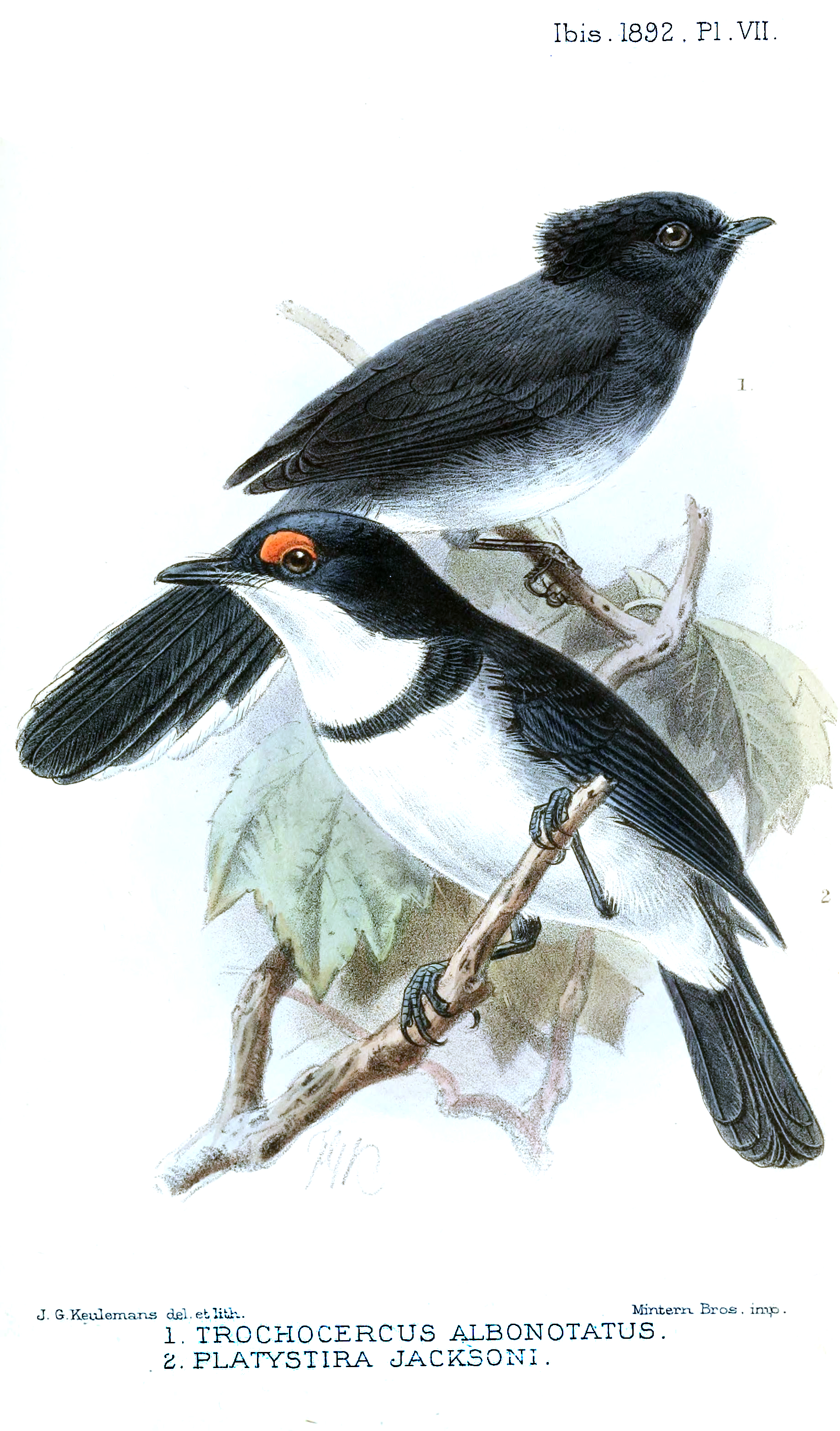
- Illustration (bird above)

Conservation status
- Least Concern (IUCN 3.1)

Scientific classification
- Kingdom: Animalia
- Phylum: Chordata
- Class: Aves
- Order: Passeriformes
- Family: Stenostiridae
- Genus: Elminia
- Species: E. albonotata

Binomial name
- Elminia albonotata (Sharpe, 1891)

Synonyms
- Trochocercus albonotata

= White-tailed crested flycatcher =

Species of bird

The white-tailed crested flycatcher (Elminia albonotata) is a species of bird in the flycatcher family Stenostiridae. It has a discontinuous distribution in eastern Africa. There are three subspecies, E. a. albonotata of central Kenya, and Uganda through to south west Tanzania; E. a. subvaerulea, which ranges from southern Kenya to Malawi and E. a. swynnertoni of Zimbabwe and Mozambique.

The white-tailed crested flycatcher is a small (13 cm) crested flycatcher with a long tail. The wings and crest of are black, the rest of the plumage is grey overall with a white belly, rump and the underside of the tail. The bill is black, the eye dark brown and the legs grey. The call of this species is weak and unstructured.

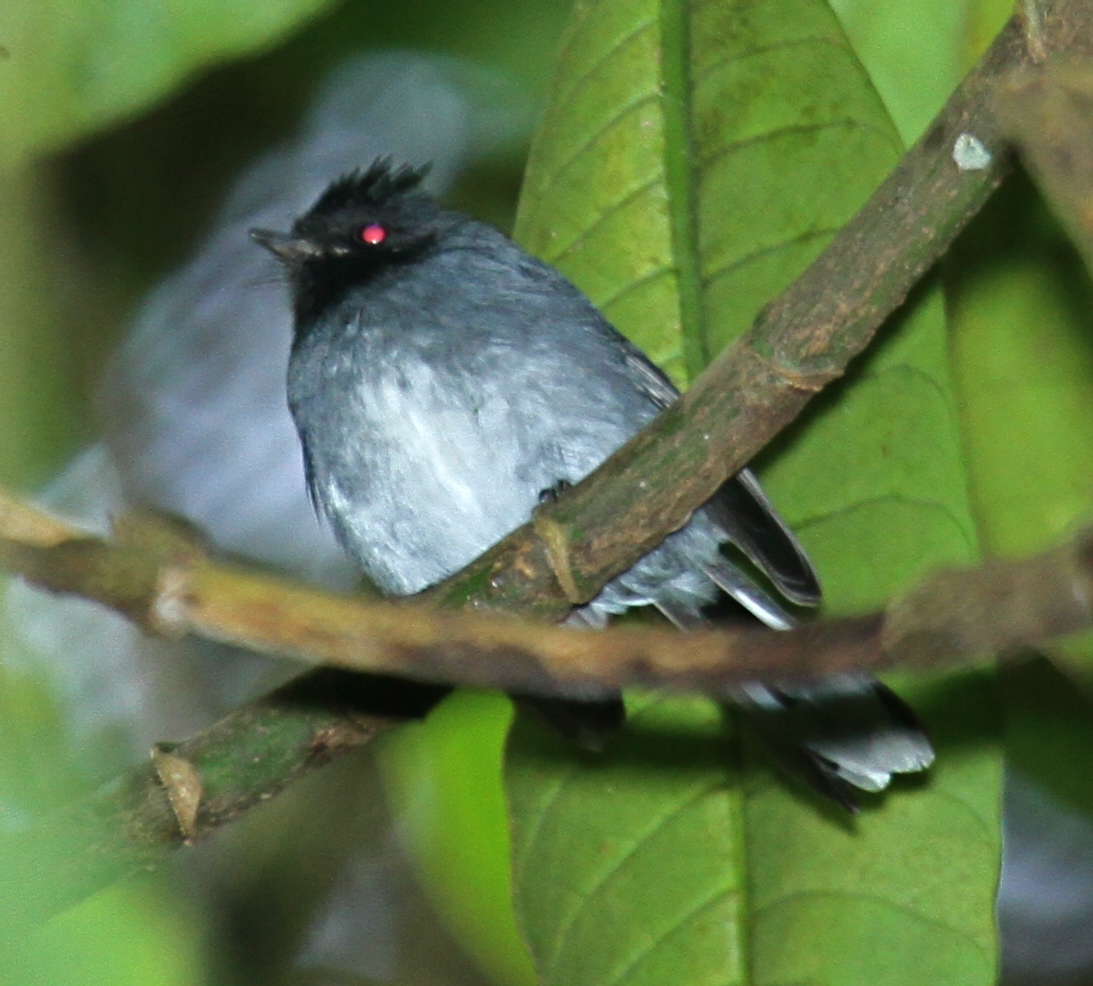
Gatamayu Forest - Kenya

Its natural habitat is subtropical or tropical evergreen montane forest and surrounding shrubland and bamboo. It is found from 600 m to 1900 m in Tanzania's Udzungwa Mountains, and up to 2700 m elsewhere. Where its range overlaps with the closely related white-bellied crested flycatcher this species is found at higher altitudes and not below 2250 m, where its relative it is absent it ranges as low as 1200 m.

The diet of this species is not well studied, although like most flycatchers it feeds on invertebrates including flies, ants, moths and spiders. They travel in pairs or small family groups, sometimes joining mixed-species feeding flocks. During the breeding season pairs are territorial. They are monogamous, at the start of the season the male displays to the female using its tail and feeds the female. Two eggs are laid in a small nest in the fork of a branch, usually 2 m high in a tree, but up to 6 m. There is a division of labour between the pair, with the female undertaking all the incubation and the male feeding the chicks once they hatch. Chicks fledge after 15 days.
