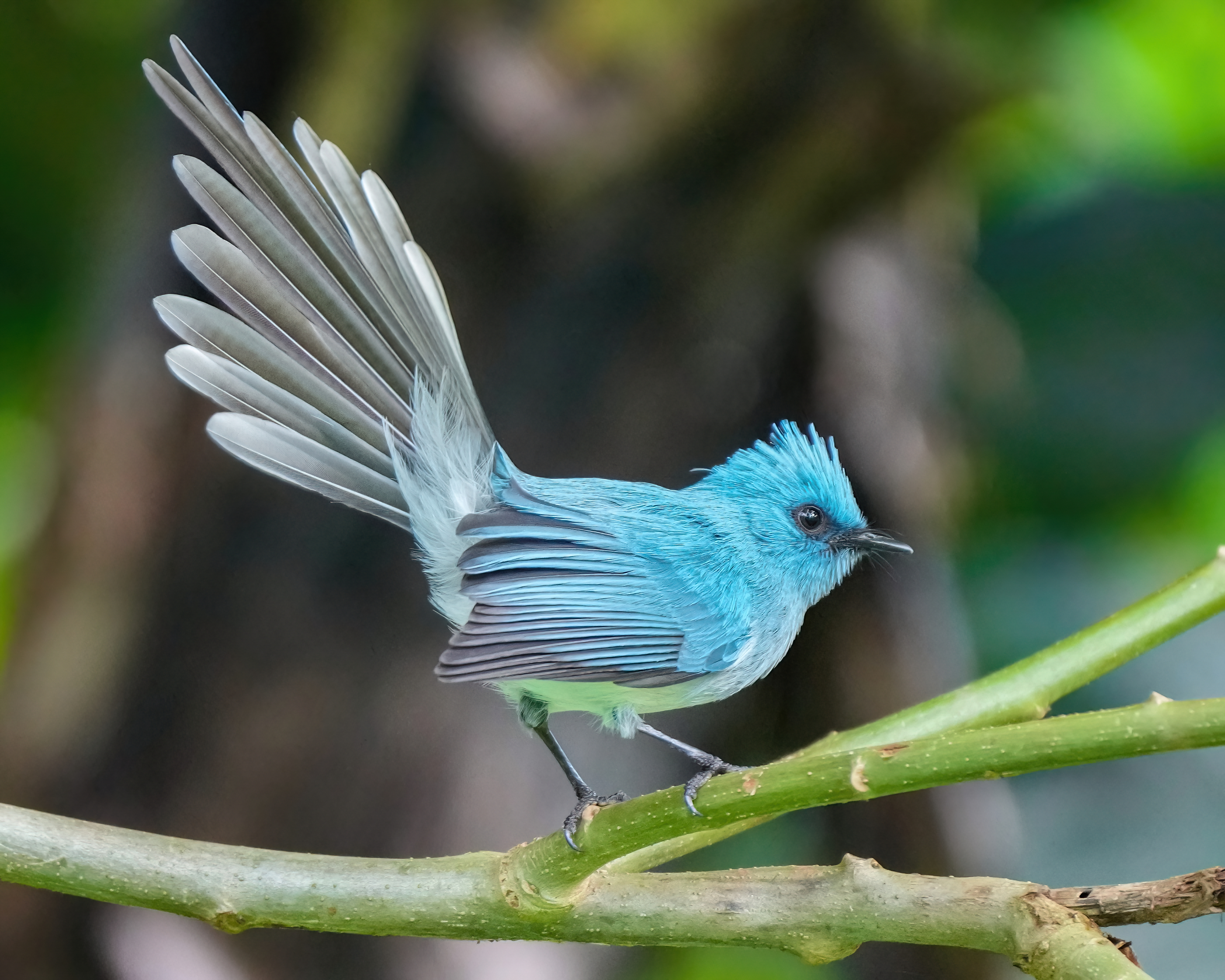
- Lateral view in Kibale, Uganda
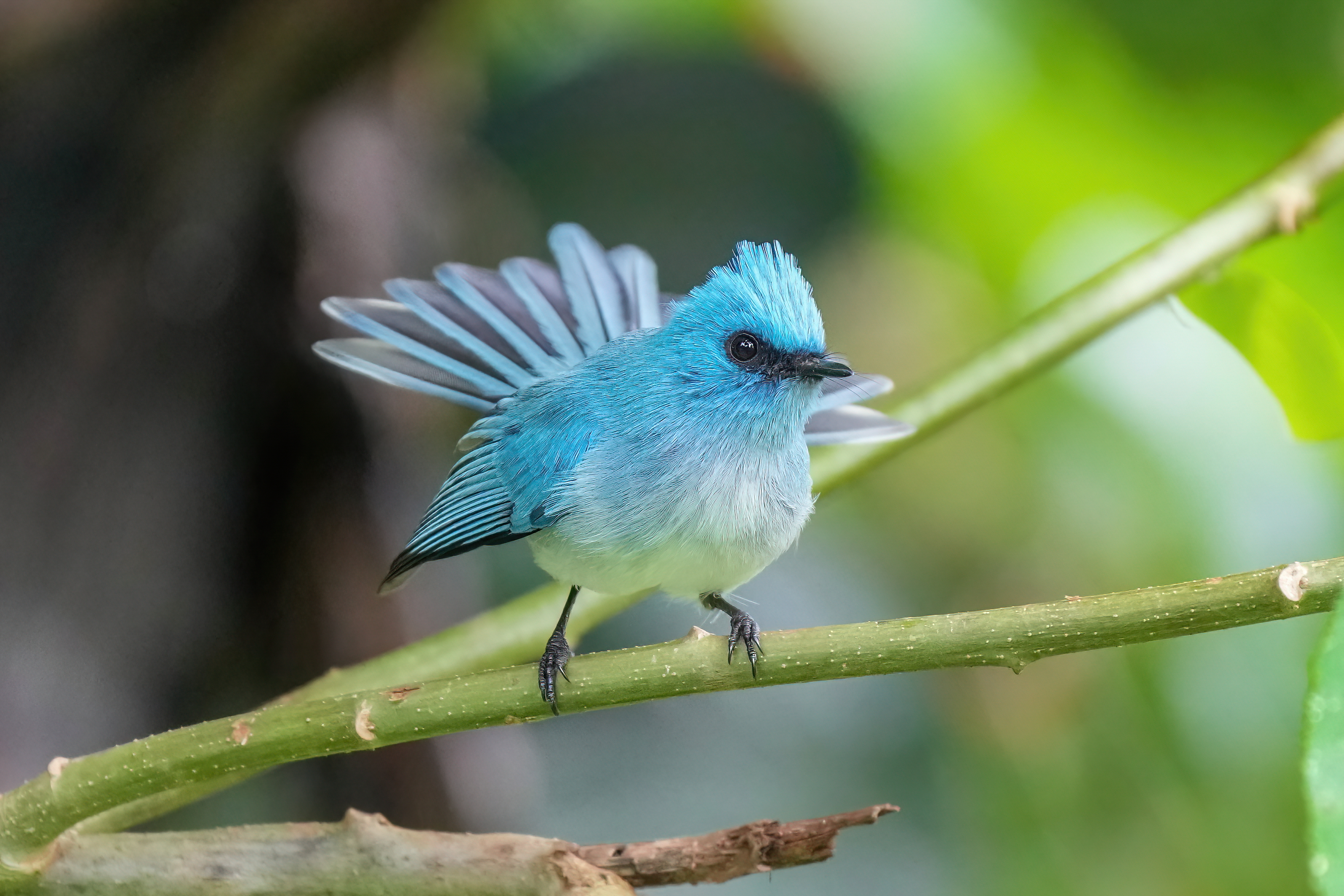
- Frontal view

Conservation status
- Least Concern (IUCN 3.1)

Scientific classification
- Kingdom: Animalia
- Phylum: Chordata
- Class: Aves
- Order: Passeriformes
- Family: Stenostiridae
- Genus: Elminia
- Species: E. longicauda

Binomial name
- Elminia longicauda (Swainson, 1838)
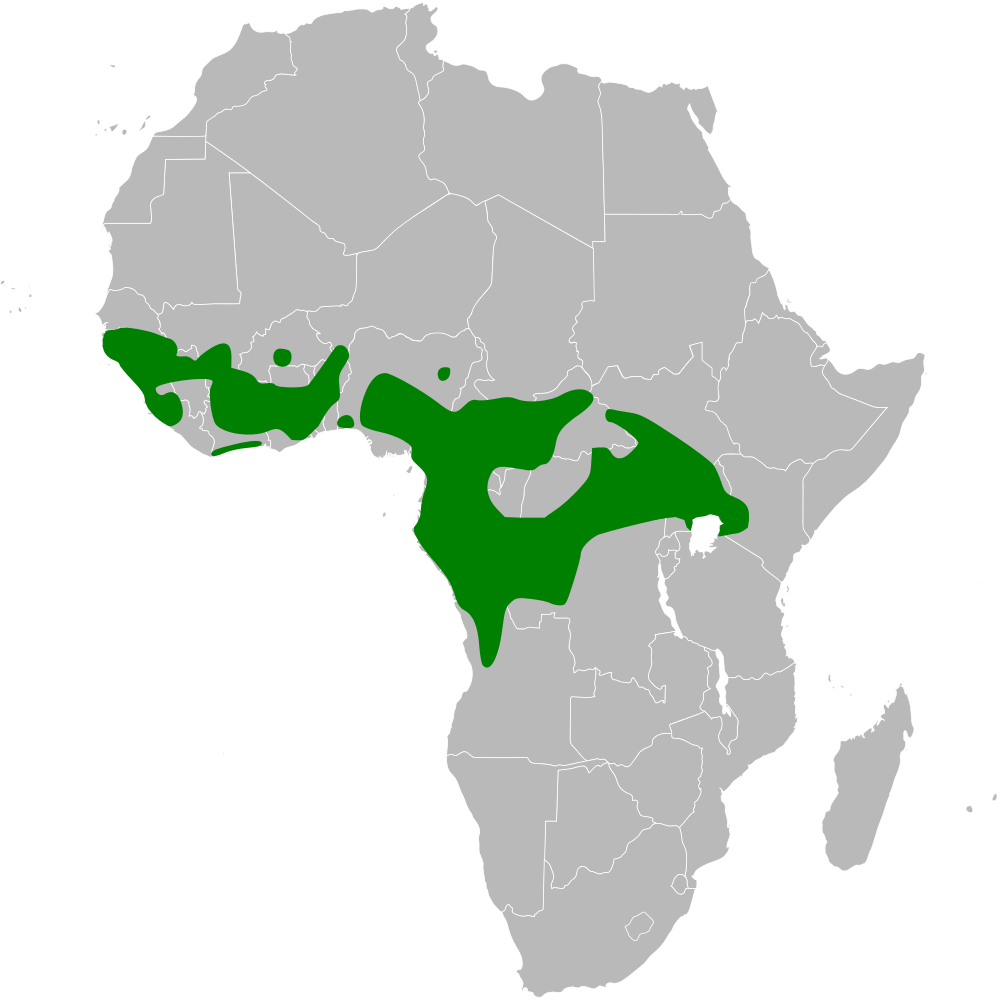
- Range of African blue flycatcher

Synonyms
- Myiagra longicauda

= African blue flycatcher =

Species of bird

The African blue flycatcher or blue-crested flycatcher (Elminia longicauda) is a species of bird in the family Stenostiridae found in parts of West, Central and East Africa.

== Description ==
The African blue flycatcher is a dainty, pale, bright blue flycatcher with a short crest and long tail. The entire upper parts and tail are bright blue, shading between blue and cyan, with black lores and black flight feathers edged with blue, the underparts are greyish blue fading to whitish on the belly. The bill and legs are black. Juveniles are duller with faint greyish spotting on the head and wing coverts. It measures 15–18 cm (5.9–7.1 in) in length and weighs 7–12 g (0.25–0.42 oz).

=== Vocalisation ===
The song of the African blue flycatcher is a series of slow, rather random and tuneless sibilant notes strung together in no particular order. Call is a quiet "tsip".

== Distribution ==
The African blue flycatcher occurs from Mauritania, Senegal and Gambia east discontinuously to Kenya and south through the eastern Democratic Republic of Congo to northern Angola.

== Habitat ==
Its natural habitats are moist lowland forests, mangrove forests, gallery forests, montane forests, gardens, wooded farmland, and moist savanna.

== Habits ==
The African blue flycatcher forages rather gracefully with a fanned tail and half open wings among leaves, as well as occasionally foraging on the ground and flycatching.

== Taxonomy ==
The African blue flycatcher is thought to form a superspecies with the white-tailed blue flycatcher and these species; the two have been placed in a separate genus Errannornis, but the differences between this species pair and the other species classified in Elminia are considered insufficient to merit generic separation.

Two subspecies of the African blue flycatcher are currently recognised. Elminia longicauda longicauda (Swainson, 1838) which is found in the western part of its range as far east as Nigeria, and the paler Elminia longicauda teresita Antinori, 1864 in the west and the south.
