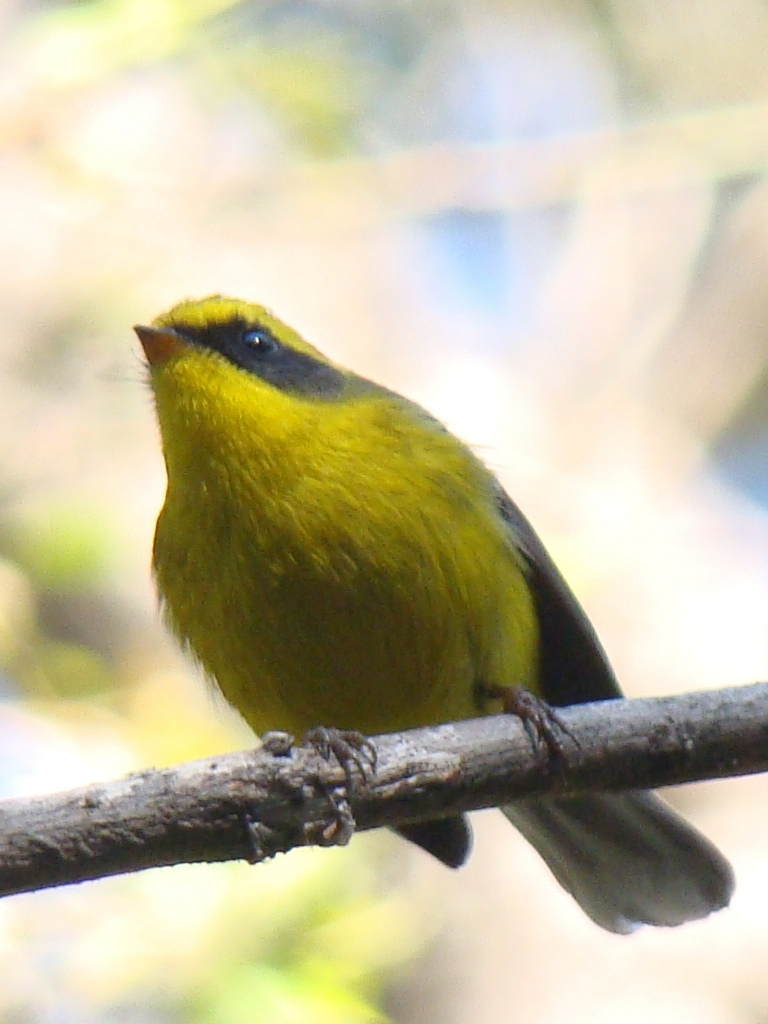

Conservation status
- Least Concern (IUCN 3.1)

Scientific classification
- Kingdom: Animalia
- Phylum: Chordata
- Class: Aves
- Order: Passeriformes
- Family: Stenostiridae
- Genus: Chelidorhynx; Blyth, 1843
- Species: C. hypoxanthus

Binomial name
- Chelidorhynx hypoxanthus (Blyth, 1843)

Synonyms
- Rhipidura hypoxantha Blyth, 1843; Chelidorhynx hypoxantha

= Yellow-bellied fantail =

Species of bird

The yellow-bellied fantail (Chelidorhynx hypoxanthus), also known as the yellow-bellied fairy-fantail, is found in the Indian subcontinent, the Himalayas, and portions of Southeast Asia including Thailand, Vietnam, and Myanmar. It is an altitudinal migrant.

== Description ==
It is about 8 cm (3.1 in) in size. It is yellow below and has a black eye-stripe, white wing-bar and broad black tail tipped white.

== Classification ==
It used to be placed in the family of the fantails (Rhipiduridae), but DNA analysis has shown it to be a close relative of the fairy flycatcher and it has therefore been transferred to the Stenostiridae, in the revalidated monotypic genus Chelidorhynx.

== Social Behavior ==
It often gathers in mixed-species flocks, especially during winter, with leaf-warblers, tits, and black-faced warblers.

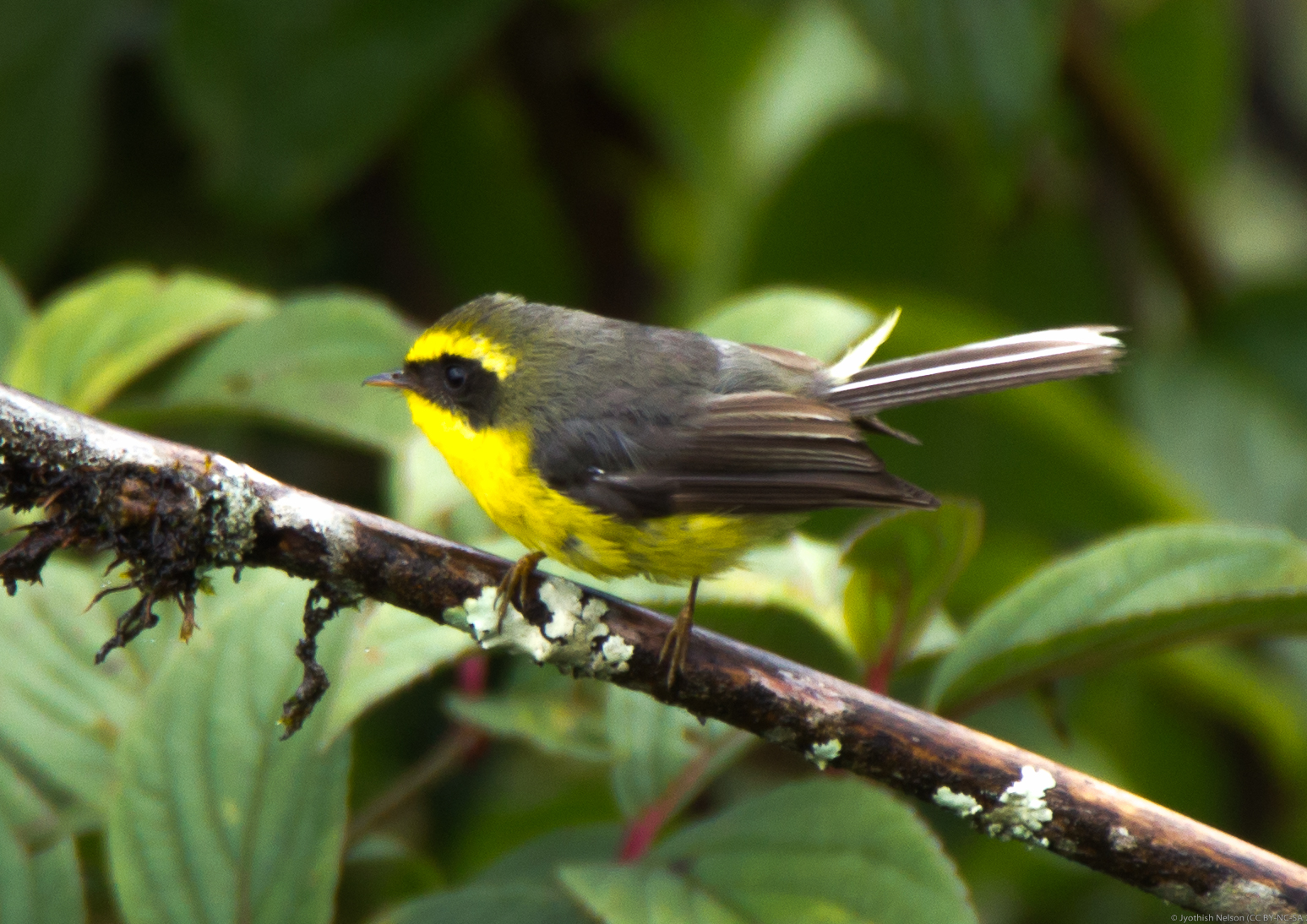
Yellow-bellied fantail at Zuluk, Sikkim
