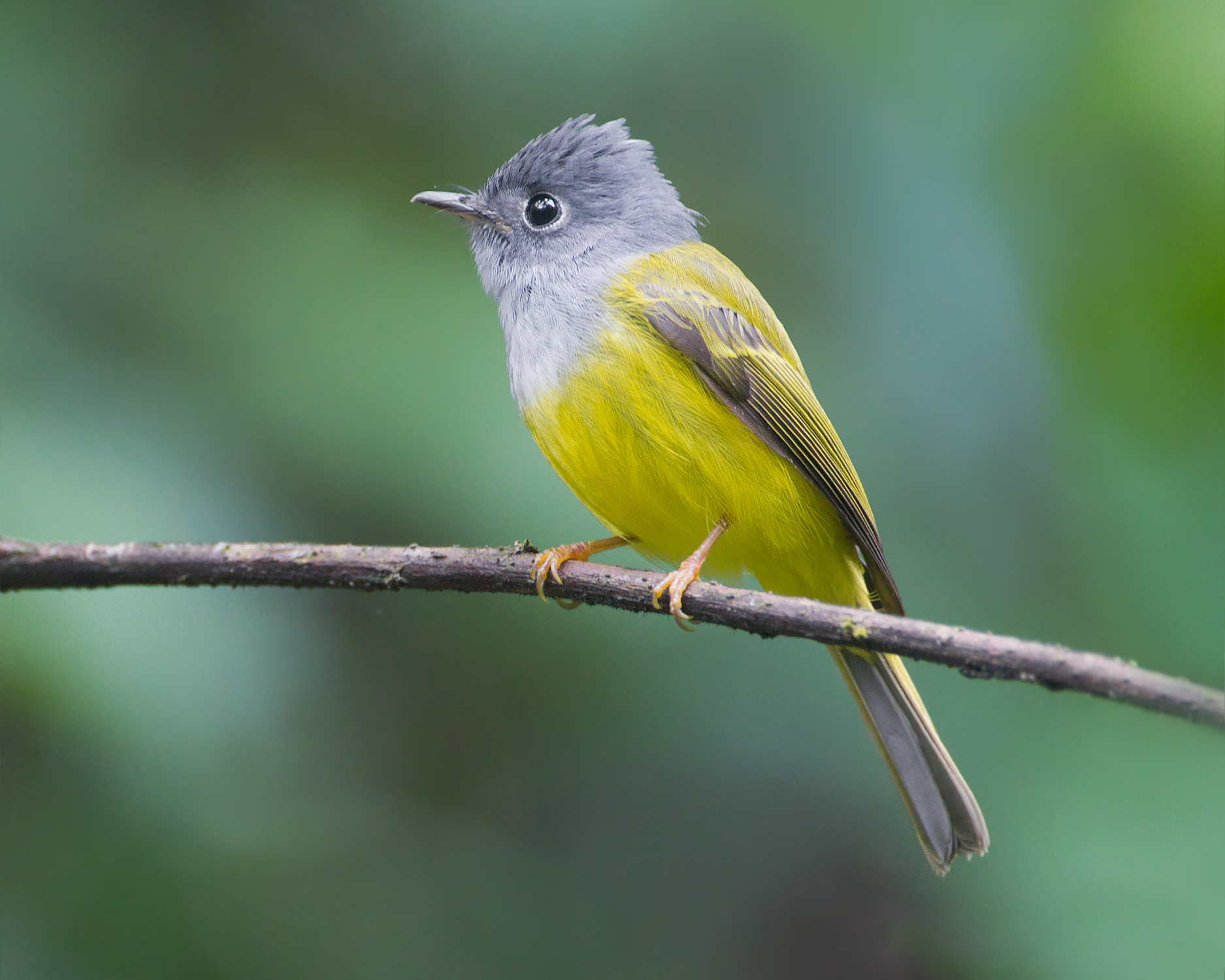
- Grey-headed canary-flycatcher (Culicicapa ceylonensis)

Scientific classification
- Kingdom: Animalia
- Phylum: Chordata
- Class: Aves
- Order: Passeriformes
- Parvorder: Sylviida
- Family: Stenostiridae; Beresford, F.K. Barker, Ryan & Crowe, 2005
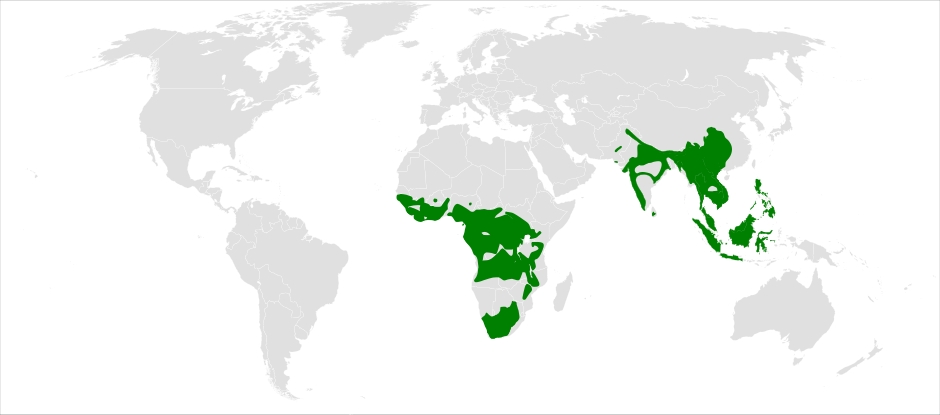

= Stenostiridae =

Family of birds

Stenostiridae, or the fairy flycatchers, are a family of small passerine birds proposed as a result of recent discoveries in molecular systematics. They are also referred to as stenostirid warblers.

== Taxonomy and systematics ==
This new clade is named after the fairy flycatcher, a distinct species placed formerly in the Old World flycatchers. This is united with the "sylvioid flycatchers": the genus Elminia (formerly placed in the Monarchinae) and the closely allied former Old World flycatcher genus Culicicapa, as well as one species formerly believed to be an aberrant fantail.

Image	Genus	Living species
	Stenostira Cabanis & Bonaparte 1850	Fairy flycatcher, Stenostira scita
	Elminia Swainson, 1838	African blue flycatcher, Elminia longicauda; White-tailed blue flycatcher, Elminia albicauda; Dusky crested flycatcher, Elminia nigromitrata; White-bellied crested flycatcher, Elminia albiventris; White-tailed crested flycatcher, Elminia albonotata
	Chelidorhynx Blyth, 1843	Yellow-bellied fantail, Chelidorhynx hypoxanthus
	Culicicapa Swainson, 1820	Grey-headed canary-flycatcher, Culicicapa ceylonensis; Citrine canary-flycatcher, Culicicapa helianthea

Other African or Asian species might conceivably fall into this novel clade. The tit-flycatchers (Myioparus) are apparently true flycatchers morphologically somewhat convergent to Stenostira.

The Stenostiridae as a whole are related to penduline tits, titmice and chickadees. All these appear to be closer to the Sylvioidea than to other Passerida, but this is not robustly supported by the available data and they might constitute a distinct, more basal superfamily.
