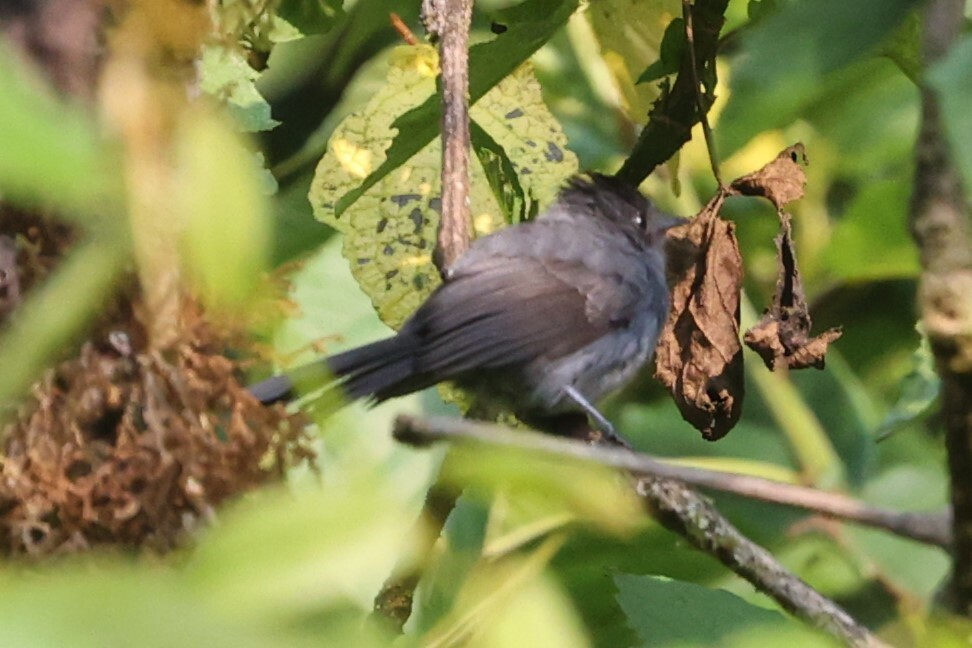

Conservation status
- Least Concern (IUCN 3.1)

Scientific classification
- Kingdom: Animalia
- Phylum: Chordata
- Class: Aves
- Order: Passeriformes
- Family: Stenostiridae
- Genus: Elminia
- Species: E. nigromitrata

Binomial name
- Elminia nigromitrata (Reichenow, 1874)

= Dusky crested flycatcher =

Species of bird

The dusky crested flycatcher (Elminia nigromitrata) is a species of bird in the family Stenostiridae. It is widespread across the African tropical rainforest. Its natural habitats are subtropical or tropical moist lowland forests and subtropical or tropical moist montane forests.
