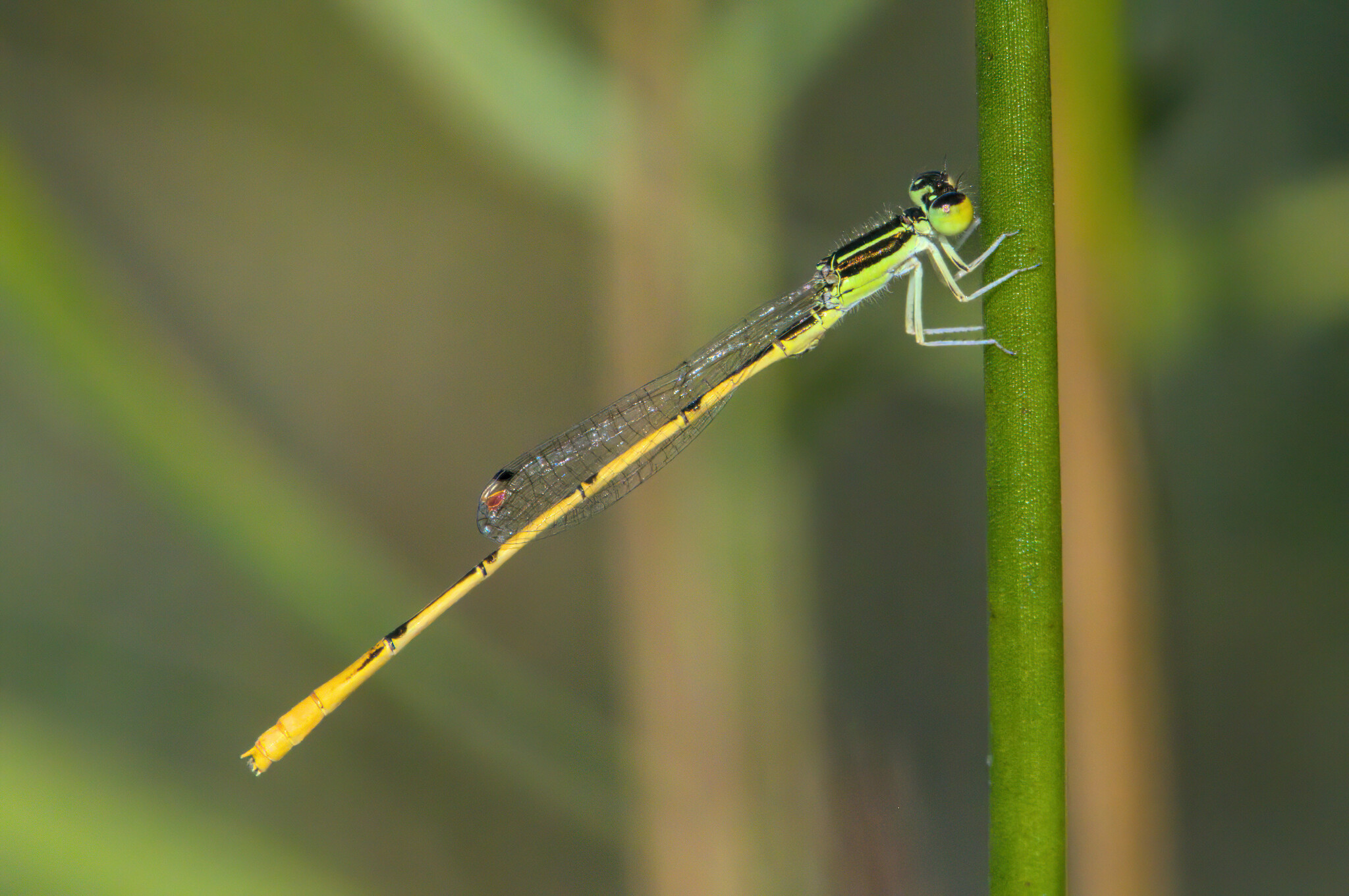

Conservation status
- Least Concern (IUCN 3.1)

- Secure (NatureServe)

Scientific classification
- Kingdom: Animalia
- Phylum: Arthropoda
- Clade: Pancrustacea
- Class: Insecta
- Order: Odonata
- Suborder: Zygoptera
- Family: Coenagrionidae
- Genus: Ischnura
- Species: I. hastata

Binomial name
- Ischnura hastata (Say, 1839)

= Citrine forktail =

Species of damselfly

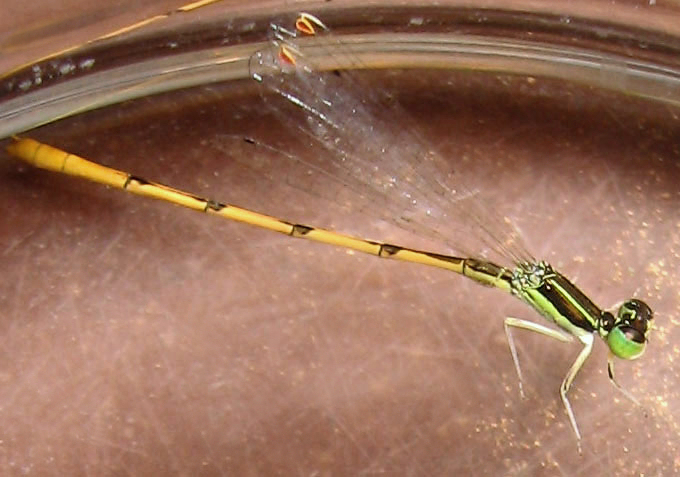
Male

The citrine forktail (Ischnura hastata) is a damselfly of the family Coenagrionidae.

== Description ==
This species is 20–27 mm in length, and its hindwing is 11–15 mm long; it is thus considerably smaller than most European members of the genus Ischnura.

Adult males have a black head and thorax, with blue markings, and a largely yellow abdomen, with black markings on its upper surface. The term citrine refers to its yellowish colouration. Adult females are initially largely orange, marked with black above on the head and rear part of the abdomen. They undergo a colour change, through brown or olive to greyish, as they mature.

Male citrine forktails are the only damselflies in the world with the pterostigma situated away from the leading edge of the wing.

== Distribution ==
It is native to North and South America, and there is a population on the Azores. The Azorean population is likely to have been present since the late 19th Century, it was not identified as this species until 1990.

== Life history ==
In North America, this species has a typical dragonfly life-history. However, the population on the Azores reproduces by parthenogenesis, making it the only population of Odonata anywhere in the world known to reproduce by this means.

In the southern United States, adults are on the wing year-round, while farther north the flight season is from April to November, and in the Azores from May to August.
