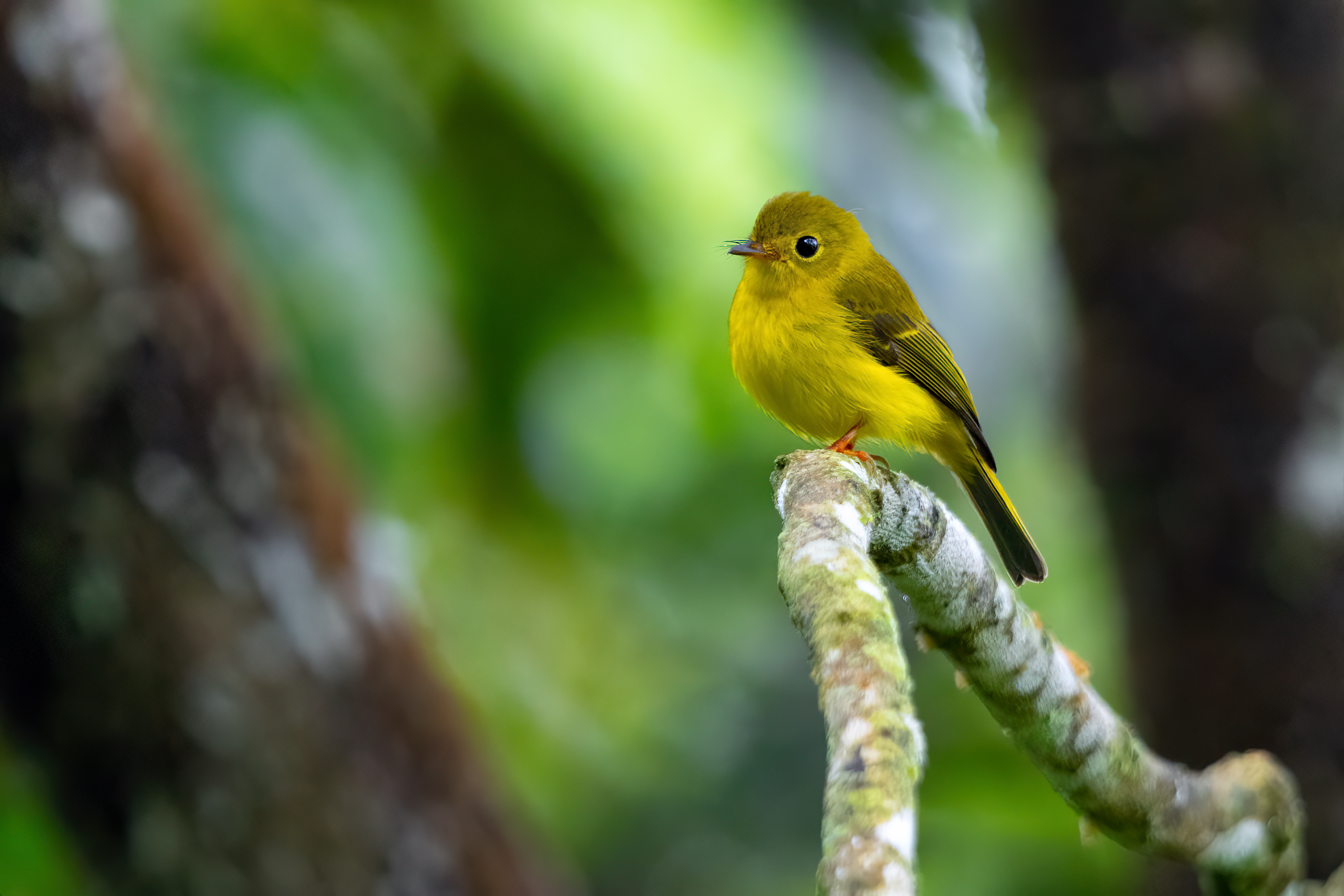

Conservation status
- Least Concern (IUCN 3.1)

Scientific classification
- Kingdom: Animalia
- Phylum: Chordata
- Class: Aves
- Order: Passeriformes
- Family: Stenostiridae
- Genus: Culicicapa
- Species: C. helianthea

Binomial name
- Culicicapa helianthea (Wallace, 1865)

= Citrine canary-flycatcher =

Species of bird

The citrine canary-flycatcher (Culicicapa helianthea) is a species of bird in the family Stenostiridae. The term citrine refers to its yellowish colouration. It is found in Sulawesi and the Philippines. Its natural habitat is subtropical or tropical moist montane forests.

It has been observed gathering in mixed-species flocks, with species including Everett's white-eyes, black-naped monarchs, orange-bellied flowerpeckers, elegant tits, crimson sunbirds, garden sunbirds, and Negros striped babblers.
