= Citrine (colour) =

Yellowish colour

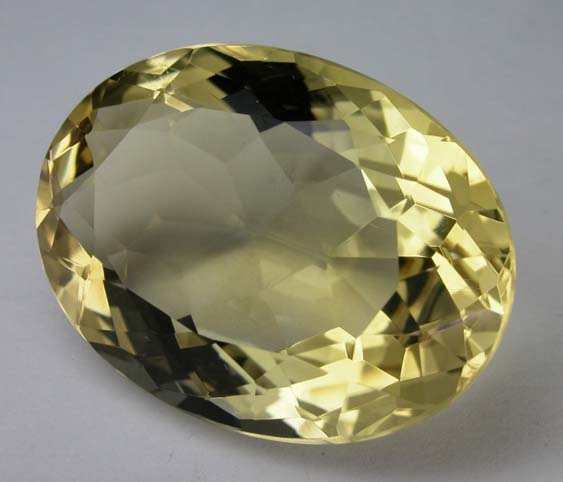
- Citrine, a deep golden yellowish variety of quartz

Colour coordinates
- Hex triplet: #E4D00A
- sRGB^{B} (r, g, b): (228, 208, 10)
- HSV (h, s, v): (54°, 96%, 89%)
- CIELCh_{uv} (L, C, h): (83, 91, 77°)
- Source: /Maerz and Paul
- ISCC–NBS descriptor: Vivid greenish yellow
- B: Normalized to [0–255] (byte)

Citrine /ˈsɪtriːn/ is a colour, the most common reference for which is certain coloured varieties of quartz which are a medium deep shade of golden yellow. Citrine has been summarized at various times as yellow, greenish-yellow, brownish yellow or orange.

The original reference point for the citrine colour was the citron fruit. The first recorded use of citrine as a colour in English was in 1386. It was borrowed from a medieval Latin and classical Latin word with the same meaning. In late medieval and early modern English the citrine colour-name was applied in a wider variety of contexts than it is today and could be "reddish or brownish yellow; or orange; or amber (distinguished from yellow)".

In today's English citrine as a colour is mostly confined to the contexts of (1) gemstones, including quartz, and (2) some animal and plant names. E.g., the citrine wagtail (Motacilla citreola), an Asian bird species with golden-yellow plumage, or the citrine warbler, citrine canary-flycatcher, citrine forktail, etc.

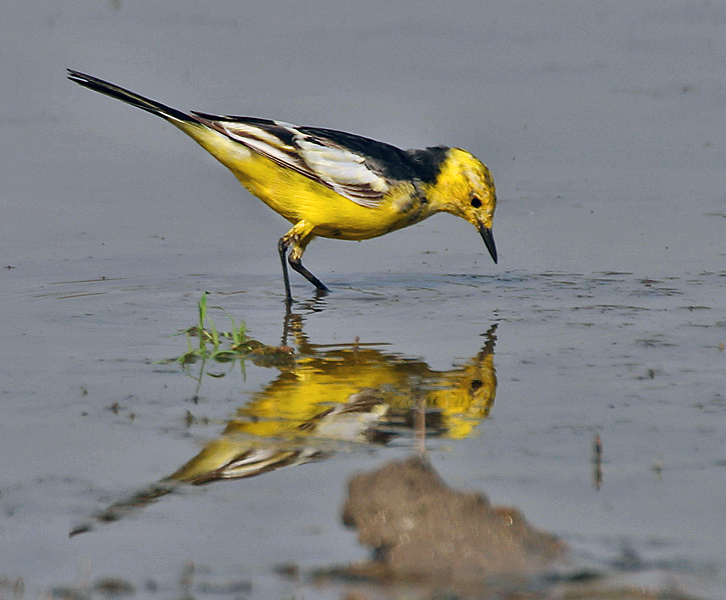
Citrine wagtail

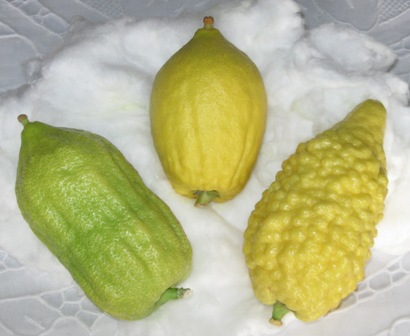
The citron fruit is historically the source-word for the citrine colour name, beginning in Latin

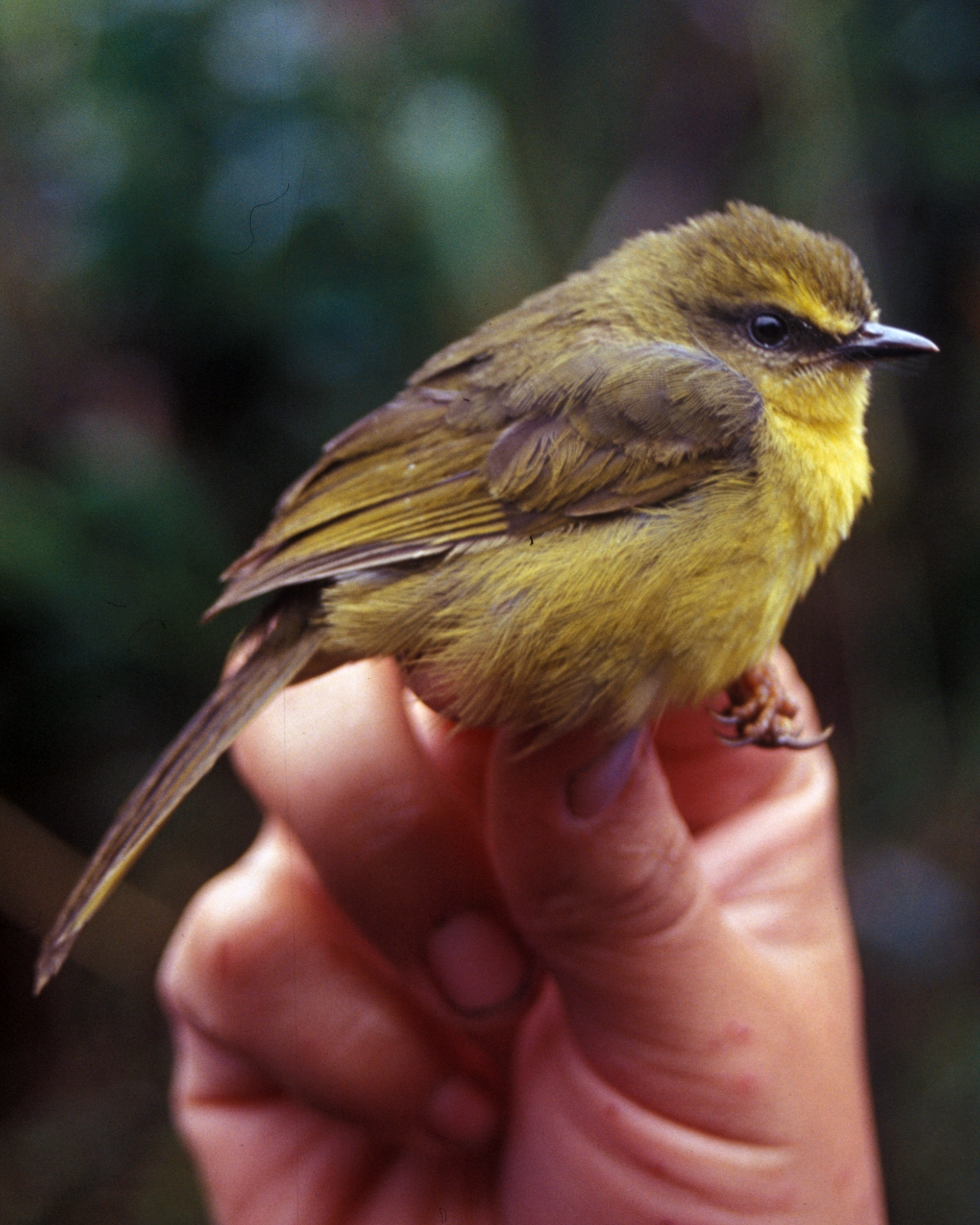
Citrine warbler

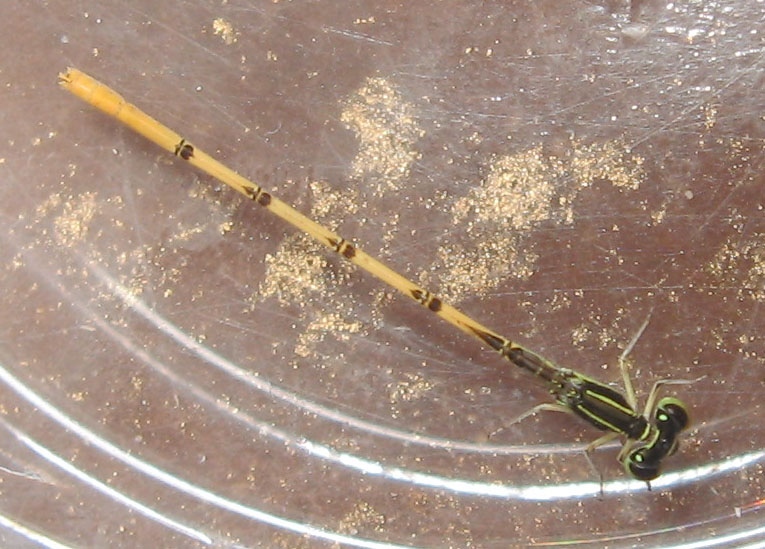
Citrine forktail

== See also ==
- List of colours
