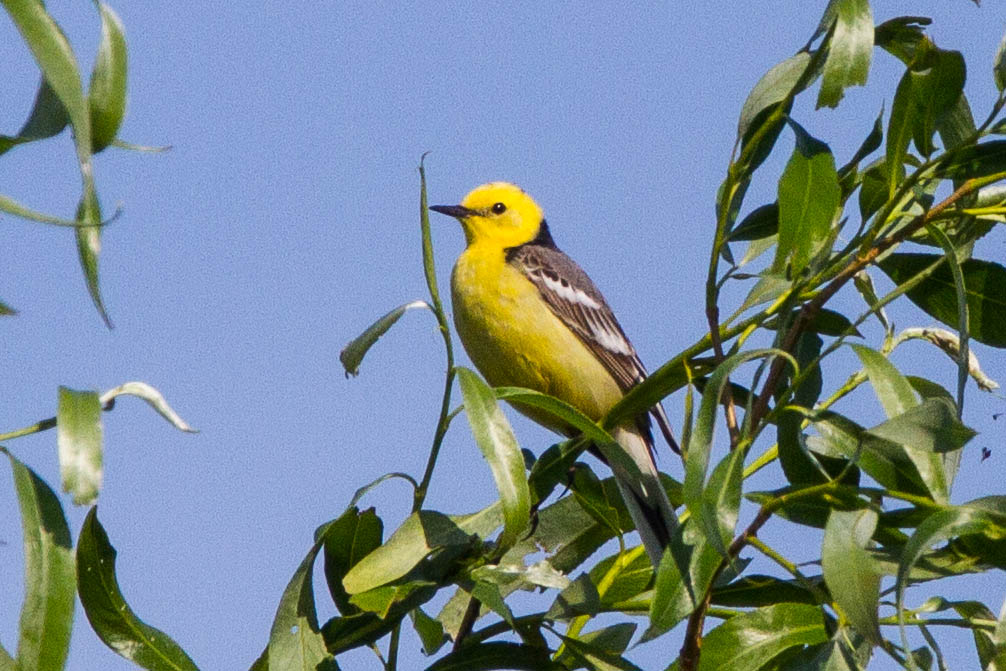

Conservation status
- Least Concern (IUCN 3.1)

Scientific classification
- Kingdom: Animalia
- Phylum: Chordata
- Class: Aves
- Order: Passeriformes
- Family: Motacillidae
- Genus: Motacilla
- Species: M. citreola

Binomial name
- Motacilla citreola Pallas, 1776
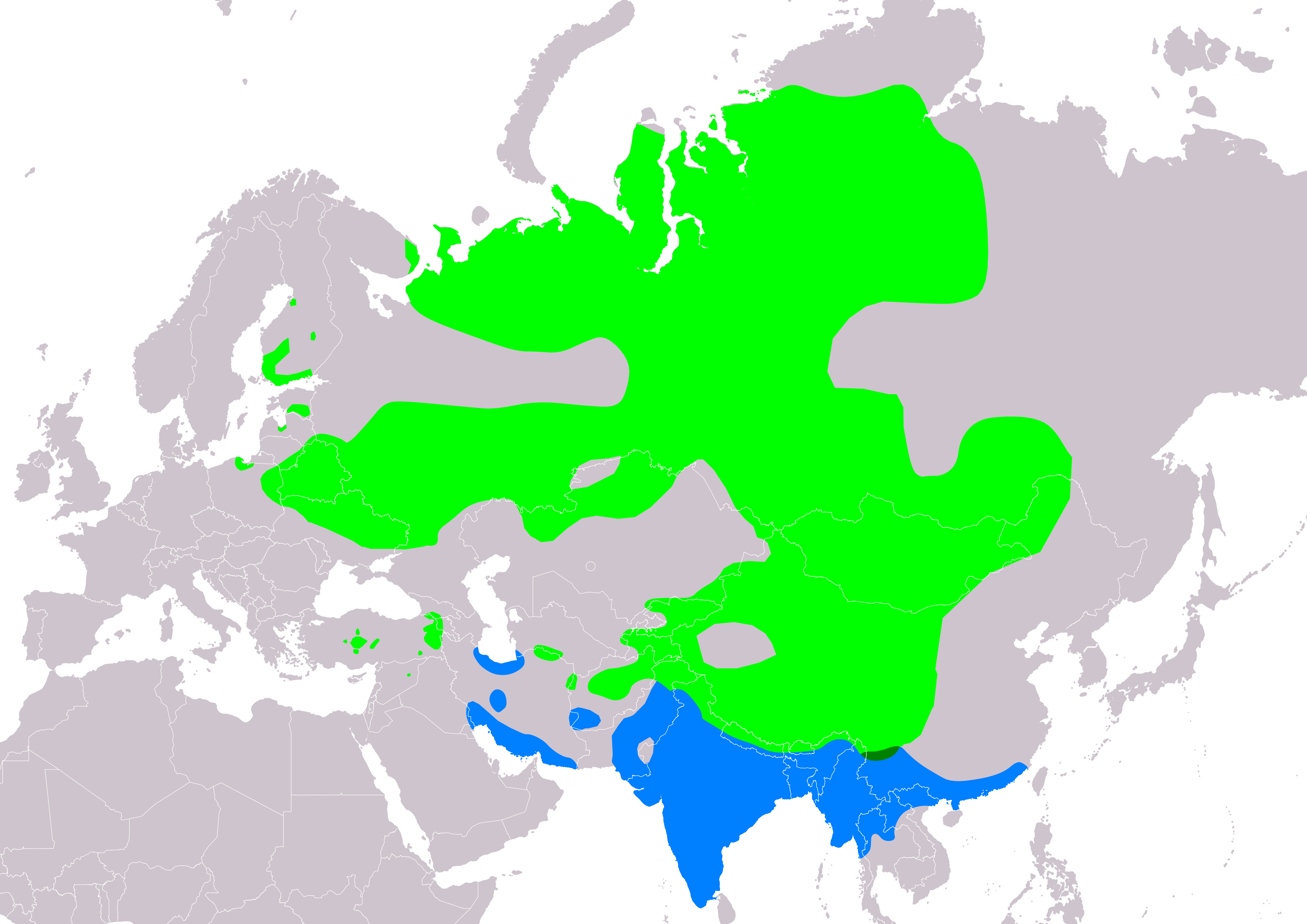
- Range of M. citreola Breeding Resident Non-breeding

Synonyms
- Budytes citreola (Pallas, 1776)

= Citrine wagtail =

Species of bird

The citrine wagtail (Motacilla citreola) is a small songbird in the family Motacillidae.

== Etymology ==
The term citrine, and the specific name citreola, refer to its yellowish colouration.

== Taxonomy ==
Its systematics, phylogeny and taxonomy are subject of considerable debate in the early 21st century. This is because this bird forms a cryptic species complex with the eastern (M. tschutschensis ) and western yellow wagtail (M. flava). Which of the many taxa in this group should properly refer to which population is unlikely to be resolved in the immediate future.

Motacilla is the Latin name for the pied wagtail; although actually a diminutive of motare, " to move about", from medieval times it led to the misunderstanding of cilla as "tail". The specific citreola is Latin for "lemon yellow".

== Description ==
It is a slender, 15.5–17 cm long bird, with the long, constantly wagging tail characteristic of the genus Motacilla. The adult male in breeding plumage is basically grey or black above, with white on the remiges, and bright yellow below and on the entire head except for the black nape. In winter plumage, its yellow underparts may be diluted by white, and the head is brownish with a yellowish supercilium. Females look generally like washed-out versions of males in winter plumage.

== Distribution ==
This species breeds in the central Palearctic in wet meadows and tundra. It migrates in winter to South Asia, often to highland areas. Its range is expanding westwards, and it is a rare but increasing vagrant to western Europe. Vagrants seem to extend the migration rather than straying en route; in Bhutan, for example, though along one of the species' migration flyways, the citrine wagtail has been recorded as an extremely rare passer-by rather than staying even for a few days or weeks.

== Ecology ==
It is an insectivorous bird of open country near water, such as wet meadows and bogs, and nests on the ground, laying 4–5 speckled eggs.

== Gallery ==
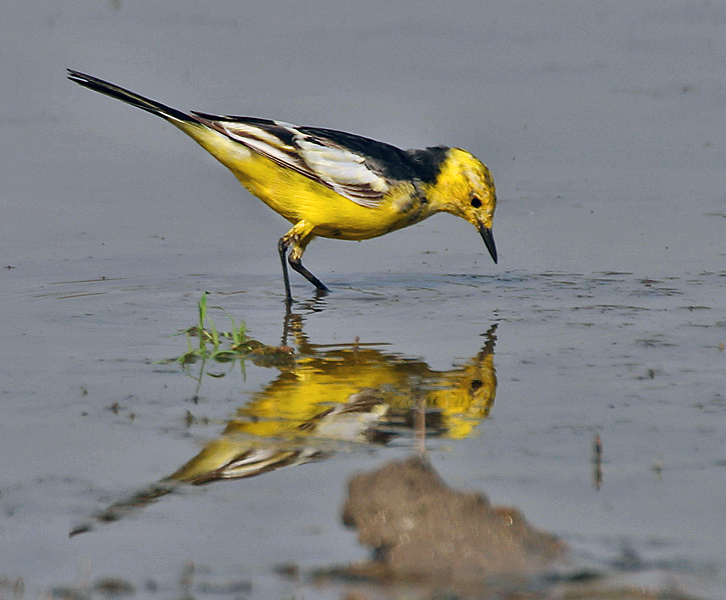
Male Weigold's citrine wagtail (M. c. calcarata) in breeding plumage. Keoladeo National Park, India.

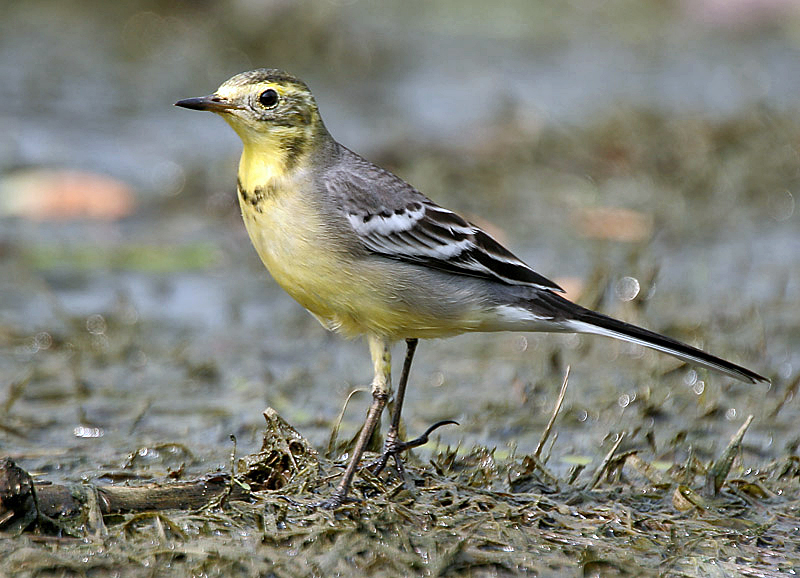
Female in breeding plumage, Narenderpur near Kolkata (West Bengal, India)

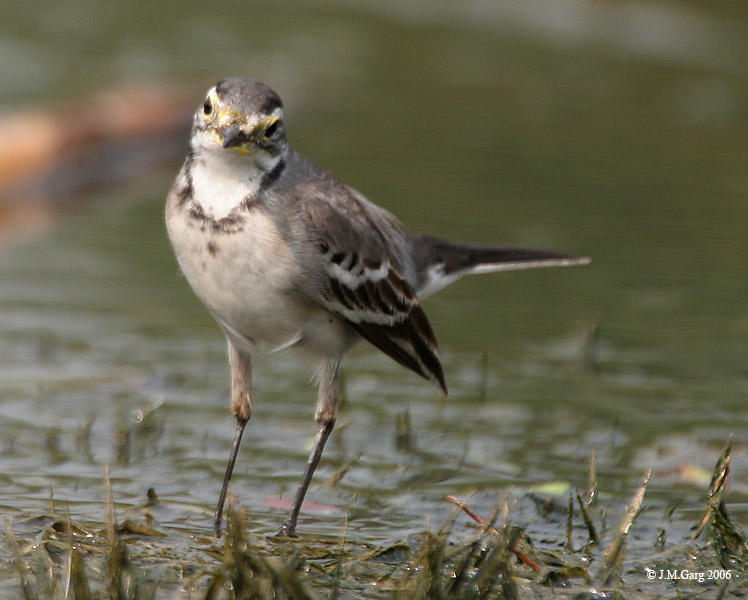
Juvenile in Kolkata (West Bengal, India)

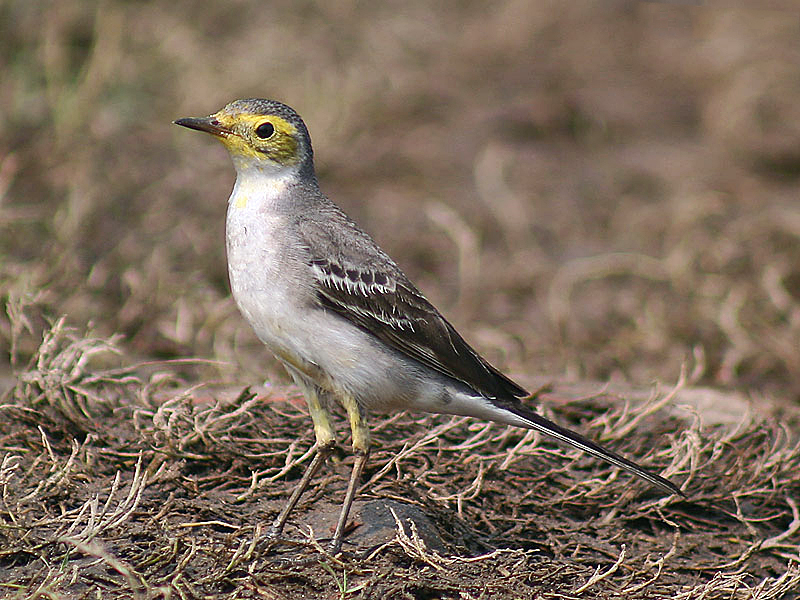
Immature in first-winter plumage
Joka, Kolkata (West Bengal, India)

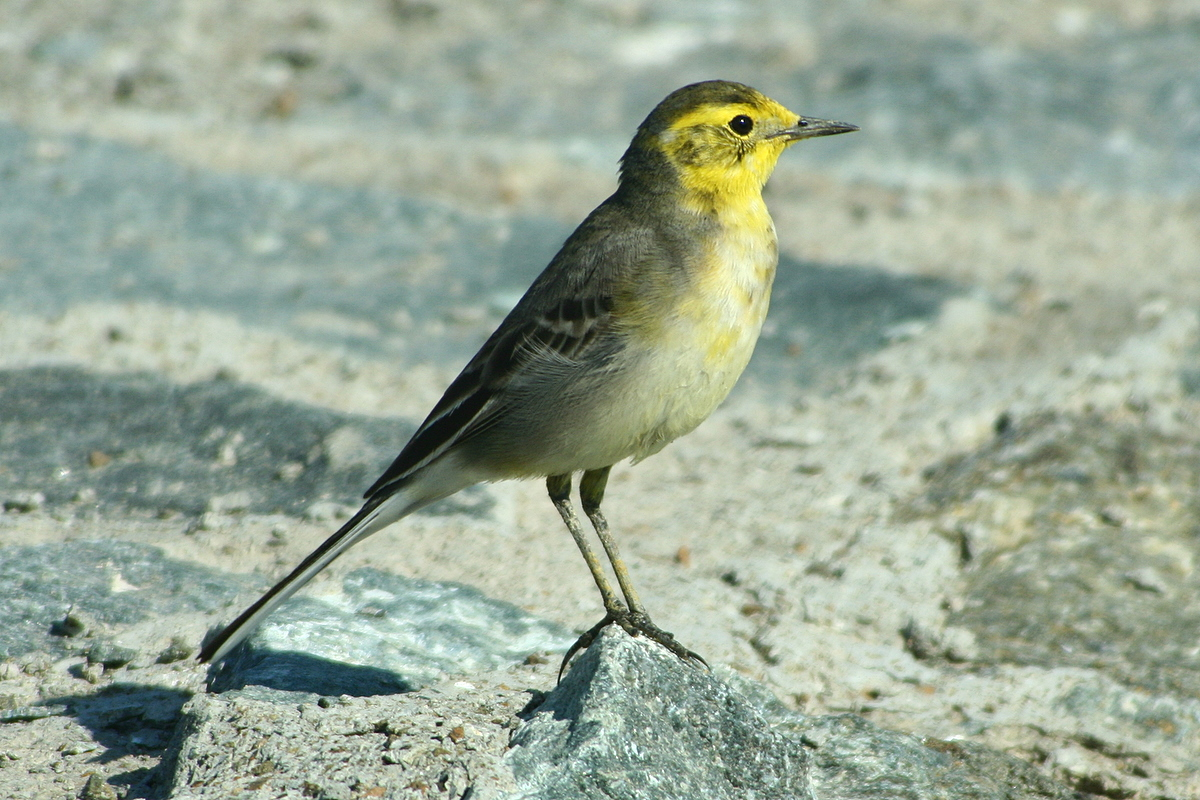
Wintering bird in Ras al Khor Bird Sanctuary (Dubai, UAE)

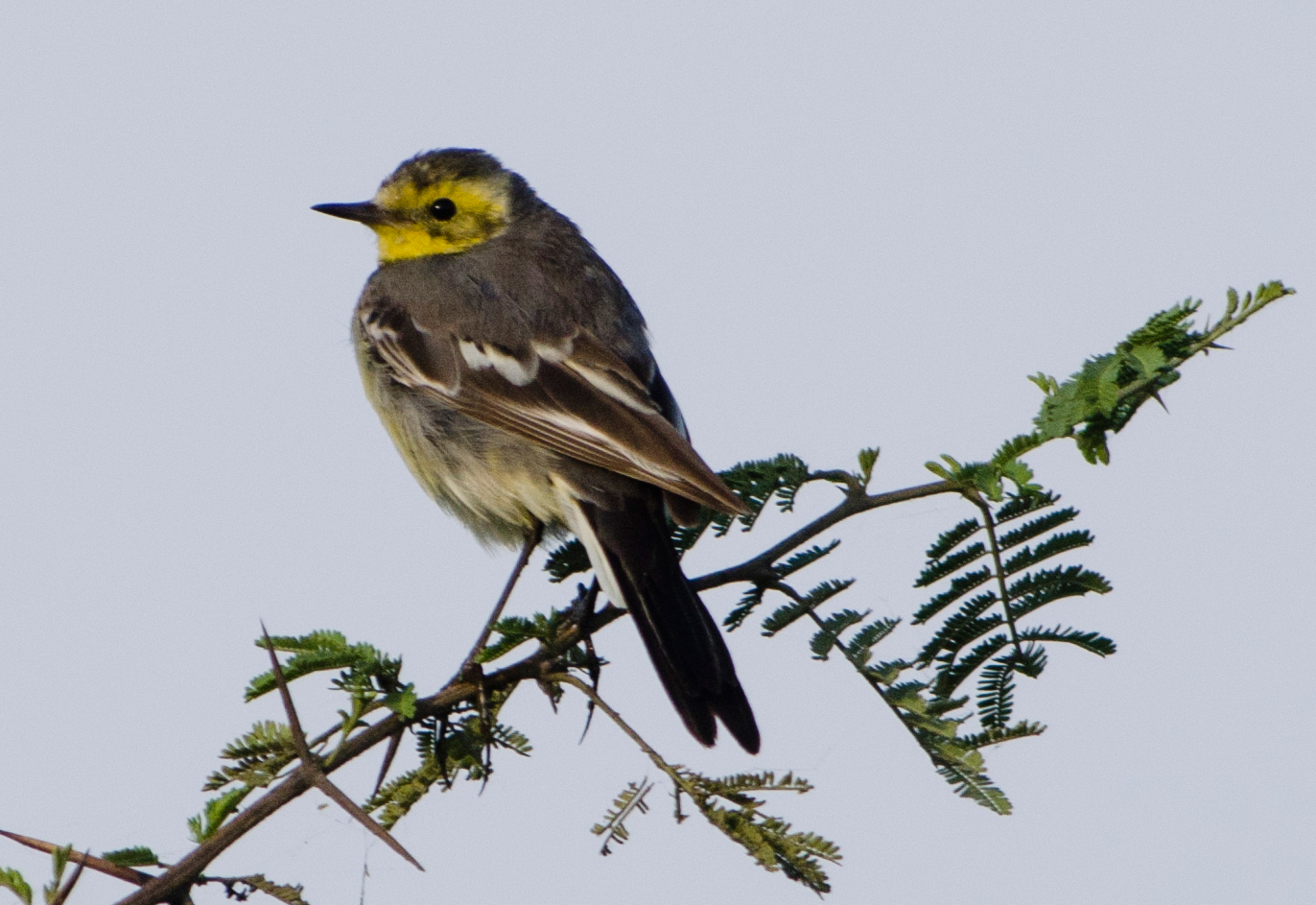
Citrine wagtail Motacilla citreola

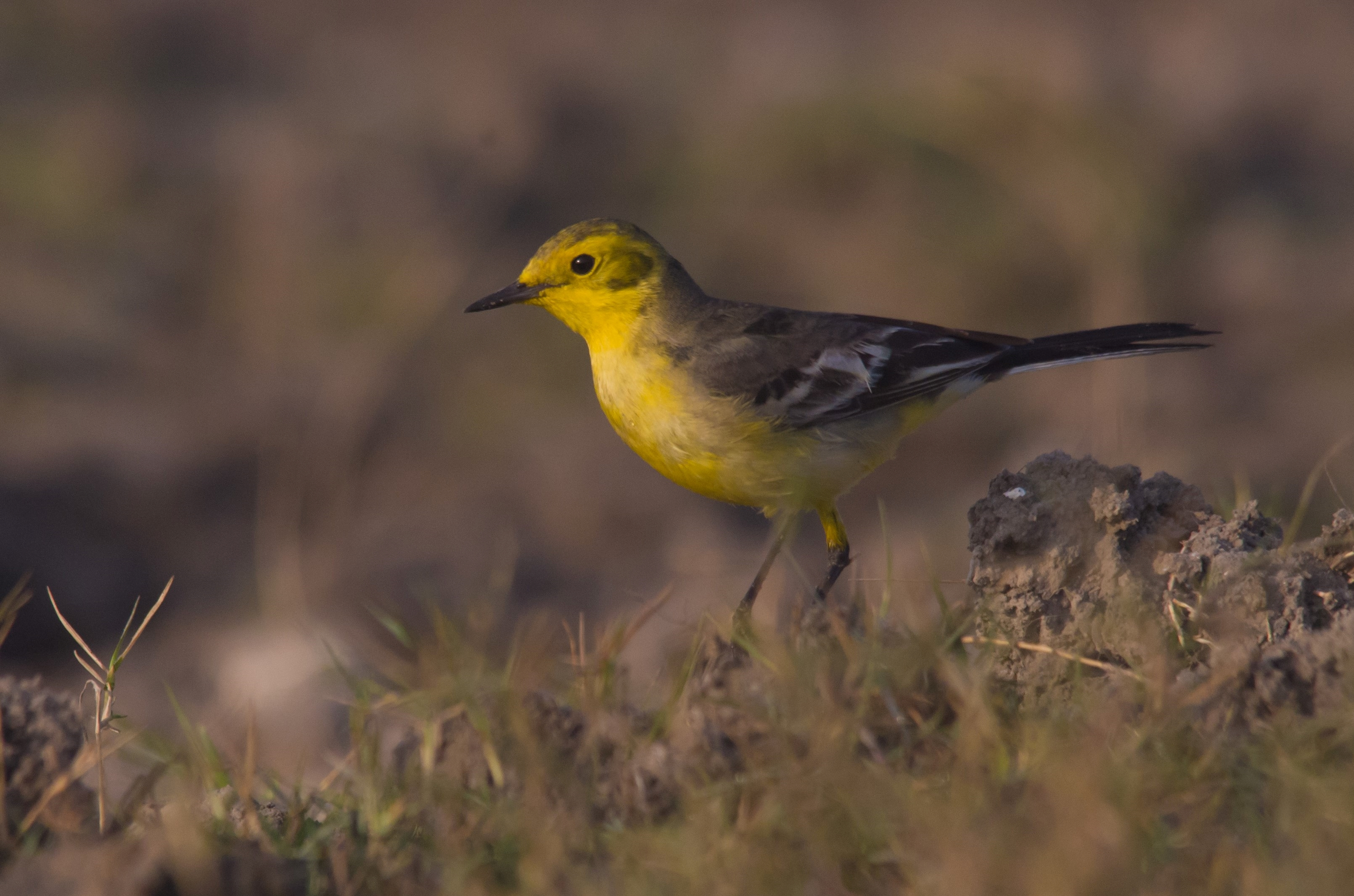
Citrine Wagtail at Nalsarovar Bird Sanctuary

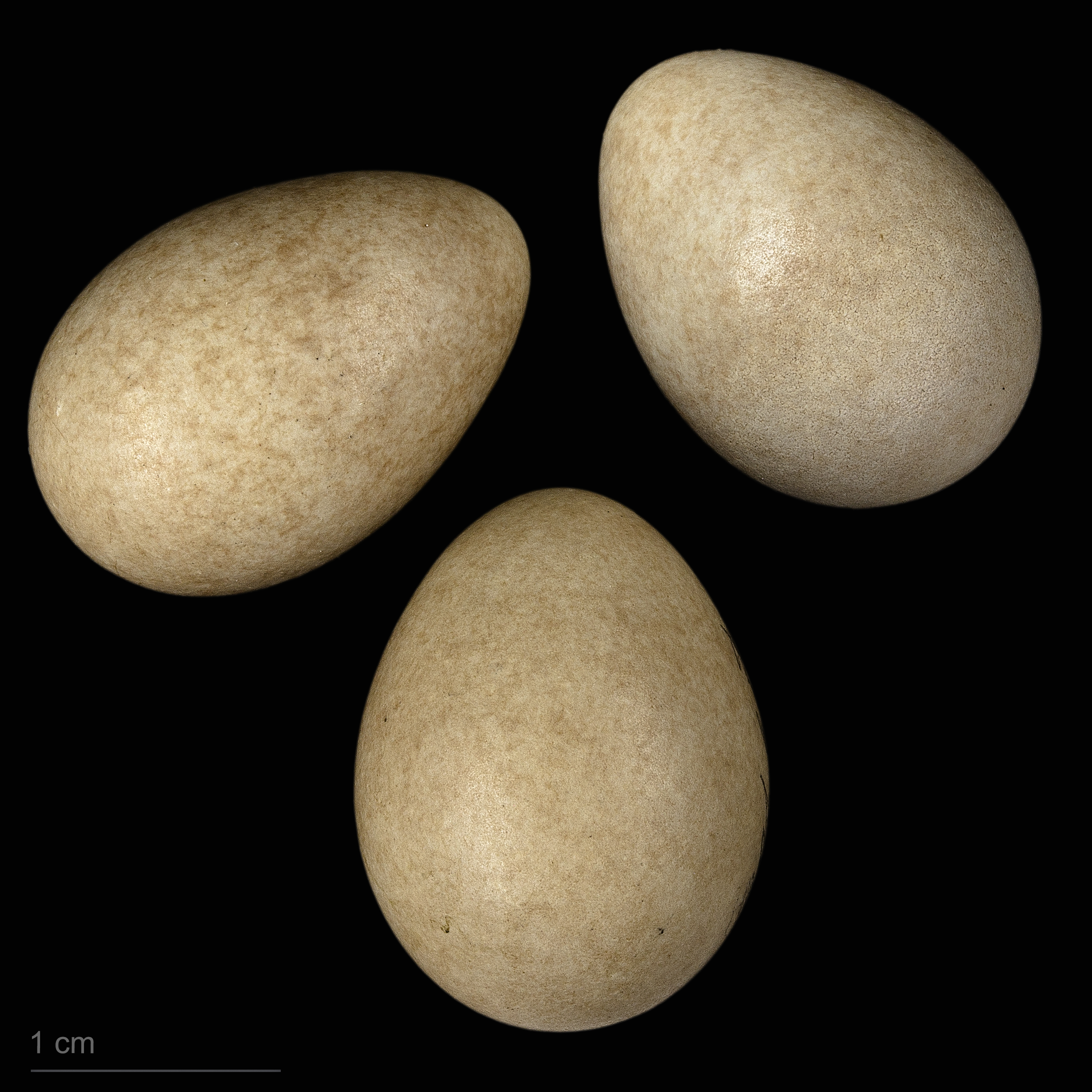
Motacilla citreola citreola - MHNT
