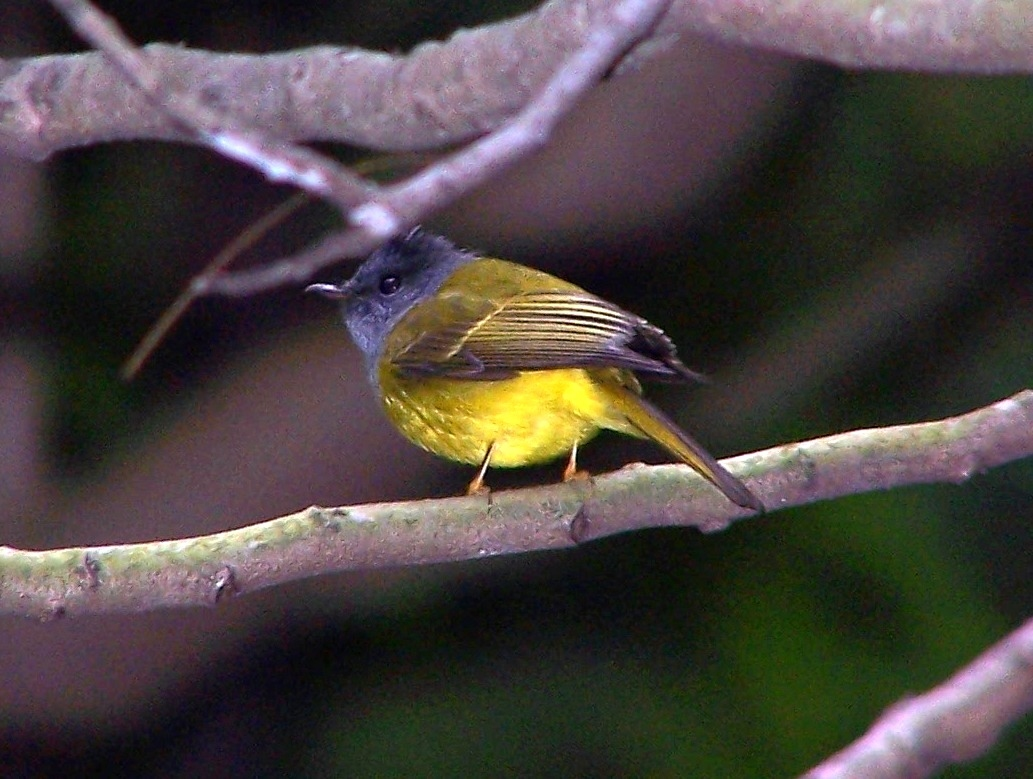
- Grey-headed canary-flycatcher (Culicicapa ceylonensis)

Scientific classification
- Kingdom: Animalia
- Phylum: Chordata
- Class: Aves
- Order: Passeriformes
- Family: Stenostiridae
- Genus: Culicicapa; R. Swinhoe, 1871

Type species
- Platyrhynchus ceylonensis Swainson, 1820

Species
- See text

= Canary-flycatcher =

Genus of birds

The canary-flycatchers (Culicicapa) are a genus of birds in the family Stenostiridae. The genus was erected by Robert Swinhoe in 1871. It is restricted to Southeast Asia. Canary-flycatchers have a fine-tipped bill which becomes broad and flat at the base. The sexes are indistinguishable in plumage. Young birds are neither spotted nor streaked.

There are two species:

Image	Common name	Scientific name	Distribution
	Grey-headed canary-flycatcher	Culicicapa ceylonensis	Tropical Asia, from Pakistan, Central India, Bangladesh, and Sri Lanka east to Indonesia and southern China.
	Citrine canary-flycatcher	Culicicapa helianthea	Sulawesi and the Philippines.
