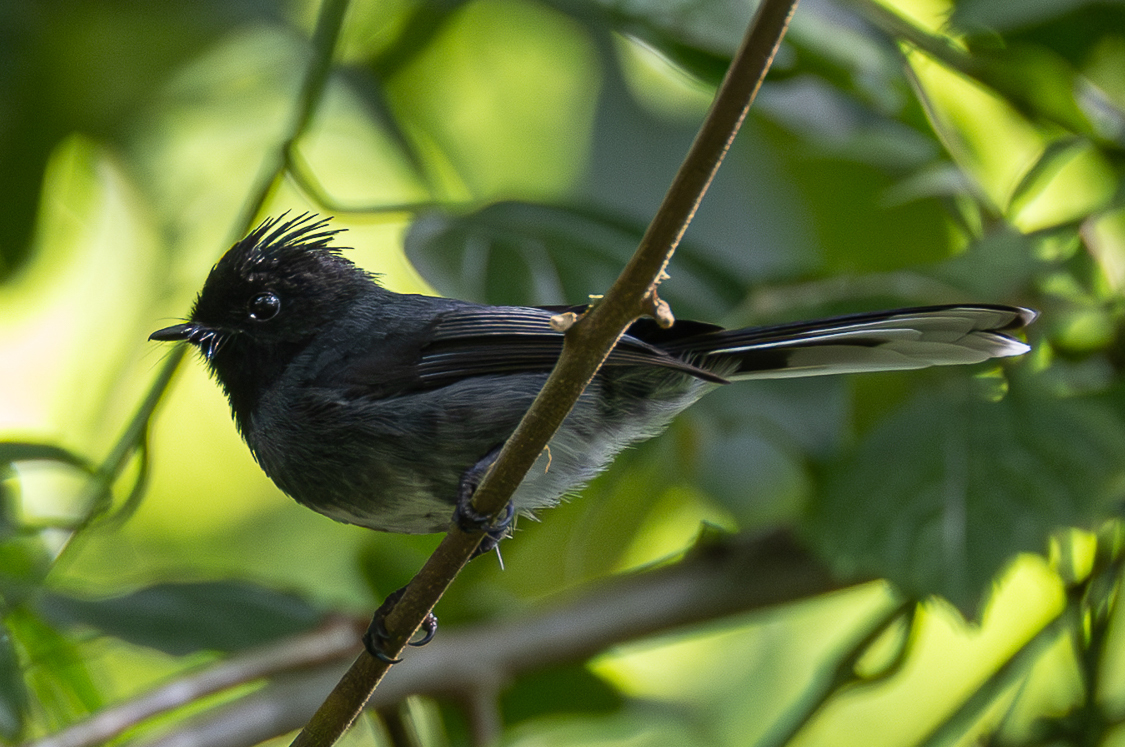

Conservation status
- Least Concern (IUCN 3.1)

Scientific classification
- Kingdom: Animalia
- Phylum: Chordata
- Class: Aves
- Order: Passeriformes
- Family: Stenostiridae
- Genus: Elminia
- Species: E. albiventris

Binomial name
- Elminia albiventris (Sjöstedt, 1893)
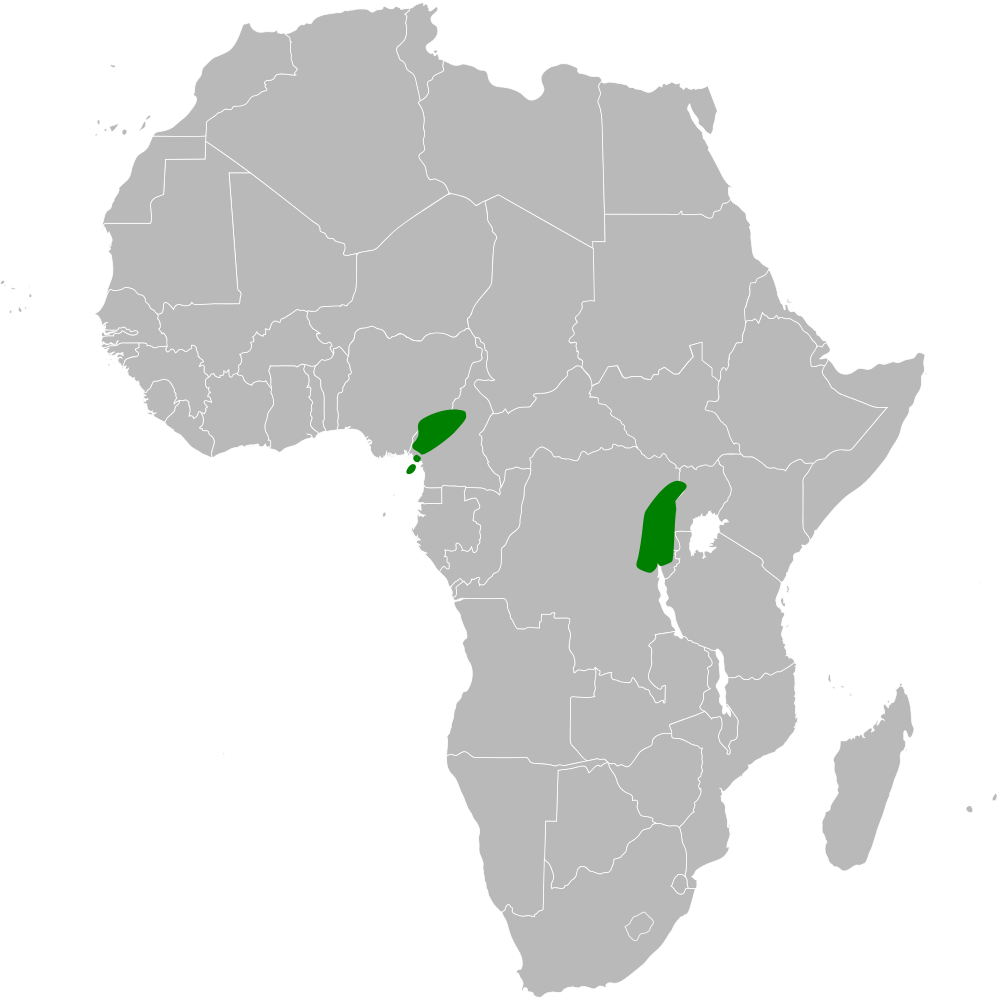

= White-bellied crested flycatcher =

Species of bird

The white-bellied crested flycatcher (Elminia albiventris) is a bird species in the family Stenostiridae; it was formerly placed with the drongos in the Dicruridae.

It is native to the Western High Plateau, Bioko and the Albertine Rift montane forests.
