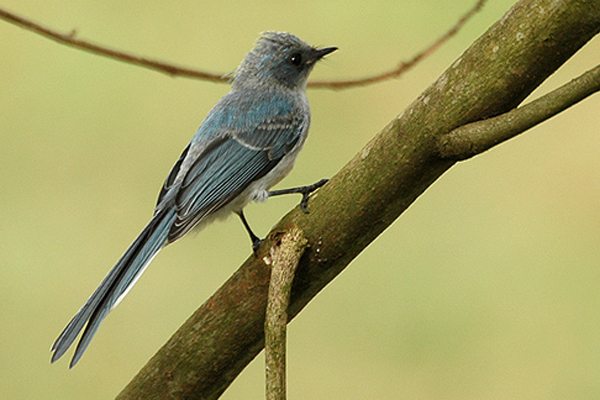

Conservation status
- Least Concern (IUCN 3.1)

Scientific classification
- Kingdom: Animalia
- Phylum: Chordata
- Class: Aves
- Order: Passeriformes
- Family: Stenostiridae
- Genus: Elminia
- Species: E. albicauda

Binomial name
- Elminia albicauda Barboza du Bocage, 1877

= White-tailed blue flycatcher =

Species of bird

The white-tailed blue flycatcher (Elminia albicauda) is a species of bird in the family Stenostiridae. It is found in Angola, Burundi, Democratic Republic of the Congo, Malawi, Mozambique, Rwanda, Tanzania, Uganda, and Zambia.

Its natural habitats are subtropical or tropical dry forest, subtropical or tropical moist lowland forest, and dry savanna.

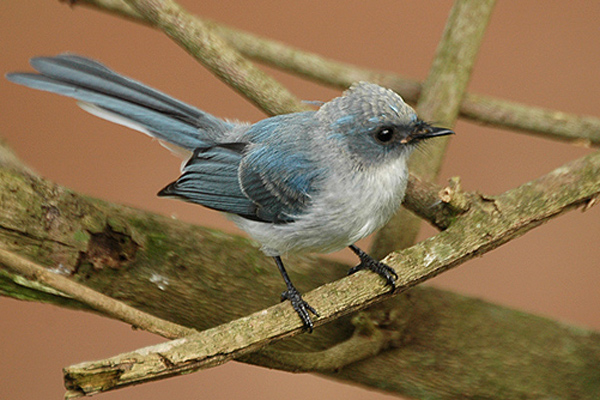
White-tailed blue flycatcher in Bwindi, Uganda
