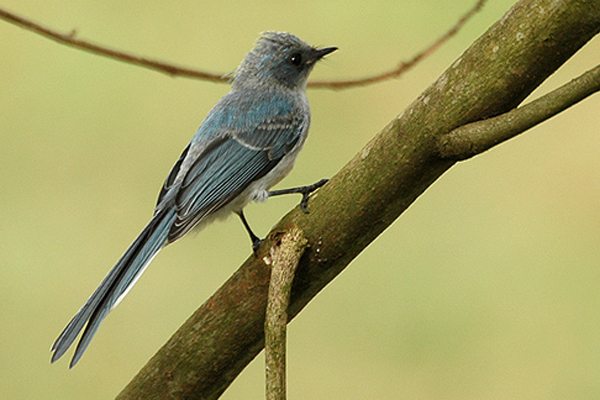
- White-tailed blue flycatcher (Elminia albicauda)

Scientific classification
- Kingdom: Animalia
- Phylum: Chordata
- Class: Aves
- Order: Passeriformes
- Family: Stenostiridae
- Genus: Elminia; Bonaparte, 1854

Type species
- Myiagra longicauda Swainson, 1838
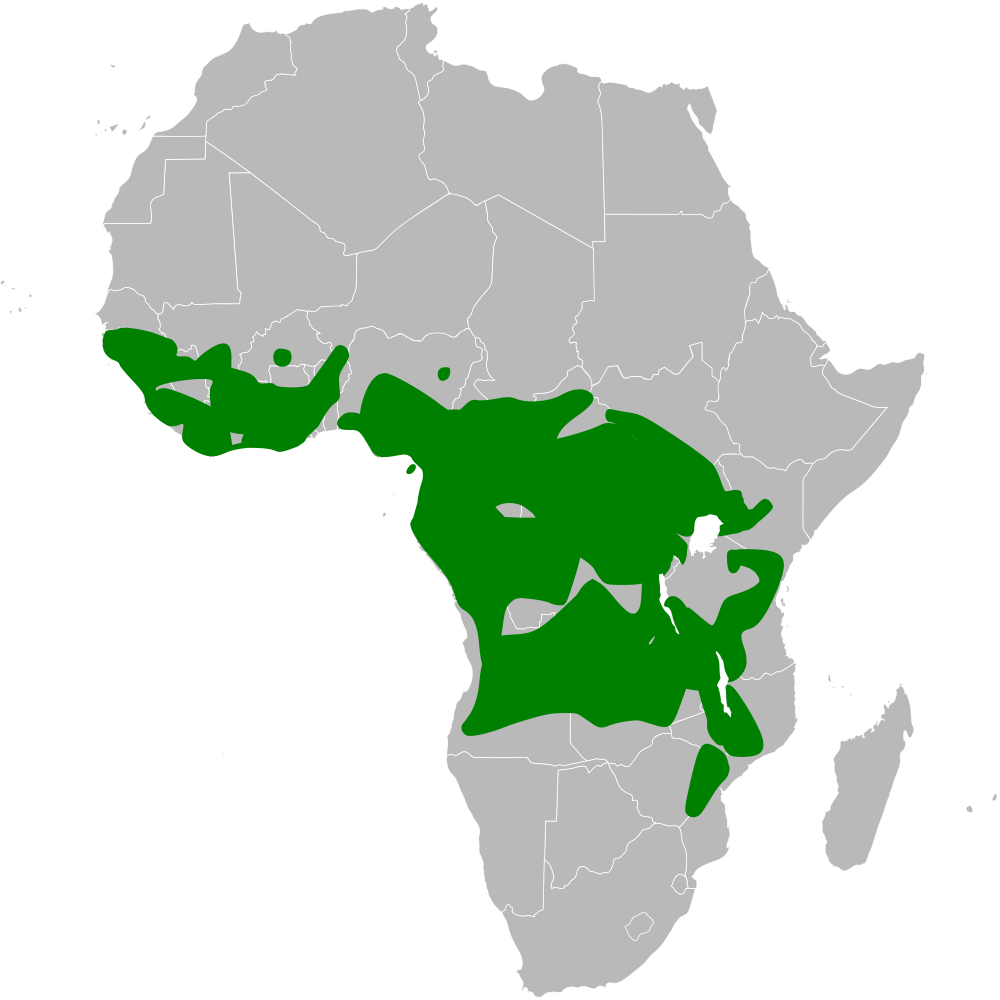

= Elminia =

Genus of birds

Elminia is a genus of bird in the flycatcher family Stenostiridae. The genus is endemic to Africa. It contains the following species:

Image	Common name	Scientific name	Distribution
	African blue flycatcher	Elminia longicauda	Mauritania, Senegal, and Gambia east discontinuously to Kenya and south through the eastern Democratic Republic of Congo to northern Angola.
	White-tailed blue flycatcher	Elminia albicauda	Angola, Burundi, Democratic Republic of the Congo, Malawi, Mozambique, Rwanda, Tanzania, Uganda, and Zambia.
	White-bellied crested flycatcher	Elminia albiventris	Western High Plateau, Bioko, and the Albertine Rift montane forests.
	White-tailed crested flycatcher	Elminia albonotata	Discontinuous distribution in eastern Africa.
	Dusky crested flycatcher	Elminia nigromitrata	Widespread across the African tropical rainforest.
