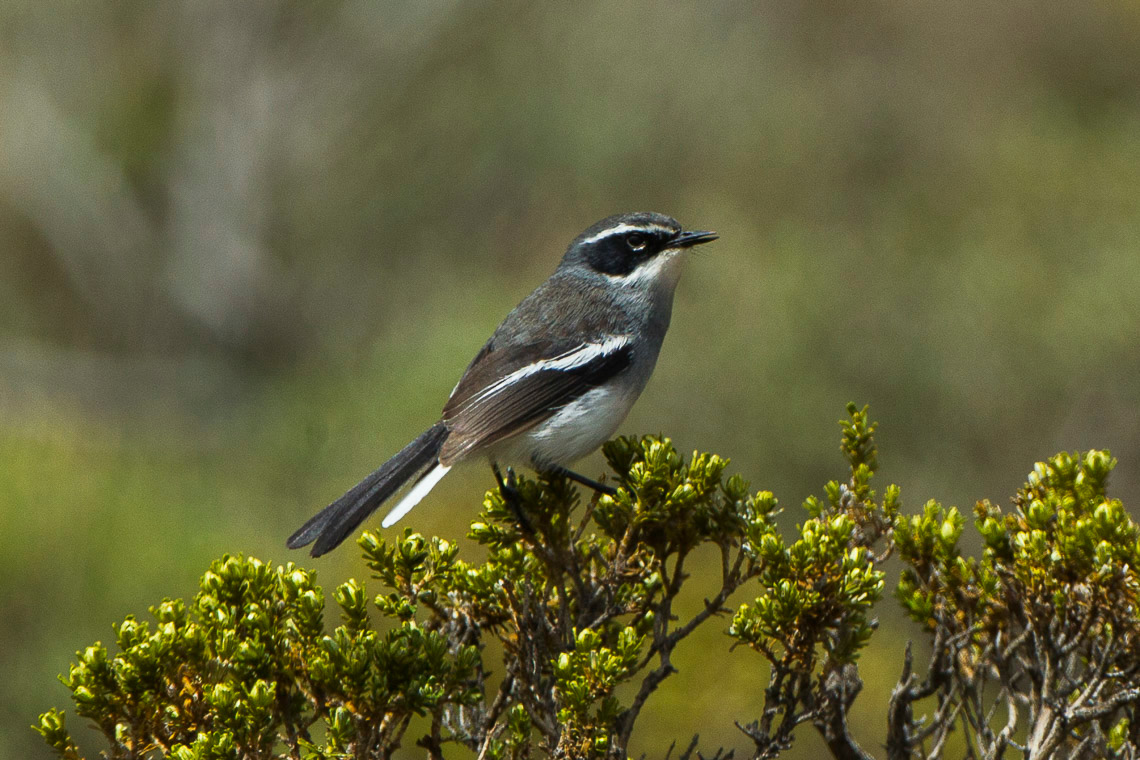

Conservation status
- Least Concern (IUCN 3.1)

Scientific classification
- Kingdom: Animalia
- Phylum: Chordata
- Class: Aves
- Order: Passeriformes
- Family: Stenostiridae
- Genus: Stenostira; Cabanis & Bonaparte, 1850
- Species: S. scita

Binomial name
- Stenostira scita (Vieillot, 1818)
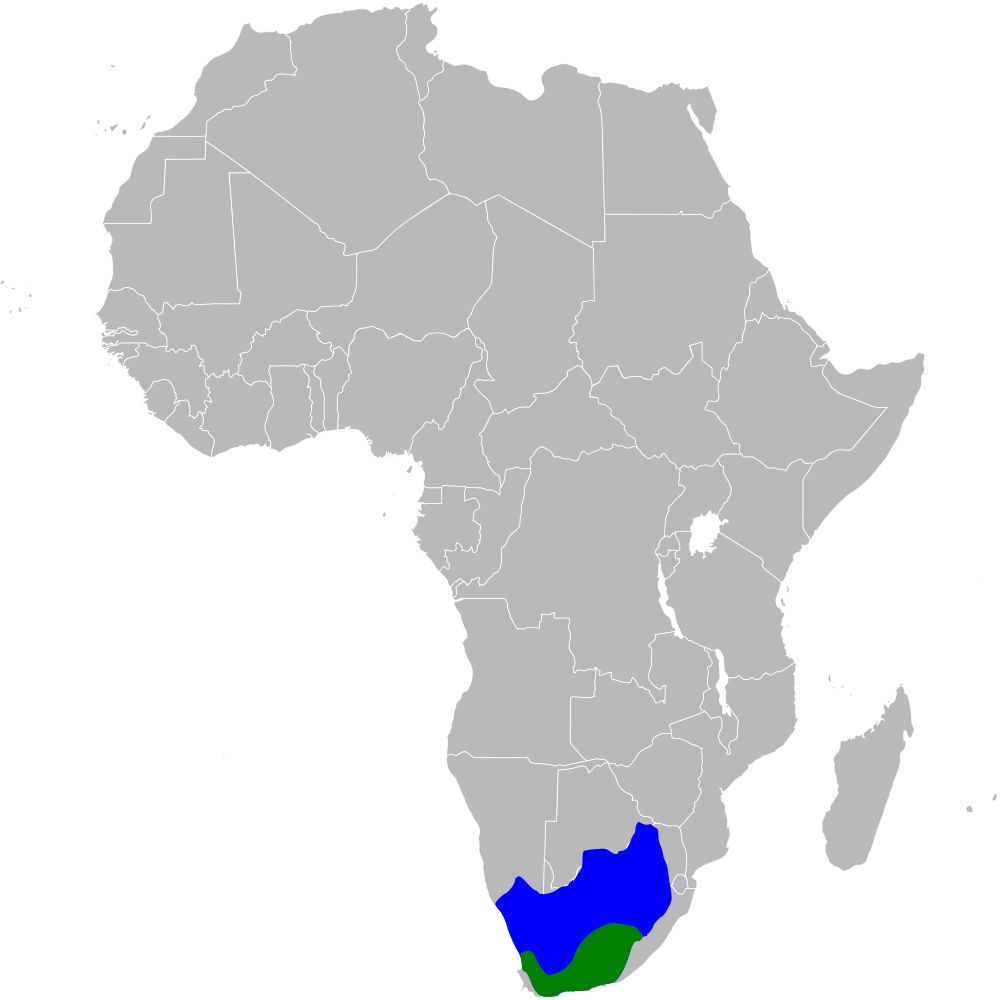
- Range map Resident year-round range Non-breeding winter visitor range

Synonyms
- Muscicapa scita Vieillot, 1818

= Fairy flycatcher =

Species of bird

The fairy flycatcher or fairy warbler (Stenostira scita) is a small passerine bird. Formerly placed in the Old World flycatcher family, Muscicapidae, it is now separated with some other "odd flycatchers" as the new family Stenostiridae (Beresford et al. 2005, Fuchs et al. 2006). It is the only member of the genus Stenostira.

It is an endemic resident breeder in southern Africa in Botswana, South Africa, Lesotho and Namibia, and a vagrant to Zimbabwe and Eswatini.

Stenostira scita is a common seasonal migrant, breeding in karoo scrub and fynbos in the southern highlands, and migrating north in to spend the southern winter in thorn scrub at lower altitudes.

== Description ==
The fairy flycatcher is 11–12 cm in length. The adult is pale grey above with a black mask through the eye and a white supercilium. The wings are black with a long white stripe, and the long black tail has white sides. The throat is white, the breast is pale grey, and the belly is white with a pinkish-grey wash to its centre. The sexes are alike, but the juvenile is browner than the adult. The eye is brown and the bill and legs are black.

== Behaviour ==
The fairy flycatcher is monogamous unless its mate dies, when it will seek a new partner. It builds an open cup nest from thin stems and other plant material and lined with plant down. It is placed in the branches of a tree or shrub but well concealed. The female lays two or three green eggs.

This bird is usually seen alone, in pairs, or small flocks. It feeds on small insects and other invertebrates, foraging in the foliage like a warbler.
