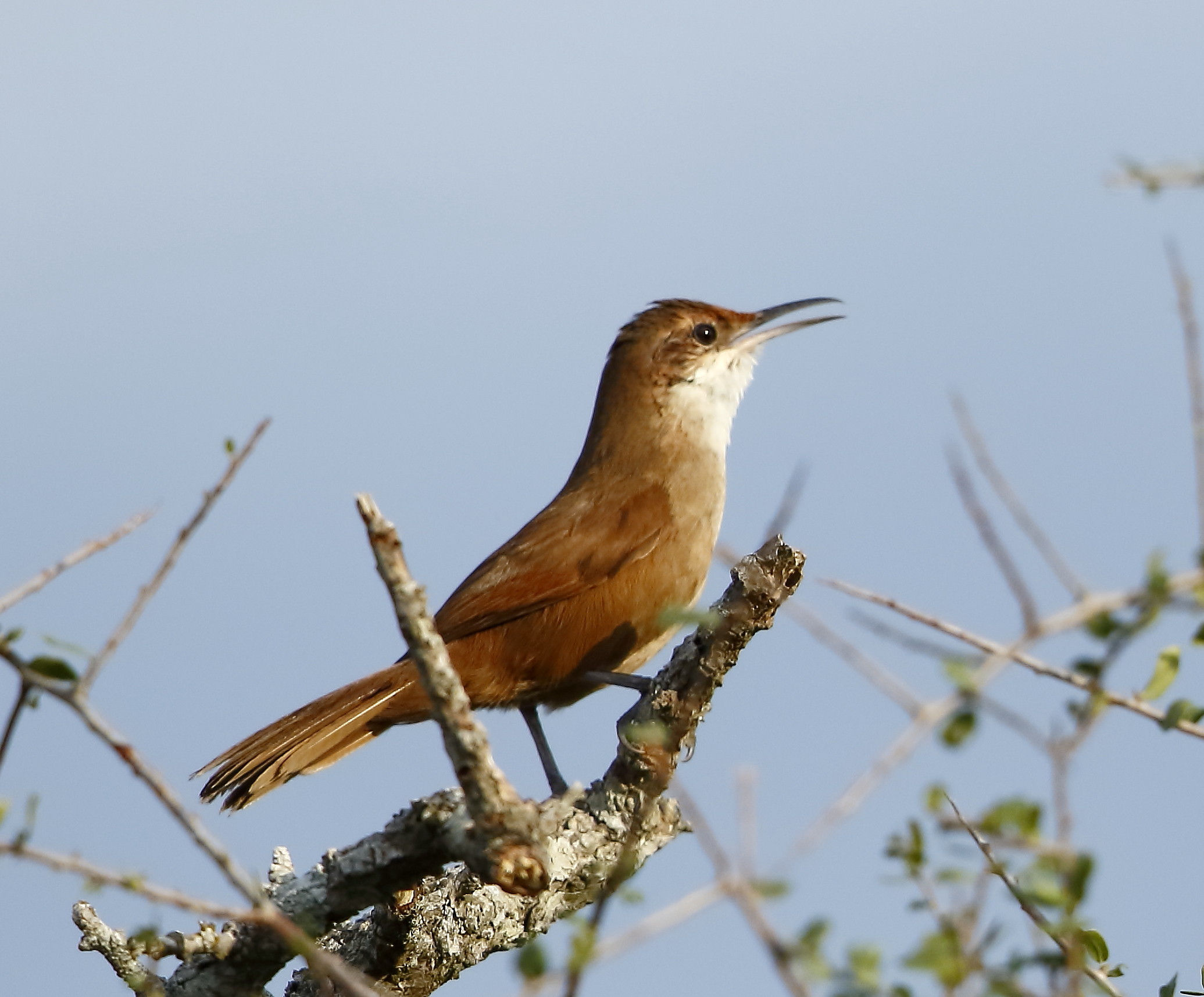
- at Capivara, Santa Fe, Argentina

Conservation status
- Least Concern (IUCN 3.1)

Scientific classification
- Kingdom: Animalia
- Phylum: Chordata
- Class: Aves
- Order: Passeriformes
- Family: Furnariidae
- Genus: Tarphonomus
- Species: T. certhioides

Binomial name
- Tarphonomus certhioides (d'Orbigny & Lafresnaye, 1838)

Synonyms
- Ochetorhynchus certhioides Upucerthia certhioides

= Chaco earthcreeper =

Species of bird

The Chaco earthcreeper (Tarphonomus certhioides) is a species of bird in the Furnariinae subfamily of the ovenbird family Furnariidae. It is found in Argentina, Bolivia, and Paraguay, and as a vagrant in Brazil.

== Taxonomy and systematics ==
The Chaco earthcreeper has at times been placed in genera Ochetorhynchus and Upucerthia but since the early 2000s has been placed in its current Tarphonomus. It has at times been considered conspecific with the other member of Tarphonomus, the Bolivian earthcreeper (T. harterti). The two of them are sisters to the rusty-winged barbtail (Premnornis guttuliger), and these three are in turn sisters to the tuftedcheeks of genus Pseudocolaptes.

The Chaco earthcreeper has three subspecies, the nominate T. c. certhoides (d'Orbigny & Lafresnaye, 1838), T. c. luscinia (Burmeister, 1860), and T. c. estebani (Wetmore & Peters, JL, 1949).

== Description ==
The Chaco earthcreeper is about 16 cm (6.3 in) long and weighs 18 to 31 g (0.63 to 1.09 oz). It is a small earthcreeper with a long and very slightly decurved bill. The sexes' plumages are alike. Adults of the nominate subspecies have an indistinct orange-rufous supercilium on a mostly dark brown face. Their forehead is dull orange-rufous, their crown and back dull dark brown, and their rump and uppertail coverts somewhat rufescent brown. Their tail is generally dull brown with progressively more rufous from the central to the outermost feathers. Their wings are slightly more rufous brown than the back with rufous bases on the flight feathers. Their throat and cheeks are white. Their breast and belly are brown and their flanks and undertail coverts rufescent. Their iris is brown, their maxilla blackish to dark gray, their mandible slate gray to pinkish gray, and their legs and feet blackish to dark gray. Juveniles have an overall rufous tinge but their forehead is less rufous than adults'.

Subspecies T. c. luscinia has grayer (less rufescent) upperparts, more rufous on the wings, and paler underparts than the nominate. T. c. estebani has a paler back, a duller breast and belly, and no rufescent tinge on the flanks compared to the nominate.

== Distribution and habitat ==
Subspecies T. c. estebani of the Chaco earthcreeper is found in Santa Cruz Department in south central Bolivia, in northern Argentina, and in western Paraguay. T. c. luscinia is found in the western Argentina provinces of San Juan, La Rioja, Córdoba, Mendoza, and San Luis. The nominate T. c. certhoides is found in northeastern Argentina from Río Negro Province north to Formosa Province. It has also occurred once in Rio Grande do Sul, Brazil.

Subspecies T. c. estebani and T. c. certhoides of the Chaco earthcreeper inhabit dense scrublands and deciduous woodland in the Chaco Basin, especially areas with terrestrial bromeliads. T. c. luscinia inhabits slopes with dense shrubs in the Andean foothills. In elevation the species occurs up to 1,800 m (5,900 ft).

== Behavior ==
=== Movement ===
The Chaco earthcreeper is a year-round resident throughout its range.

=== Feeding ===
The Chaco earthcreeper feeds on arthropods. It usually forages alone, gleaning prey from the ground and possibly from low vegetation.

=== Breeding ===
The Chaco earthcreeper breeds during the austral summer. It is thought to be monogamous. It builds a stick nest in a bush or tree, in a cavity in a tree, rock face, or old building, or in an old nest of a Furnarius hornero. It pads the floor of the nest with softer material such as hair, grass, and other plant fibers. The clutch size is three or four eggs. The incubation period, time to fledging, and details of parental care are not known.

=== Vocalization ===
The Chaco earthcreeper's song is "a series of 5–15 loud, squeaky penetrating 'chiqui' notes that increase in intensity [and] descend in pitch". Its call is "a loud whistled 'tééoo' or 'tuéét' ".

== Status ==
The IUCN has assessed the Chaco earthcreeper as being of Least Concern. It has a large range, and though its population size is not known it is believed to be stable. No immediate threats have been identified. It is considered fairly common in most of its range and occurs in at least one protected area.
