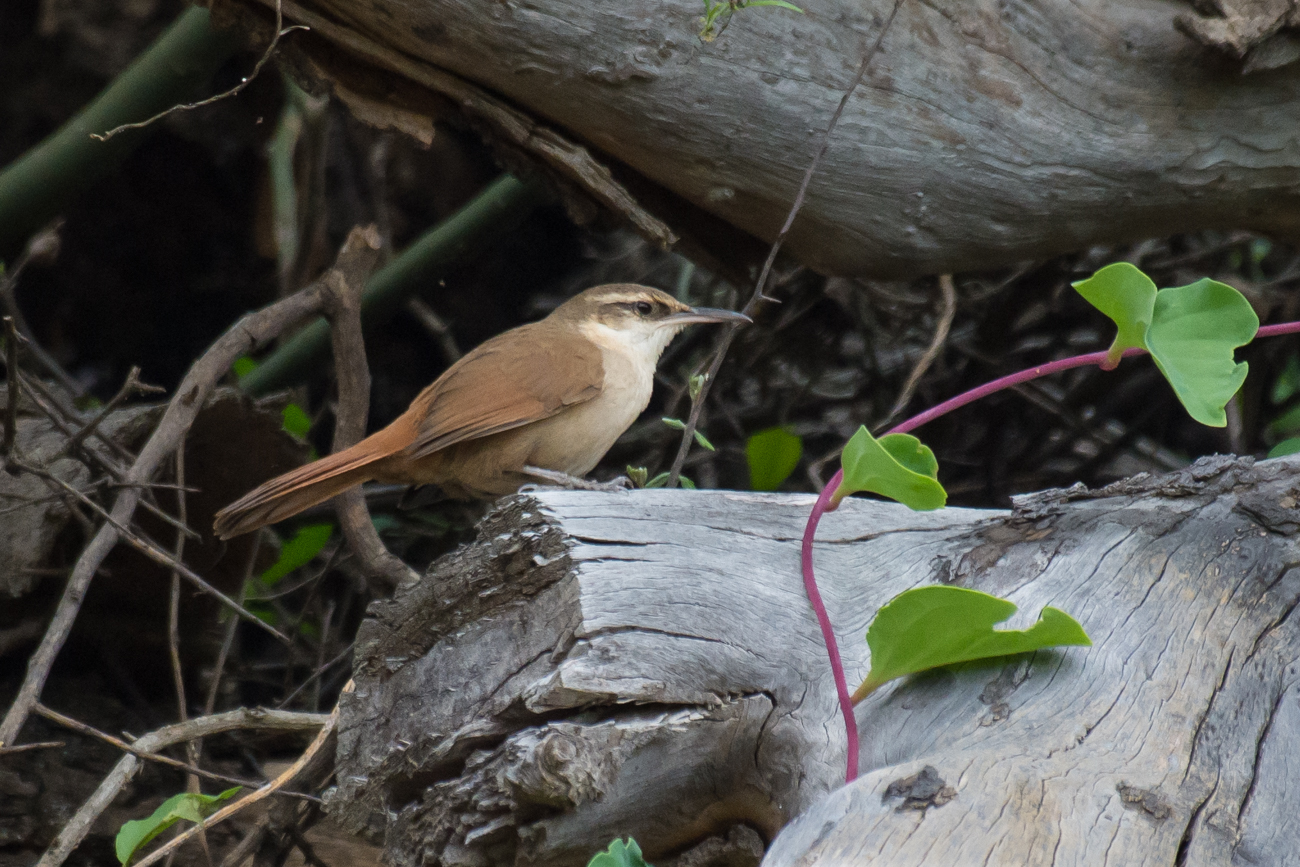

Conservation status
- Least Concern (IUCN 3.1)

Scientific classification
- Kingdom: Animalia
- Phylum: Chordata
- Class: Aves
- Order: Passeriformes
- Family: Furnariidae
- Genus: Tarphonomus
- Species: T. harterti

Binomial name
- Tarphonomus harterti (Berlepsch, 1892)

Synonyms
- Ochetorhynchus harterti Upucerthia harterti

= Bolivian earthcreeper =

Species of bird

Calls recorded in Santa Cruz, Bolivia

The Bolivian earthcreeper (Tarphonomus harterti) is a species of bird in the Furnariinae subfamily of the ovenbird family Furnariidae. It is found in Argentina and Bolivia.

== Taxononomy and systematics ==
The Bolivian earthcreeper has at times been placed in genera Ochetorhynchus and Upucerthia but since the early 2000s has been placed in its current Tarphonomus. It has at times been considered conspecific with the other member of Tarphonomus, the Chaco earthcreeper (T. certhioides). The two of them are sisters to the rusty-winged barbtail (Premnornis guttuliger), and these three are in turn sisters to the tuftedcheeks of genus Pseudocolaptes.

The Bolivian earthcreeper is monotypic.

== Description ==
The Bolivian earthcreeper is about 16 cm (6.3 in) long and weighs 22 to 26 g (0.78 to 0.92 oz). It is a small earthcreeper with a long and very slightly decurved bill. The sexes' plumages are alike. Adults have a wide buff supercilium on a mostly dark brownish face. Their crown is dark brown, their back and rump rich brown, and their uppertail coverts reddish brown. Most of their tail feathers have rufous-chestnut bases that blend to fuscous brown ends; the outermost pair are entirely rufous-chestnut. Their wings are rich brown with dark rufous bases on the flight feathers. Their throat and cheeks are white. Their breast and belly are pale cinnamon-buff, their flanks rufescent brown, and their undertail coverts dull rufous. Their iris is brown, their maxilla blackish, their mandible pale with a blackish tip, and their legs and feet brownish-olive or gray.

== Distribution and habitat ==
The Clements taxonomy places the Bolivian earthcreeper only in the Andes of the southern Bolivian departments of Cochabamba, Santa Cruz, and Chuquisaca. The IUCN also places it only in Bolivia. The International Ornithological Committee and the South American Classification Committee of the American Ornithological Society extend its range in northern Argentina.

The Bolivian earthcreeper inhabits arid montane scrublands that include short deciduous woodland. In elevation it ranges between 1,400 and 3,000 m (4,600 and 9,800 ft).

== Behavior ==
=== Movement ===
The Bolivian earthcreeper is a year-round resident throughout its range.

=== Feeding ===
The Bolivian earthcreeper's diet is almost entirely arthropods but it has also been recorded feeding on tiny molluscs. It usually forages alone as it gleans and probes for prey on the ground and in rock crevices.

=== Breeding ===
Nothing is known about the Bolivian earthcreeper's breeding biology, though it is assumed to nest during the austral summer.

=== Vocalization ===
The Bolivian earthcreeper's song is "a series of 7–15 loud, dry, clear, penetrating 'zeet' notes that increase in intensity, descend in pitch, ending in chatter". Its call is "a sharp 'bzeeeeeep' or 'dzyoot', repeated frequently". It also makes a "rodent-like, wheezy, piercing whistle, 'dzeea' ".

== Status ==
The IUCN has assessed the Bolivian Earthcreeper as being of Least Concern, though it has a somewhat limited range and an unknown population size that is believed to be decreasing. No immediate threats have been identified. It is considered uncommon. It is "subject to overgrazing and clearance for firewood possibly throughout its small geographical range. Nevertheless, this species appears to tolerate moderate to severe disturbance by humans."
