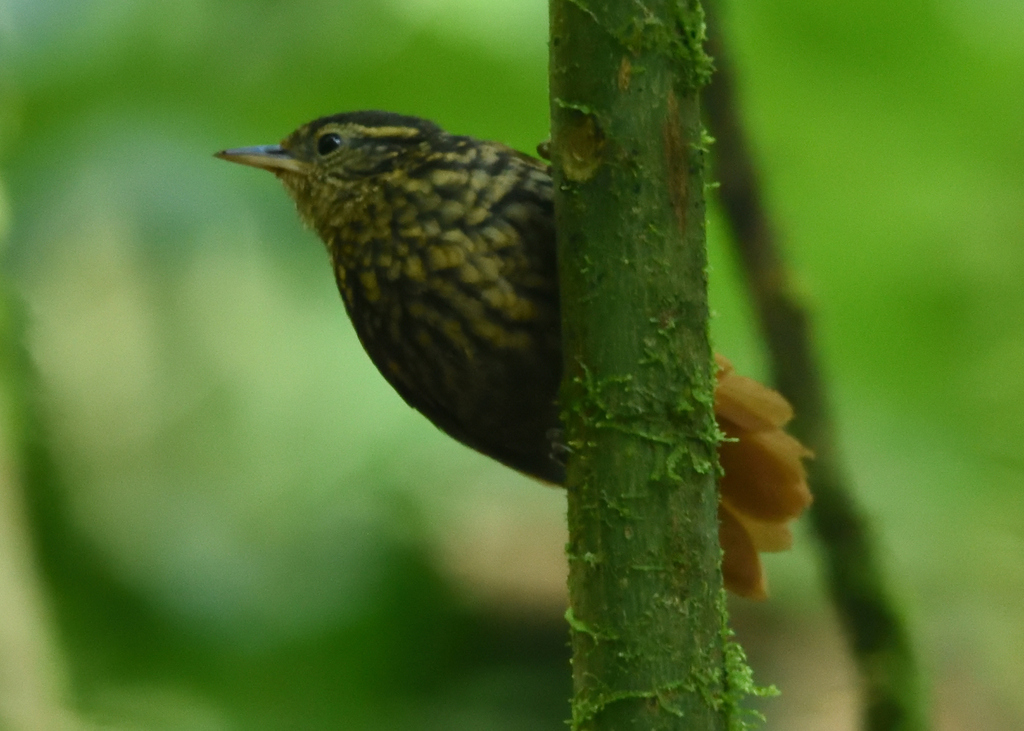

Conservation status
- Least Concern (IUCN 3.1)]

Scientific classification
- Kingdom: Animalia
- Phylum: Chordata
- Class: Aves
- Order: Passeriformes
- Family: Furnariidae
- Genus: Premnornis; Ridgway, 1909
- Species: P. guttuliger

Binomial name
- Premnornis guttuliger (Sclater, PL, 1864)

Synonyms
- Premnornis guttuligera

= Rusty-winged barbtail =

Species of bird

The rusty-winged barbtail (Premnornis guttuliger) is a species of bird in the Furnariinae subfamily of the ovenbird family Furnariidae. It is found in Colombia, Ecuador, Peru, and Venezuela.

== Taxonomy and systematics ==
The rusty-winged barbtail is the only member of its genus. It has two subspecies, the nominate P. g. guttuliger (Sclater, PL, 1864) and P. g. venezuelanus (Phelps, WH & Phelps, WH Jr, 1956).

The rusty-winged barbtail is a sister species of the two species in genus Tarphonomus and the two of them are sister to the tuftedcheeks of genus Pseudocolaptes. The rusty-winged barbtail is not closely related to the two barbtails of genus Premnoplex nor to the Roraiman barbtail (Roraimia adjusta).

== Description ==
The rusty-winged barbtail is 13 to 14.5 cm (5.1 to 5.7 in) long and weighs 13 to 17 g (0.46 to 0.60 oz). The sexes' plumages are alike. Adults of the nominate subspecies have a pale buffish or brownish buff supercilium and a dark brown stripe behind the eye; the rest of their face is streaked brown and buff. Their crown is dark olive-brown with a faint scallop pattern. The sides of their neck and upper back are brownish with pale buff spots, their lower back is browner and unspotted, their rump is brown with a faint rufescent tinge, and their uppertail coverts are chestnut. Their tail is chestnut; its feathers are wide and terminate in the short bare namesake barbs or "spines". (Confusingly, these "barbs" are formed by the absence of the feather barbs that line the feather's shaft.) Their wing coverts are dark brownish with wide rufescent brown edges that form indistinct wing bars. Their flight feathers are dark fuscous with rufescent edges. Their throat is golden-buff with faint dark speckles, their breast dark brownish with golden-buff "teardrops", their belly dark brownish with golden-buff streaks on its upper half, and their flanks and undertail coverts rufescent brown. Their iris is brown to dark brown, their maxilla black to dark brownish, their mandible pinkish, pinkish gray, or dull ivory, and their legs and feet gray to blue-gray to pinkish gray. Juveniles have buff streaks on their back and rump and heavier spots on rufous-washed underparts than adults. Subspecies P. g. venezuelanus has a darker, less rufous and more olivaceous crown and back than the nominate.

== Distribution and habitat ==
The nominate subspecies of the rusty-winged barbtail is found in all three Andean ranges of Colombia and south through the Andes of Ecuador into those of Peru as far as the Department of Puno. Though the IUCN lists its range as extending into Bolivia, the South American Classification Committee of the American Ornithological Society has no records from that country. Subspecies P. g. venezuelanus is found in the Serranía del Perijá that straddles the Colombia/Venezuela border and in the Andes of Venezuela's Táchira state. It inhabits subtropical montane evergreen forest. In elevation it ranges between 1,400 and 2,700 m (4,600 and 8,900 ft) in Colombia and mostly between 1,600 and 2,300 m (5,200 and 7,500 ft) in Ecuador. It occurs locally as low as 1,300 m (4,300 ft) in Peru.

== Behavior ==
=== Movement ===
The rusty-winged barbtail is a year-round resident throughout its range.

=== Feeding ===
The rusty-winged barbtail feeds almost exclusively on arthropods. Single birds and occasionally pairs usually join mixed-species foraging flocks to feed from the forest's understory to its mid level; they will also feed in the subcanopy. It gleans prey from moss, dead leaves, and live foliage as it hops and clambers along limbs and will "burrow" into clumps of moss.

=== Breeding ===
The rusty-winged barbtail's breeding season has not been fully defined but appears to span at least August to December. It is thought to be monogamous. Its nest has not been described but one was found with two eggs. Nothing else is known about the species' breeding biology.

=== Vocalization ===
The rusty-winged barbtail is seldom vocal. What is thought to be its song is a fast, accelerating, "'tsi-tsi-tsi-si-si-sisisisisisi". Its call is described as a sharp "tseep" or "tsip" that sometimes runs into a series.

== Status ==
The IUCN has assessed the rusty-winged barbtail as being of Least Concern. It has a large range and its population size is not known, but the latter is believed to be stable. No immediate threats have been identified. It is considered uncommon to locally common and occurs in some protected areas.
