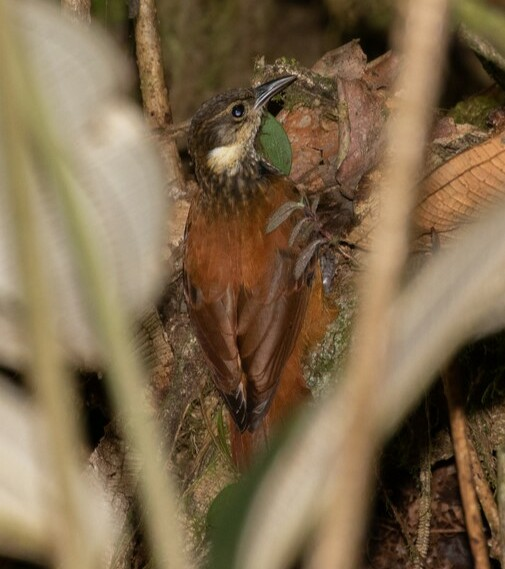

Conservation status
- Least Concern (IUCN 3.1)

Scientific classification
- Kingdom: Animalia
- Phylum: Chordata
- Class: Aves
- Order: Passeriformes
- Family: Furnariidae
- Genus: Pseudocolaptes
- Species: P. johnsoni

Binomial name
- Pseudocolaptes johnsoni Lönnberg & Rendahl, 1922

= Pacific tuftedcheek =

Species of bird

The Pacific tuftedcheek (Pseudocolaptes johnsoni) is a passerine bird in the Furnariinae subfamily of the ovenbird family Furnariidae. It is found in Colombia and Ecuador.

== Taxonomy and systematics ==
The Pacific tuftedcheek and the buffy tuftedcheek (Pseudocolaptes lawrencii) were previously considered subspecies of the streaked tuftedcheek (P. boissonneautii). The buffy tuftedcheek was then separated with the Pacific as a subspecies of it. Though some authors in the early twentieth century treated the Pacific as a species, major taxonomic systems did not begin treating the buffy and Pacific tuftedcheeks as separate species until the mid-2010s. The American Ornithological Society and the Clements taxonomy were the last; they implemented the split in 2022.

The Pacific tuftedcheek is monotypic.

== Description ==
The Pacific tuftedcheek is 20 to 21 cm (7.9 to 8.3 in) long and weighs about 58 g (2.0 oz). It is a rather large and strongly patterned ovenbird. The sexes' plumages are alike but the female has a significantly longer bill than the male. The species' most distinctive feature is its namesake pale tawny tuft of feathers that flare on the side of the neck. Adults have a buff-whitish supercilium and blackish brown lores and ear coverts. Their crown is blackish brown with many thin buff streaks, their hindcrown similar with wider streaks, and the rest of their back rufous and unstreaked. Their rump, uppertail coverts, and tail are bright chestnut rufous. Their wing coverts are gray-brown with inconspicuous rufous edges and their wings are blackish brown with rufous-tan outer vanes on the primaries. Their throat has a buff marbled appearance, their breast is a blurry pattern of white chevrons on a rufous brown base, and their belly, flanks, and undertail coverts are rich rufous. Their iris is dark brown, their maxilla black to dark brown, their mandible usually paler than the maxilla with a darker center, and their legs and feet olive green to yellowish olive.

== Distribution and habitat ==
The Pacific tuftedcheek has several disjunct populations between Antioquia and Chocó departments in Colombia and El Oro Province in southern Ecuador. It inhabits humid montane evergreen forest, where it favors somewhat open tracts, the edges of denser tracts, and clearings with scattered trees. In elevation it mostly ranges from 900 to 1,500 m (3,000 to 4,900 ft) but is also found as low as 700 m (2,300 ft) and as high as 2,200 m (7,200 ft).

== Behavior ==
=== Movement ===
The Pacific tuftedcheek is a year-round resident throughout its range.

=== Feeding ===
The Pacific tuftedcheek's diet has not been studied but is assumed to be similar to that of the buffy tuftedcheek, which is mostly a wide variety of arthropods but also includes small amphibians. It forages singly or in pairs and frequently joins mixed species feeding flocks. It forages by clambering along branches from the forest's mid level to the canopy, and does most of its foraging in epiphytes. It also seeks prey in mosses and among clumps of dead leaves.

=== Breeding ===
The Pacific tuftedcheek's breeding season has not been defined but includes at least April to June. It is believed to be monogamous. One nest was in an old woodpecker hole in a rotten trunk. The clutch is one egg. Both parents provisioned the nestling. The incubation period and time to fledging are not known.

=== Vocalization ===
The Pacific tuftedcheek sings mainly in the breeding season, a "high-pitched trilled series of notes slowing into stuttering and ending with a characteristic high-pitched downslurred sibilant note...chi'ch't't't't'e'e'bzzzuuu". It usually sings the phrase one time but occasionally repeats it several times. It calls throughout the year, usually in the morning while foraging, a "loud, metallic, staccato peek! or spik!". Another call is a "long nasal rattle of identical notes". The song is assumed to have a territorial function while the "peek" call is thought to be for keeping contact with a mate.

== Status ==
The IUCN has assessed the Pacific tuftedcheek as being of Least Concern. Though it has a very limited and fragmented range and its population size is not known, the latter is believed to be stable. No immediate threats have been identified. It is considered local in Colombia and uncommon to rare in Ecuador. It occurs in several protected areas.
