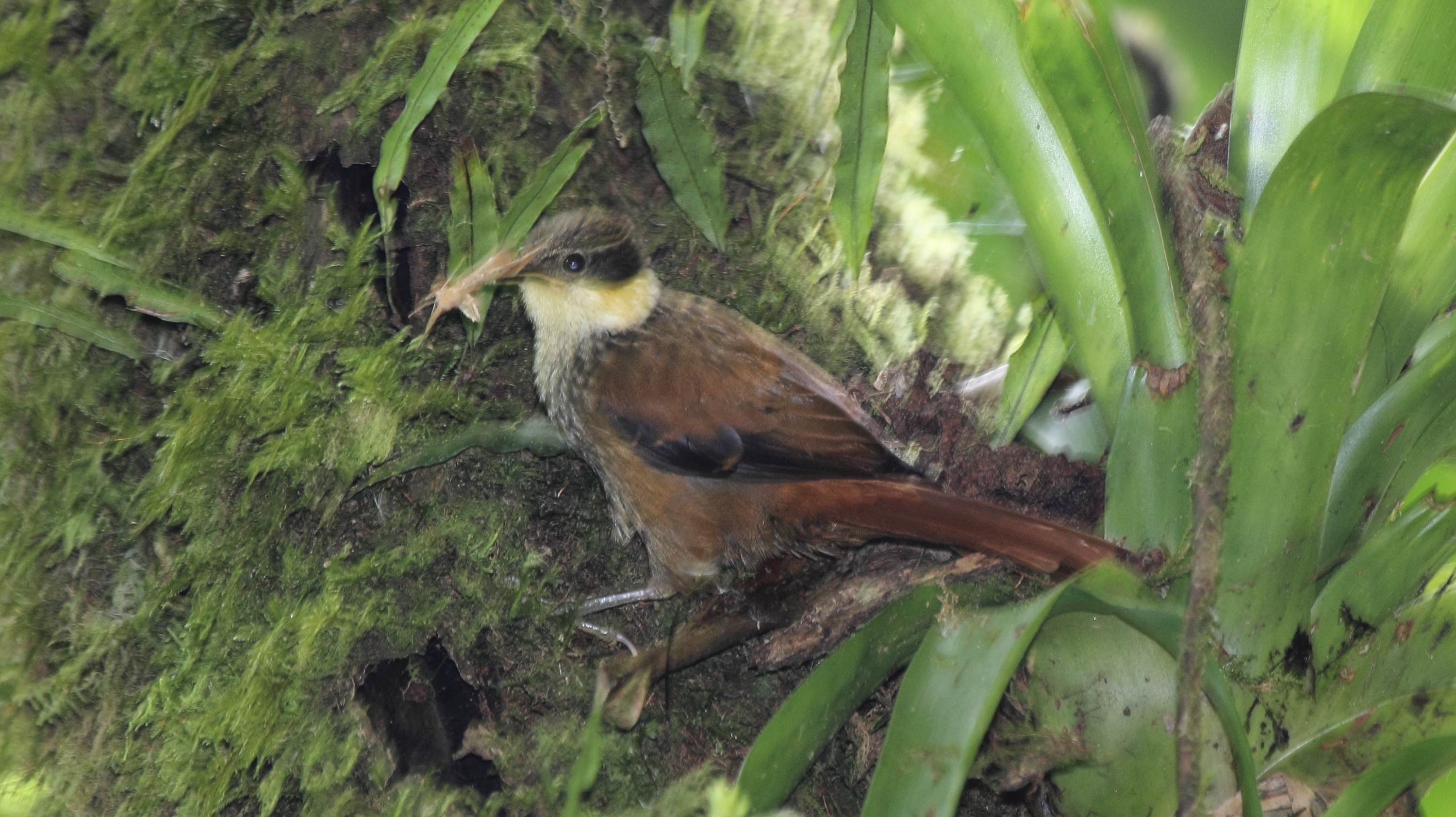

Conservation status
- Least Concern (IUCN 3.1)

Scientific classification
- Kingdom: Animalia
- Phylum: Chordata
- Class: Aves
- Order: Passeriformes
- Family: Furnariidae
- Genus: Pseudocolaptes
- Species: P. lawrencii

Binomial name
- Pseudocolaptes lawrencii Ridgway, 1878

= Buffy tuftedcheek =

Species of bird

The buffy tuftedcheek (Pseudocolaptes lawrencii) or Lawrence's tuftedcheek, is a passerine bird in the Furnariinae subfamily of the ovenbird family Furnariidae. It is found in Costa Rica and Panama.

== Taxonomy and systematics ==
The buffy tuftedcheek and the Pacific tuftedcheek (Pseudocolaptes johnsoni) were previously considered subspecies of the streaked tuftedcheek (P. boissonneautii). The buffy tuftedcheek was then separated with the Pacific as a subspecies of it. Though some authors in the early twentieth century treated the Pacific as a species, major taxonomic systems did not begin treating the buffy and Pacific tuftedcheeks as separate species until the mid-2010s. The American Ornithological Society and the Clements taxonomy were the last; they implemented the split in 2022.

The buffy tuftedcheek's alternative English name and it specific epithet commemorate the American amateur ornithologist George Newbold Lawrence.

The buffy tuftedcheek is monotypic.

== Description ==
The buffy tuftedcheek is 20 to 21 cm (7.9 to 8.3 in) long and weighs about 35 to 50 g (1.2 to 1.8 oz). The sexes' plumages are alike but the female has a significantly longer bill than the male. The species' most distinctive feature is its namesake pale golden tawny tuft of feathers that flare on the side of the neck. Adults have a buff-whitish supercilium and blackish brown lores and ear coverts. Their crown is blackish brown with many thin buff streaks, their hindcrown similar with wider streaks, and the rest of their back rufescent-brown with a faint blackish scallop pattern. Their rump, uppertail coverts, and tail are bright chestnut rufous. Their wings are blackish brown with pale rufous and ochraceous buff tips on the coverts that form bars when the wing is closed. Their throat is whitish with a golden-tawny tinge, their breast a blurry pattern of wide dull brown and pale buff streaks, their belly dull tawny-buff with faint darker mottling, their flanks rufescent brown, and their undertail coverts ochraceous to cinnamon. Their iris is dark brown, their maxilla black to dark brown, their mandible usually paler than the maxilla with a darker center, and their legs and feet olive green to yellowish olive. Juveniles have a much shorter bill than adults and lack the streaks on the crown; they have a blackish brown scallop pattern on the throat and breast and more rufescent flanks and belly.

== Distribution and habitat ==
The buffy tuftedcheek is found from the central part of Costa Rica's Central Highlands south into western Panama as far as Veraguas Province. It inhabits humid montane evergreen forest, where it favors somewhat open tracts, the edges of denser tracts, and clearings with scattered trees. In elevation it ranges from 1,550 m (5,100 ft) to timberline at about 3,000 m (9,800 ft).

== Behavior ==
=== Movement ===
The buffy tuftedcheek is a year-round resident throughout its range.

=== Feeding ===
The buffy tuftedcheek's diet is mostly a wide variety of arthropods but also includes small amphibians. It forages singly or in pairs and frequently joins mixed species feeding flocks. It forages by clambering along branches from the forest's mid level to the canopy. It does most of its foraging in epiphytes, among which it favors bromeliads. It also seeks prey in mosses and among clumps of dead leaves.

=== Breeding ===
The buffy tuftedcheek is believed to be monogamous. It nests between January and May in Costa Rica. It nests in a cavity in a tree, either natural or one made by a small woodpecker, which it lines with plant matter like brown tree fern scales. Only one nest has been extensively studied. At it the single egg and nestling were tended by one adult. The nestling period was at least 29 days.

=== Vocalization ===
The buffy tuftedcheek sings mainly in the breeding season, a "few well-spaced staccato notes followed by a liquid gurgling trill...peek...peek...prrreeee-e-e-e". It usually sings the phrase one time but occasionally repeats it several times. It calls throughout the year, usually in the morning while foraging, a "loud, metallic, staccato peek! or spik!". The song is assumed to have a territorial function while the call is thought to be for keeping contact with a mate.

== Status ==
The IUCN has assessed the buffy tuftedcheek as being of Least Concern. Though it has a limited range and its population size is not known, the latter is believed to be stable. No immediate threats have been identified. It is considered uncommon to fairly common in Costa Rica and rare in Panama. It occurs in several protected areas.
