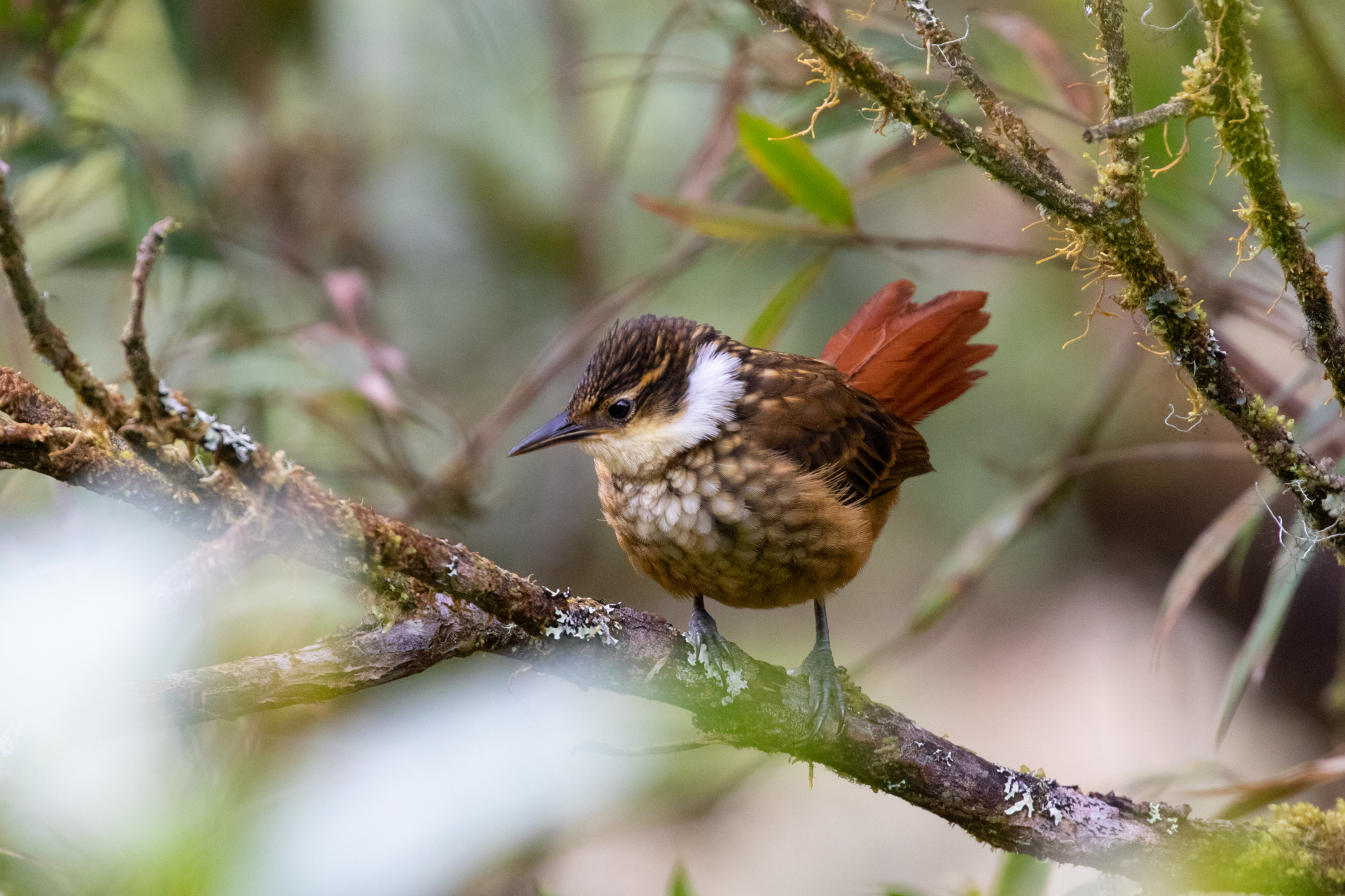

Conservation status
- Least Concern (IUCN 3.1)

Scientific classification
- Kingdom: Animalia
- Phylum: Chordata
- Class: Aves
- Order: Passeriformes
- Family: Furnariidae
- Genus: Pseudocolaptes
- Species: P. boissonneautii

Binomial name
- Pseudocolaptes boissonneautii (Lafresnaye, 1840)

Synonyms
- Pseudocolaptes boissonneauii

= Streaked tuftedcheek =

Species of bird

The streaked tuftedcheek (Pseudocolaptes boissonneautii) is a passerine bird in the Furnariinae subfamily of the ovenbird family Furnariidae. It is found in Bolivia, Colombia, Ecuador, Peru, and Venezuela.

== Taxonomy and systematics ==
According to the International Ornithological Committee (IOC) and BirdLife International's Handbook of the Birds of the World, the streaked tuftedcheek has these eight subspecies:

- P. b. striaticeps Hellmayr & Seilern, 1912
- P. b. meridae Hartert, EJO & Goodson, 1917
- P. b. boissonneautii (Lafresnaye, 1840)
- P. b. oberholseri Cory, 1919
- P. b. intermedianus Chapman, 1923
- P. b. medianus Hellmayr, 1919
- P. b. auritus (Tschudi, 1844)
- P. b. carabayae Zimmer, JT, 1936

HBW spells the species' specific epithet boissonneauii (without a "t"), as that is how its namesake Auguste Boissonneau spelled his name. Other taxonomic systems retain the "t", though the South American Classification Committee of the American Ornithological Society (AOS) is seeking a proposal to correct the spelling.

The Clements taxonomy adds two more subspecies, P. b. orientalis (Zimmer, JT, 1935) and P. b. pallidus (Zimmer, JT, 1935). The IOC and HBW include orientalis in oberholseri and pallidus in medianus.

What are now the buffy tuftedcheek (P. lawrencii) and the Pacific tuftedcheek (P. johnsoni) were previously considered subspecies of the streaked tuftedcheek. Though some authors had treated the three of them as separate species in the early twentieth century, major taxonomic systems did not begin doing so until the mid-2010s. The AOS and the Clements taxonomy were the last; they implemented the split in 2022.

This article follows the IOC/HBW eight-subspecies model.

== Description ==
The streaked tuftedcheek is 20 to 22 cm (7.9 to 8.7 in) long and weighs 37 to 62 g (1.3 to 2.2 oz). It is a rather large and strongly patterned ovenbird. The sexes' plumages are alike but the female of most subspecies has a significantly longer bill than the male. The species' most distinctive feature is its namesake tuft of almost pure white feathers that flare on the side of the neck. Adults of the nominate subspecies P. b. boissonneautii have a buff-whitish supercilium, blackish brown lores and ear coverts, and white cheeks. Their crown is blackish brown with many thin buff streaks, their hindneck and upper back similar with wider pale buff streaks, and the rest of their back rufescent brown. Their rump and uppertail coverts are bright chestnut rufous and their tail bright rufous. Their wings are blackish brown with pale rufous edges and tips on the coverts. Their secondaries have rufous edges at their base and their tertials are mostly rufous. Their throat is white, their breast a pale golden buff with dark brown feather edges that give a scaly look, and the rest of their underparts unmarked rufous that darkens to the undertail coverts. Their iris is brown to dark brown, their maxilla black, their mandible grayish white to silvery with a blackish upper third, and their legs and feet gray to slate. Juveniles have a much shorter bill than adults, an unmarked black crown, dense black scallop markings on the breast, and rich rufous belly and flanks.

The other subspecies of the streaked tuftedcheek differ from the nominate and each other thus:

- P. b. striaticeps, less scaling on the breast and duller underparts than the nominate
- P. b. meridae, little or no black edges on neck and breast feathers
- P. b. oberholseri, darker crown and heavier black edges on neck and breast feathers than nominate
- P. b. intermedianus, like oberholseri with heavier markings on its back
- P. b. medianus, yellowish tinge on throat
- P. b. auritus, like medianus but little difference in bill length between the sexes
- P. b. carabayae, like auritus but smaller, with blacker back and darker more chestnut rump

== Distribution and habitat ==
The subspecies of the streaked tuftedcheek are found thus:

- P. b. striaticeps: the Venezuelan Coastal Range
- P. b. meridae: the Serranía del Perijá and Andes that straddle the Colombia/Venezuela border
- P. b. boissonneautii: Colombia's Western and Southern Andes and the southern part of the Eastern Andes
- P. b. oberholseri: southern Colombia to southern Ecuador
- P. b. intermedianus: western slope of the Andes in northwestern Peru
- P. b. medianus: Andes of northern Peru
- P. b. auritus: eastern slope of the Andes of central Peru
- P. b. carabayae: eastern slope of the Andes from southern Peru south into central Bolivia

The streaked tuftedcheek inhabits the interior and edges of humid montane evergreen forest and elfin forest. In elevation it mostly ranges from 1,700 to 3,200 m (5,600 to 10,500 ft) but is also found as low as 1,450 m (4,800 ft) and as high as 3,500 m (11,500 ft).

== Behavior ==
=== Movement ===
The streaked tuftedcheek is a year-round resident throughout its range.

=== Feeding ===
The streaked tuftedcheek's diet has not been studied in detail but is known to include arthropods and small amphibians. It forages singly or in pairs and frequently joins mixed species feeding flocks. It forages by clambering along branches from the forest's mid level to the canopy, and does most of its foraging in epiphytes. It also seeks prey in mosses and among clumps of dead leaves.

=== Breeding ===
The streaked tuftedcheek's breeding season is not known but in Colombia appears to end in September. It is believed to be monogamous. It nests in an old woodpecker hole in a dead tree trunk. Nothing else is known about its breeding biology.

=== Vocalization ===
The streaked tuftedcheek is not highly vocal. Its song a complex: "sharp 'spik' notes followed by series of whistled tinkling 'tsee' or 'che' notes on same pitch, slightly accelerating, followed by dry, quavering trill, sometimes ending abruptly with distinct notes, 'spik, spik, chechehchehchechechechchchch… dzdzdzdzdzdzdzdzdzdz' ". Its contact call has been described as "a loud, dry 'chut' or 'chink' " and "a loud 'chink!' or 'cheeyk!' ".

== Status ==
The IUCN has assessed the streaked tuftedcheek as being of Least Concern. It has a large range and its population size is not known, but the latter is believed to be stable. No immediate threats have been identified. It is considered uncommon to common throughout its range and occurs in many protected areas.
