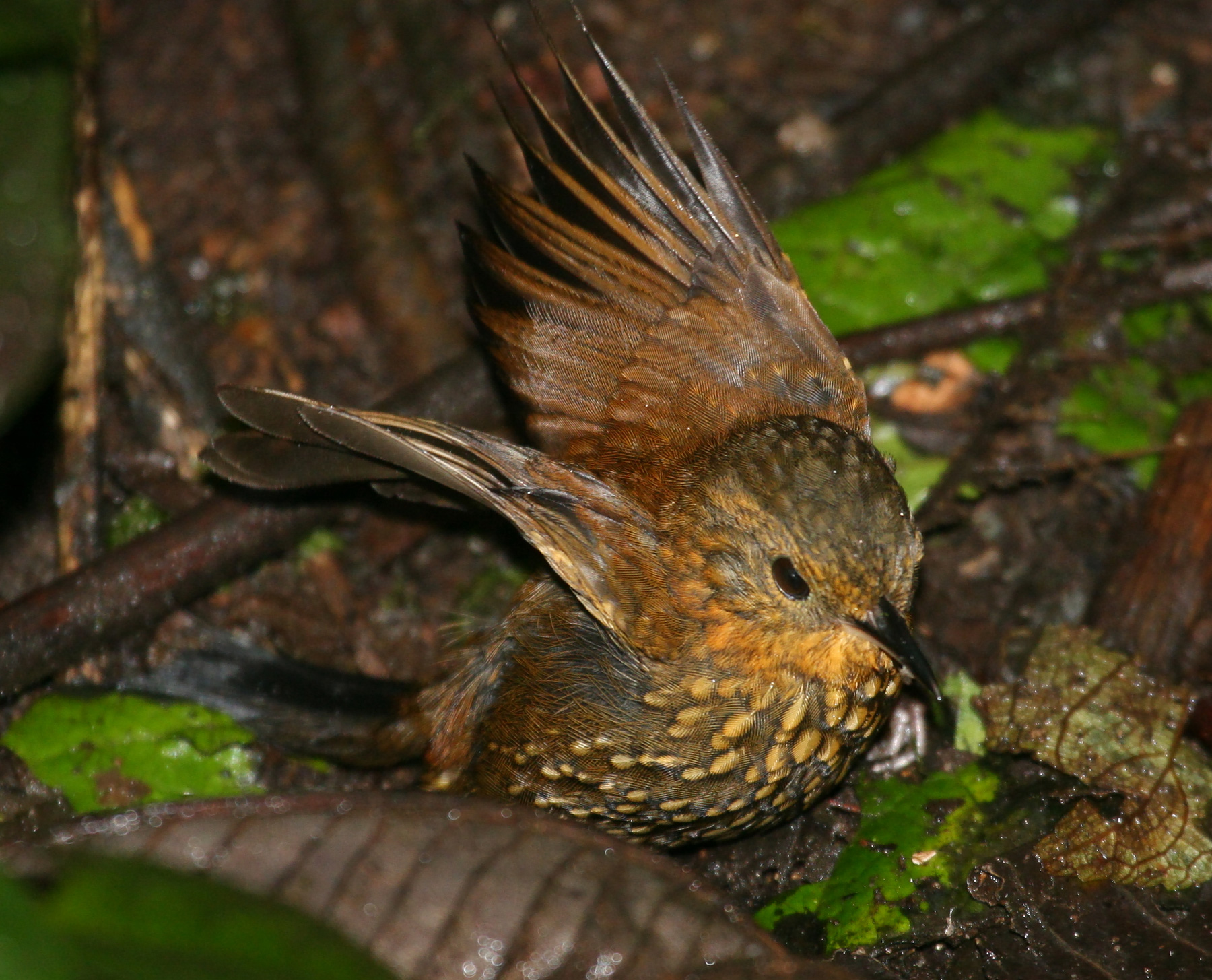

Conservation status
- Least Concern (IUCN 3.1)

Scientific classification
- Kingdom: Animalia
- Phylum: Chordata
- Class: Aves
- Order: Passeriformes
- Family: Furnariidae
- Genus: Premnoplex
- Species: P. brunnescens

Binomial name
- Premnoplex brunnescens (Sclater, PL, 1856)

= Spotted barbtail =

Species of bird

The spotted barbtail (Premnoplex brunnescens) is a species of bird in the family Furnariidae. Its natural habitat is subtropical or tropical moist montane forest.

== Taxonomy ==
The spotted barbtail was described in 1856 from a type specimen collected in Bogotá, Colombia. It was previously considered to be the same species as the white-throated barbtail (Premnoplex tatei) of Venezuela, and is now classified as a sister species to that bird. Five subspecies are recognized within P. brunnescens, although they are considerably differentiated genetically, and may constitute separate species. The five subspecies are P. b. brunneicauda, found in Costa Rica and Western Panama; P. b. brunnescens, found in Eastern Panama, the neighboring regions of Western Colombia, and the mountains of Western Venezuela south to Ecuador and Peru; P. b. coloratus, restricted to the Santa Marta Mountains in Northern Colombia; P. b. rostratus, restricted to the coastal mountains of Northern Venezuela; and P. b. stictonotus, found in the Andes from Southern Peru to Western and central Bolivia.

== Description ==
The spotted barbtail ranges from 13 to 15 centimetres (5.1 to 5.9 in) in length, and from 14 to 19 grams in weight. The species does not exhibit sexual dimorphism; males and females are alike. Within its family the spotted barbtail is small and dark, with rich patterning on its underside. The forehead is dark greyish-brown, with spots that are tawny or ochraceous in color. The bird has a narrow supercilium, formed by a series of closely spaced spots above and behind the eye. Similar lines of spots extend down the neck from the supercilium. The crown of the head is also grey brown, with dark-edged feathers, giving the bird a scalloped appearance. The spots on the forehead fade into the crown. The back is dark brown, blackish-edged feathers, similar to but less conspicuous than on the crown. The rump has the same scalloped appearance, and has a slight chestnut hue.

The uppertail coverts are chestnut-brown in color, while the wings are largely dark brown. The primary coverts are darker than the rest of the wing, while the other coverts have darker centers. The central feathers of the tail are somewhat stiffened. The tips of all the tail feathers lack barbs, giving the tail a "spiny" appearance. The bird's throat is also tawny in color, with brownish edging to the feathers. Birds within the subspecies albescens have a paler whitish throat. The belly and breast of the bird are dull brown with elongated spots that are tawny in color and outlined in dark brown. The spots are largest on the breast, becoming smaller and less visible approaching the vent, while they fade into streaking on the flanks. The undertail coverts are also dull brown with a faint spots. The upper mandible of the bird's beak is black or dark brown, while the lower mandible varies between greyish-pink to horn-colored, and occasionally has a darker tip. The iris is black. The spotted barbtail is similar in appearance to the white-throated barbtail, but is distinguished by having spots that are tawny rather than white, smaller and less dense spots on its breast, and a shallower beak.

== Feeding ==
The spotted barbtail has been reported to feed on beetles, various hymenopteran insects, cockroach eggs, and spiders. The foraging behavior of the species seems to vary regionally; it has been reported as feeding alone, as feeding in pairs or family groups, and in mixed-species flocks. The spotted barbtail feeds in the forest understorey, though it may infrequently venture higher up some trees. It may be seen climbing along branches, including very thin ones. It often uses its tail for support, and sometimes may be seen hanging upside-down, or hanging on the underside of a branch. It is a gleaner, searching for food on mossy sections of trees, crevices in tree bark, and among epiphytes.

== Reproduction ==
The spotted barbtail is thought to be a monogamous species. It has been observed to breed largely from March to June in the Central American parts of its range, while in the Andes, eggs have been observed in March and June, and nestlings in April. Two eggs are laid at a time; the eggs are completely white, and are approximately 22 mm (0.9 in) long by 17 mm (0.7 in) wide, making them disproportionately large relative to the bird itself. They are usually incubated for 27 days. Nestlings are looked after for approximately three weeks. Both sexes participate in parental care. The nest of the species is described as a "massive ball" made of lichen, liverworts, and moss, along with tiny roots, that is approximately 30 cm (12 in) in diameter. The ball has a tube-like entrance at its base, with a short tunnel leading to a central space 6 to 8 cm (2.4 to 3.1 in) across that is lined with fibres and moss. The nest is usually placed in a shaded area close to a stream, and is built in a crevice in a tree or rock, or hanging under a branch or fallen log. It is usually within a couple of meters of the ground.

== Habitat and distribution ==
The spotted barbtail is found in evergreen montane forest : in the Talamancan montane forests and throughout the northern Andes. It exhibits a preference for areas with moss and epiphytes. In Central America it occurs between 1,200 to 2,300 metres (3,900 to 7,500 ft) above sea level, whereas in the Andes it is found from 900 to 2,600 m (3,000 to 8,500 ft), extending occasionally up to 3,000 m (9,800 ft), and down to 650 m (2,130 ft) in the Western Andes. It is common across its distribution, and has been found in fragmented as well as intact habitat. It is not considered threatened globally. It is a sedentary species.
