= White-throated barbtail =

Conservation status
- Endangered (IUCN 3.1)(For Premnoplex tatei)

- Endangered (IUCN 3.1)(For Premnoplex pariae (See Taxonomy and Status sections))

Scientific classification
- Kingdom: Animalia
- Phylum: Chordata
- Class: Aves
- Order: Passeriformes
- Family: Furnariidae
- Genus: Premnoplex
- Species: P. tatei

Binomial name
- Premnoplex tatei Chapman, 1925
- Range of P. t. tatei

Species of bird

The white-throated barbtail (Premnoplex tatei) is an Endangered species of bird in the Furnariinae subfamily of the ovenbird family Furnariidae. It is endemic to Venezuela.

== Taxonomy and systematics ==
The white-throated barbtail was originally described as a full species and later treated as a subspecies of the spotted barbtail (P. brunnescens) by many authors. Based on voice, habitat, behavioral, and genetic differences described in 2007 and 2010 publications it was elevated back to species rank. The white-throated and spotted barbtails form a superspecies.

As of late 2023 its further taxonomy is unsettled. The South American Classification Committee of the American Ornithological Society, the International Ornithological Committee, and the Clements taxonomy assign it two subspecies, the nominate P. t. tatei (Chapman, 1925) and P. t. pariae (Phelps, WH & Phelps, WH Jr, 1949). BirdLife International's Handbook of the Birds of the World (HBW) treats the two taxa as separate species. It retains the English name white-throated barbtail for P. tatei sensu stricto and calls P. pariae the Paria barbtail. Some data generated since the 2010 publication support the two-species model.

This article follows the one-species, two-subspecies model.

== Description ==
The white-throated barbtail is 14 to 15 cm (5.5 to 5.9 in) long. The sexes have the same plumage. Adults of the nominate subspecies have a whitish supercilium, brownish ear coverts, and whitish streaks on the side of the neck. Their crown is dark gray-brown with a blackish scalloped appearance. Their back, rump, and uppertail coverts are dark gray-brown with a rufous tinge. Their wings and tail are dark fuscous; the ends of the tail feathers lack barbs, giving a spiny appearance. Their throat and upper breast are whitish and the rest of their underparts dark brownish with whitish streaks. Their iris is dark brown, their maxilla black, their mandible pale grayish pink (often with a black tip), and their legs and feet dark gray-brown to black. Juveniles are similar to adults. Subspecies P. t. pariae has a darker, duskier crown than the nominate, an unmarked buff throat, and darker brown underparts. Its breast has less distinct markings and its belly has wider streaks.

== Distribution and habitat ==
The white-throated barbtail has a disjunct distribution. The nominate subspecies is found along several mountain ranges in the northeastern Venezuelan states of Anzoátegui, Sucre and Monagas. It is found at elevations between 1,100 and 2,400 m (3,610 and 7,870 ft). Subspecies P. t. pariae is found along the eastern mountains of Venezuela's Paria Peninsula, where it occurs at elevations between 800 and 1,200 m (2,620 and 3,940 ft). The species inhabits wet, mossy, montane evergreen forest, where it favors an understory dominated by small palms and plants of the Arum family (Araceae).

== Behavior ==
=== Feeding ===
The white-throated barbtail's diet has not been studied but it is believed to be mostly arthropods. It typically forages singly or in pairs, and sometimes to regularly joins mixed-species feeding flocks. It tends to feed low in the undergrowth, sometimes on the ground but more commonly up to about 3 m (10 ft) above it. It is doesn't hitch along trunks and branches but gleans prey from logs and rocks, and on the ground tosses aside leaf litter.

=== Breeding ===
The white-throated barbtail's breeding season spans at least May to August. The one known nest was a short tube of moss leading to a moss cup. It was on the floor of a shallow cavity in an earthen bank. It held two nestlings whose estimated time to fledging was 19 to 21 days after hatch. Both parents cared for the nestlings.

=== Vocalization ===
The subspecies of the white-throated barbtail have different songs. That of the nominate is "low-pitched, doubled or tripled, whistled notes or a bubbly series of low, soft, reedy whistles, we-whúr, we-whúr, we-héét". That of P. t. pariae is "a continuously repeated short, rapid, almost rattled but variable series of 2–6 subdued mellow notes, pu-dut...pu-du-du-dut...pu-du-dut....".

== Status ==
The IUCN follows HBW taxonomy and so has separately assessed the "white-throated" and "Paria" barbtails. Both are rated as Endangered. Both have limited ranges. The "white-throated" barbtail has an estimated population of between 1700 and 7000 mature individuals, and it is believed to be decreasing. The "Paria" barbtail has an estimated population of 1000 to 2500 mature individuals, and it too is believed to be decreasing. The principal threats "to both species are habitat loss and fragmentation for agricultural expansion".
