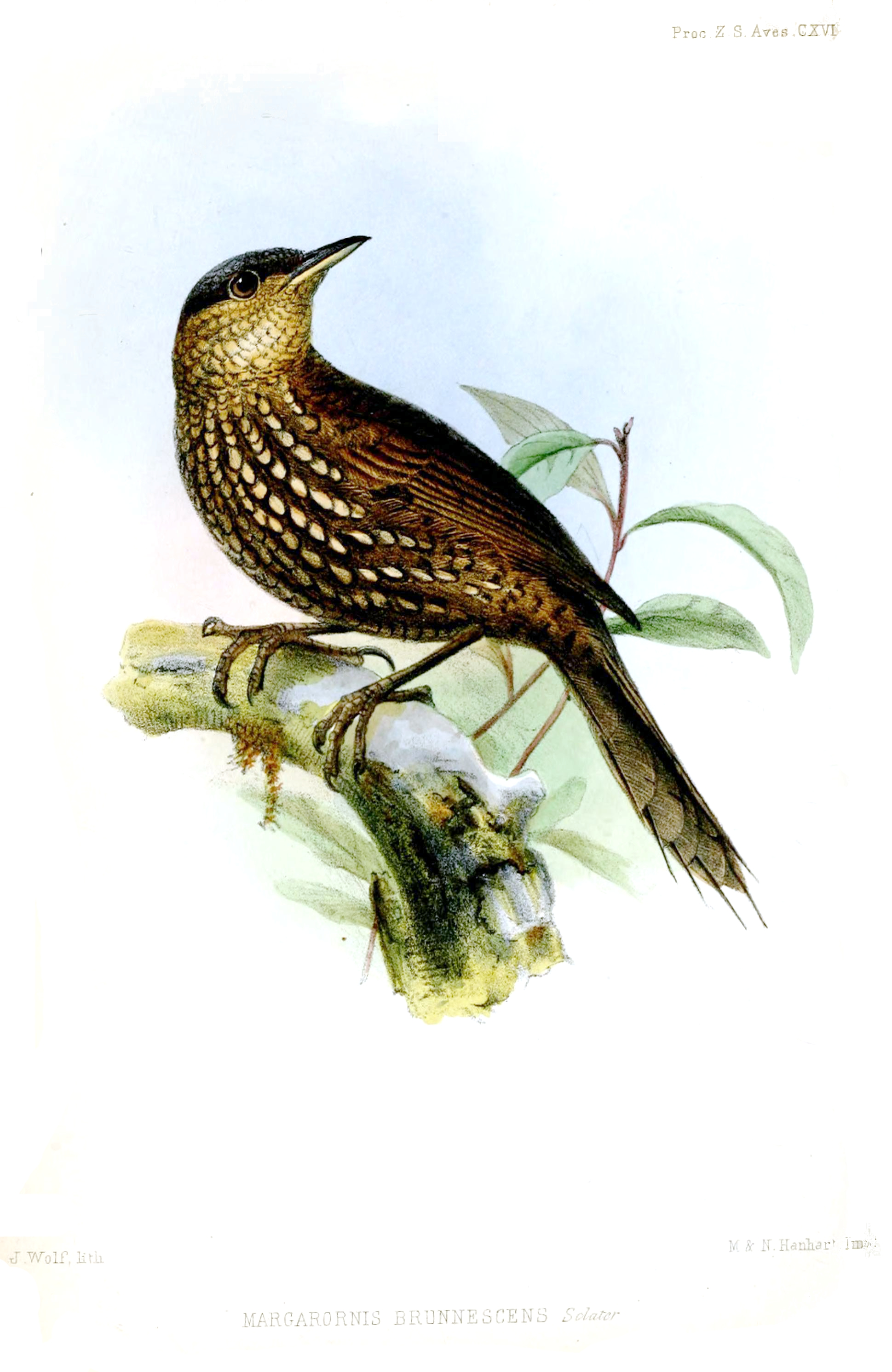
- Spotted barbtail, Premnoplex brunnescens

Scientific classification
- Kingdom: Animalia
- Phylum: Chordata
- Class: Aves
- Order: Passeriformes
- Family: Furnariidae
- Genus: Premnoplex; Cherrie, 1891

Type species
- Margarornis brunnescens Sclater, 1856

Species
- Premnoplex brunnescens Premnoplex tatei

= Premnoplex =

Genus of birds

Premnoplex is the genus of typical barbtails, birds in the family Furnariidae. It contains the following species:

- Spotted barbtail, Premnoplex brunnescens
- White-throated barbtail, Premnoplex tatei

The name Premnoplex comes from the Greek words premnon, meaning "tree trunk" and ples, meaning "to strike".
