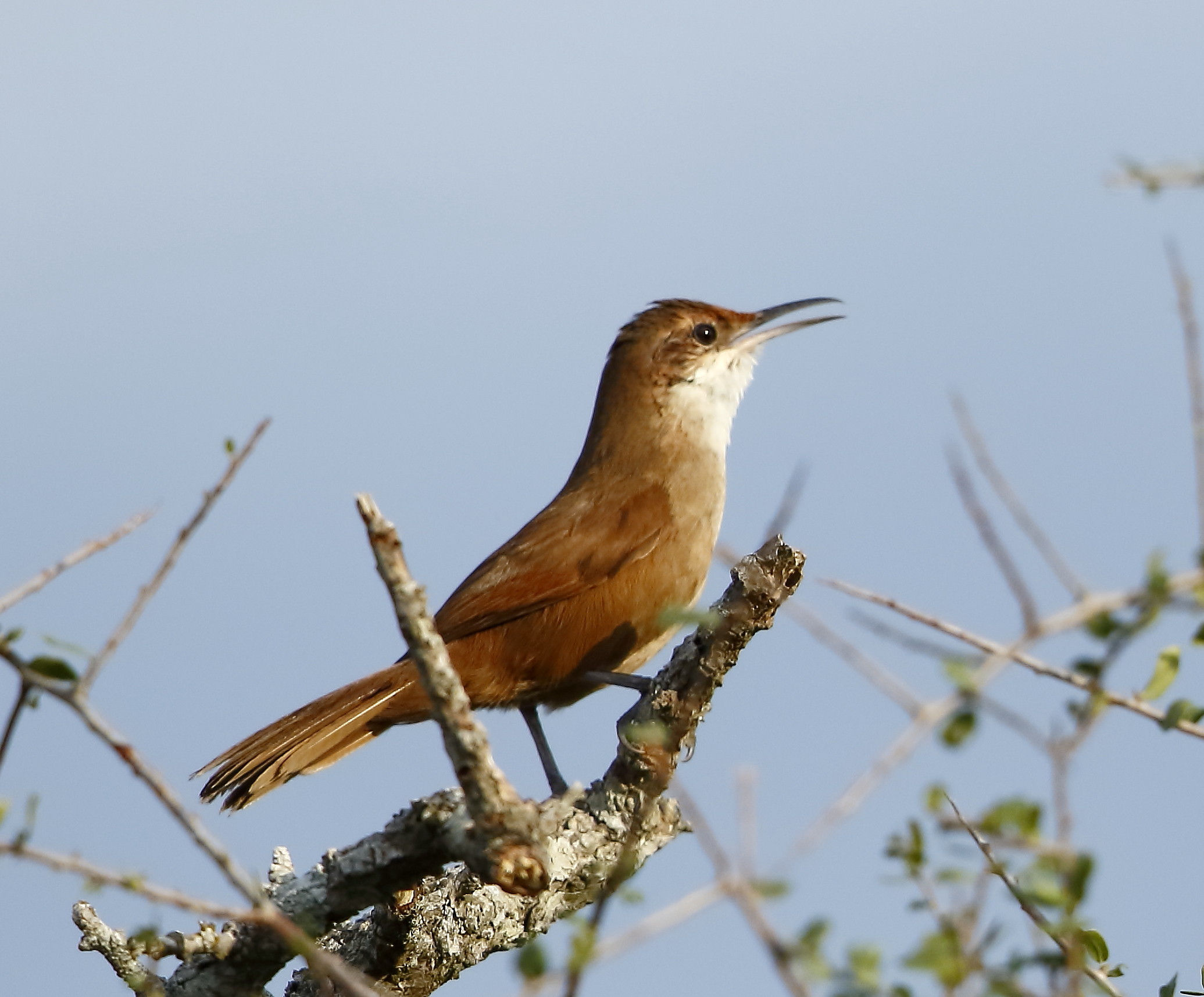
- Chaco earthcreeper (Tarphonomus certhioides)

Scientific classification
- Kingdom: Animalia
- Phylum: Chordata
- Class: Aves
- Order: Passeriformes
- Family: Furnariidae
- Genus: Tarphonomus; Chesser, RT & Brumfield, 2007

Species
- Tarphonomus harterti Tarphonomus certhioides

= Tarphonomus =

Genus of birds

Tarphonomus is a genus of birds in the family Furnariidae. They are found in shrubby habitats in south-central South America. They were formerly included in the genus Upucerthia. It contains the following species:

Image	Scientific name	Common name	Distribution
	Tarphonomus harterti	Bolivian earthcreeper	Bolivia.
	Tarphonomus certhioides	Chaco earthcreeper	Argentina, Bolivia, and Paraguay.
