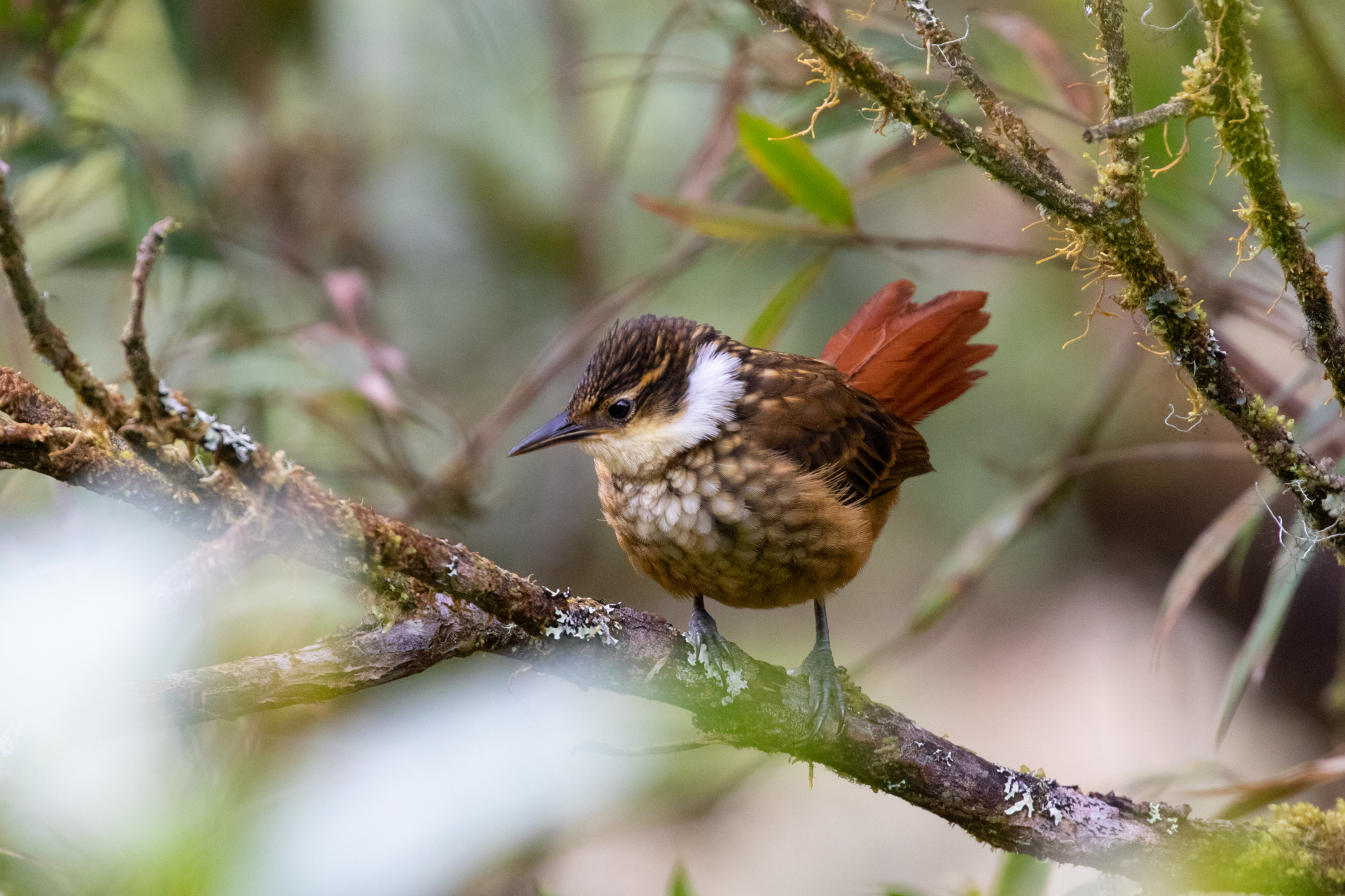
- Streaked tuftedcheek (P. boissonneautii)

Scientific classification
- Kingdom: Animalia
- Phylum: Chordata
- Class: Aves
- Order: Passeriformes
- Family: Furnariidae
- Genus: Pseudocolaptes; Reichenbach, 1853

Type species
- Anabates auritus Streaked tuftedcheek Tschudi, 1844

Species
- P. boissonneautii P. lawrencii P. johnsoni

= Tuftedcheek =

Genus of birds

The tuftedcheeks are a genus, Pseudocolaptes, of passerine birds in the ovenbird family Furnariidae. They are found in the mountains of the tropical New World from Costa Rica to Bolivia.

== Taxonomy ==
The genus Pseudocolaptes was introduced in 1853 by the German naturalist Ludwig Reichenbach. The name combines the Ancient Greek ψεύδος (pseúdos), meaning "false", and κολάπτης (koláptēs), meaning "chiseller, pecker". George Robert Gray designated the type species in 1855 as Anabates auritus Lichtenstein. This taxon is now considered a subspecies of the streaked tuftedcheek (Pseudocolaptes boissonneautii auritus) with Johann Jakob von Tschudi credited as the authority.

=== Species ===
The genus contains three species:

- Buffy tuftedcheek, Pseudocolaptes lawrencii
- Pacific tuftedcheek, Pseudocolaptes johnsoni (formerly a subspecies of Pseudocolaptes lawrencii)
- Streaked tuftedcheek, Pseudocolaptes boissonneautii

These species are resident breeders in wet mountain forests with many epiphytes, normally above 1500 m. The female lays one white egg in a thickly lined old woodpecker nest or other tree cavity. One parent, probably the female, incubates the single white egg for about 29 days to hatching.

The tuftedcheeks are 20–22 cm long weigh 48 g, and have long bright rufous tails, mainly brown upperparts, and a pale-streaked dark brown cap to the head. The feature that gives the group its English name is the tuft of buff or whitish feathers on each cheek. The throat is the same colour as the tufts.

The tuftedcheeks forage actively amongst mosses, vines, bromeliads and other epiphytes for insects, spiders, and even small amphibians. They will join mixed feeding flocks in the middle levels of the mountain forests.
