= Moroni, Comoros =

Capital of Comoros

Moroni موروني Mūrūnī
- Capital city
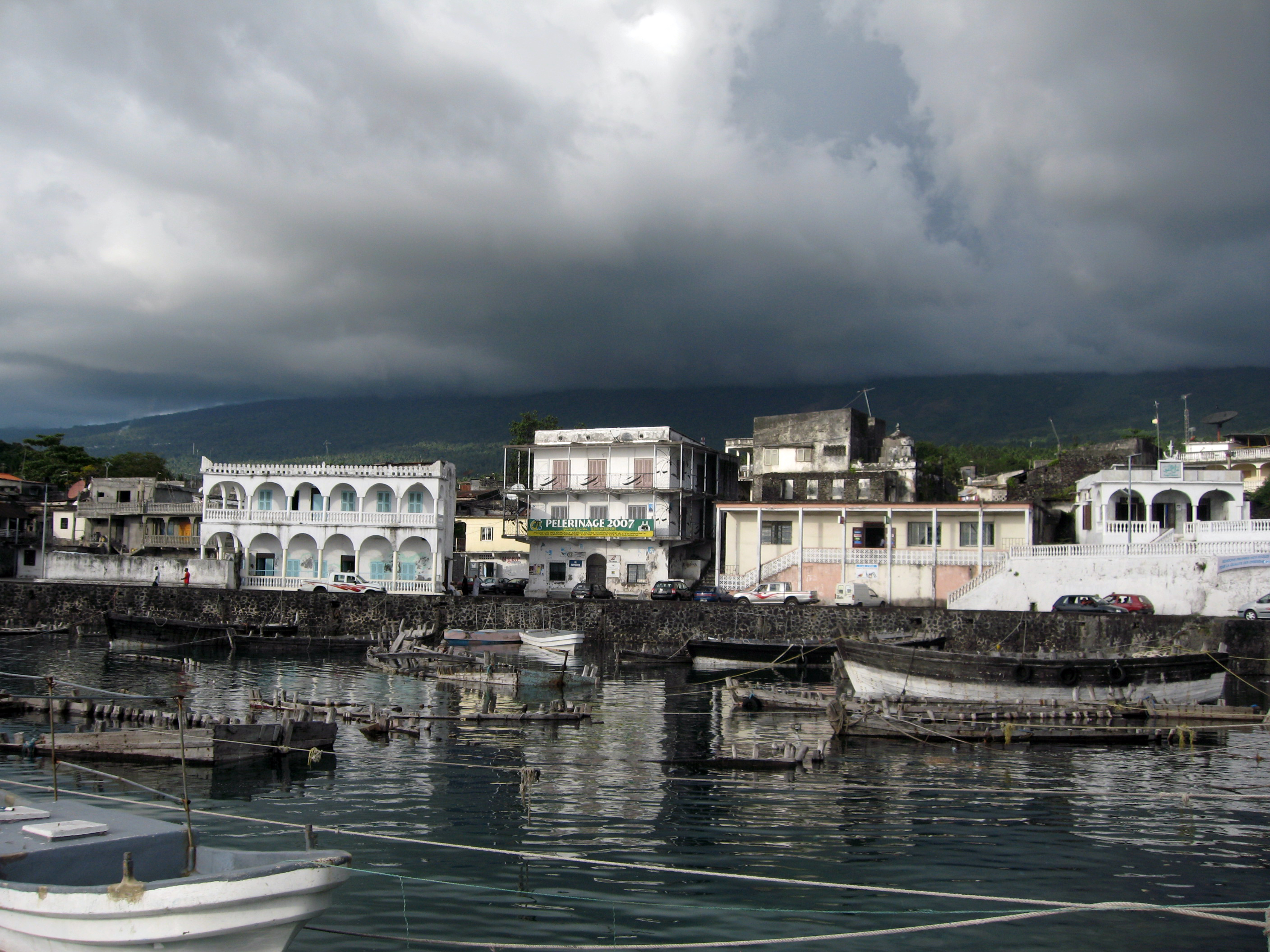
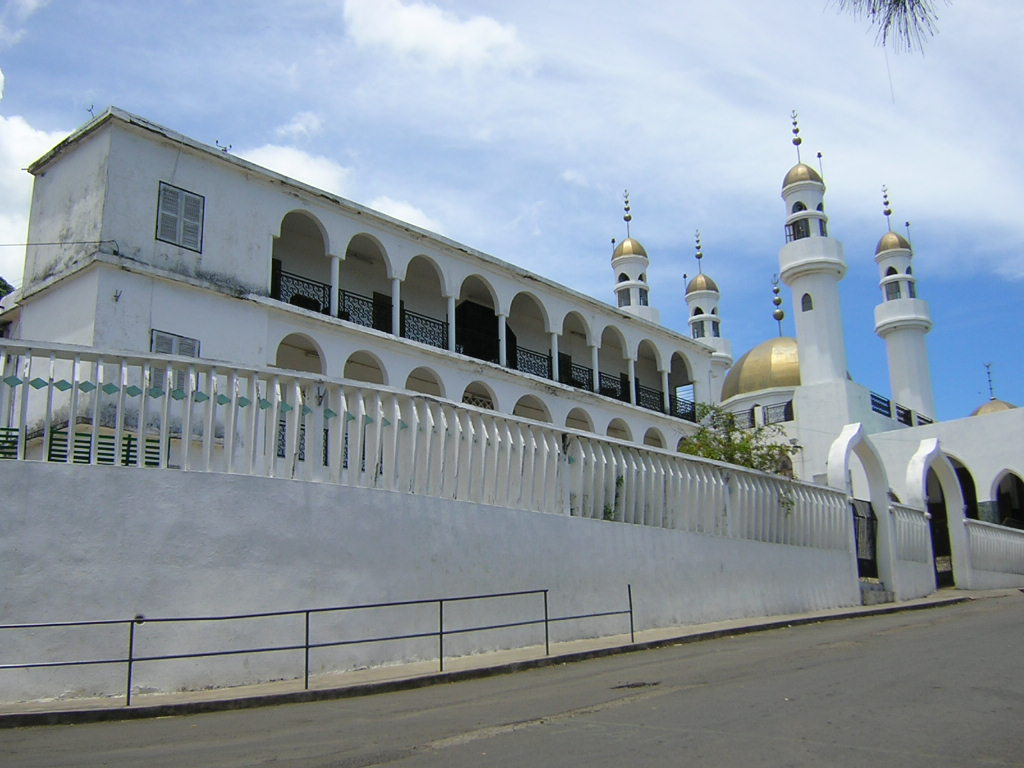
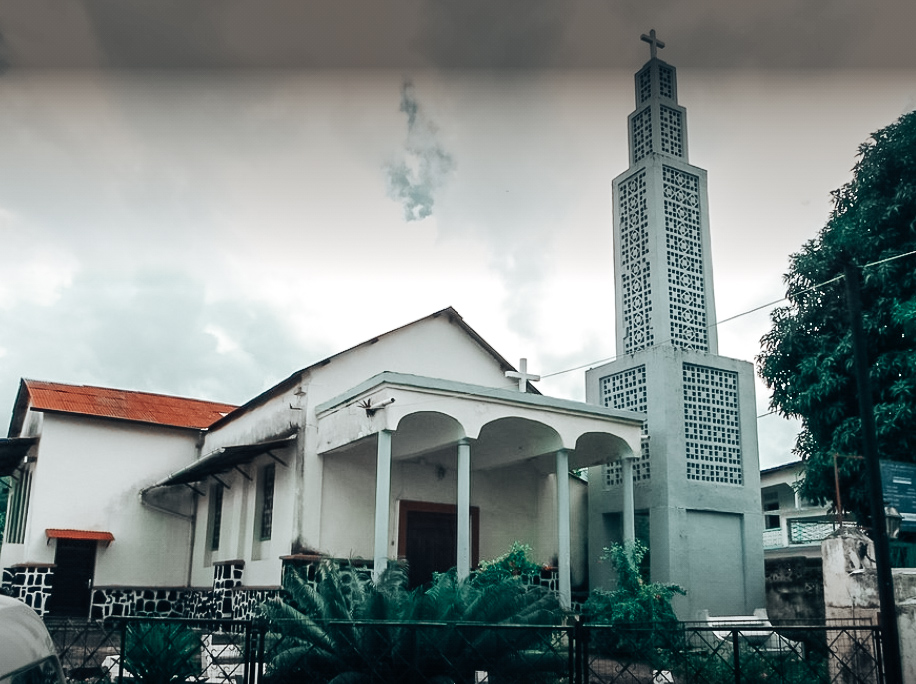
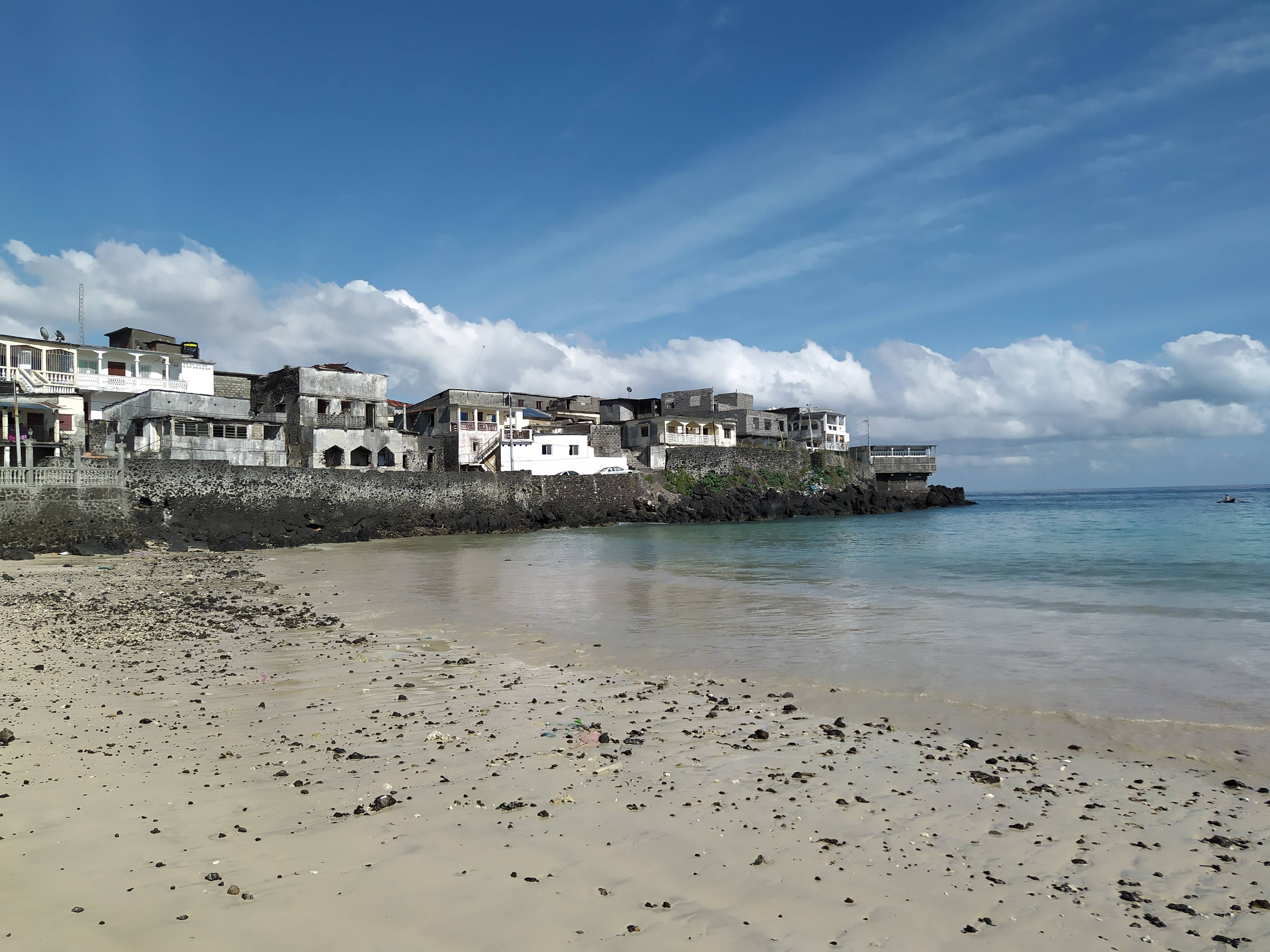
- (from top: left to right) Moroni in early July 2008, Mosque in Moroni, Moroni Catholic Church and Itsandra beach.

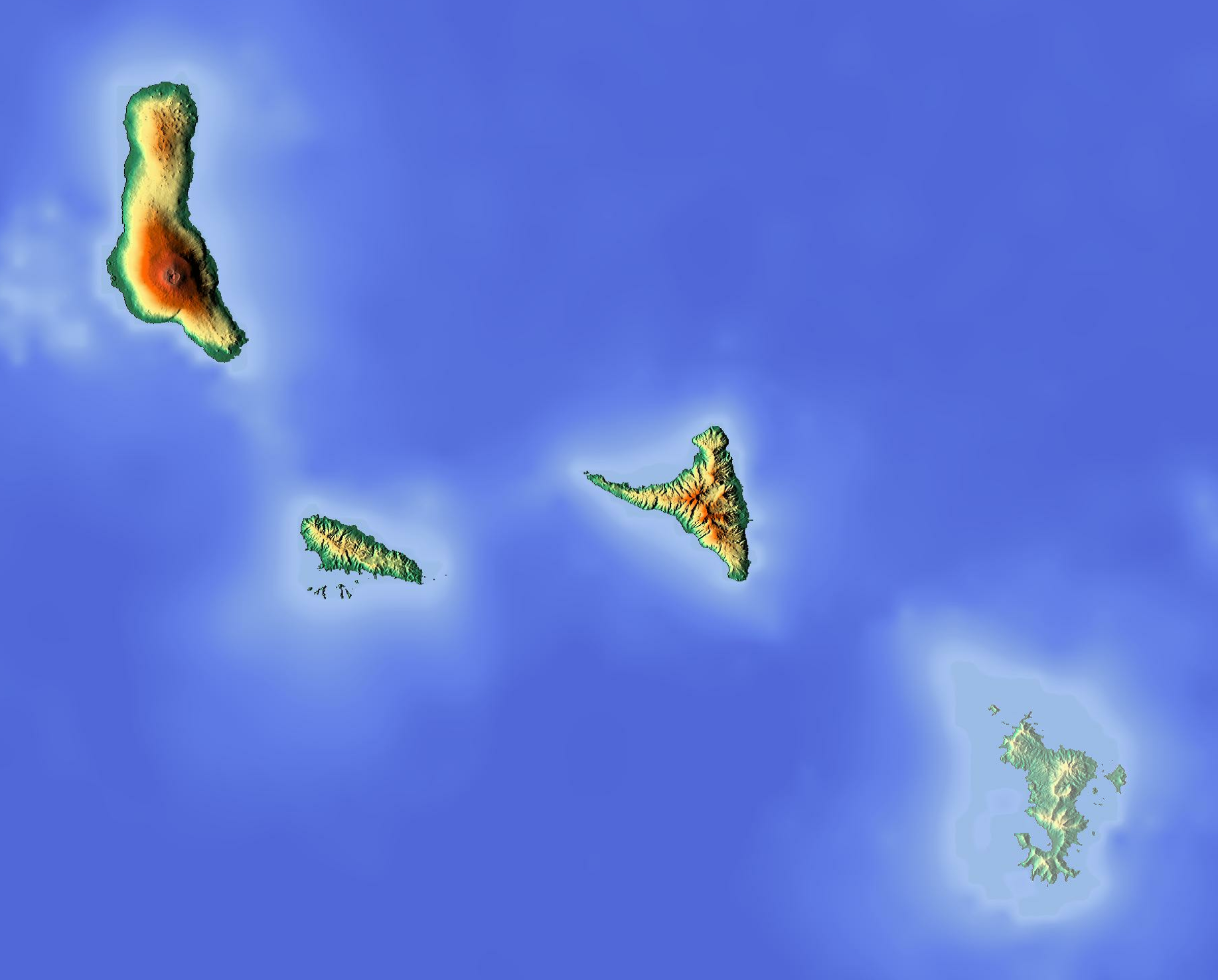
- Location of Moroni on the island of Grande Comore Moroni (Africa)
- Coordinates: 11.699°S 43.256°E
- Country: Comoros
- Island: Grande Comore

Area
  - Total: 30 km^{2} (12 sq mi)
- Elevation: 29 m (95 ft)

Population (2016)
  - Total: 111,326
  - Density: 3,700/km^{2} (9,600/sq mi)
- Time zone: UTC+03:00 (EAT)
- Area code: 269

UNESCO World Heritage Site
- Part of: The Medinas of the Historic Sultanates of the Comoros
- Criteria: Cultural: (iii)(iv)
- Reference: 1768
- Inscription: 2026 (48th Session)

Moroni (French pronunciation: [mɔʁɔni]; Arabic: موروني, romanized: Mūrūnī) is the largest city, national capital, and seat of the government of the Union of the Comoros, a sovereign archipelago nation in the Indian Ocean. Moroni means "at the river" (mroni in Shingazidja). Moroni is the capital of the semi-autonomous island of Ngazidja, the largest of the three main islands of the republic. The city's estimated population in 2003 was 41,557 residents. Moroni, which lies along the Route Nationale 1, has a port and several mosques such as the Badjanani Mosque.

== History ==
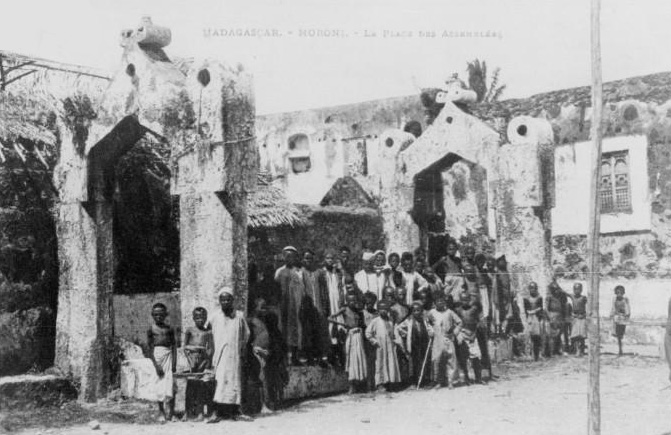
Moroni in 1908

The early history of Moroni is uncertain. The earliest written evidence for settlement in the Comoros Islands comes no earlier than the 7th century, possibly by Arab navigations and Bantu-speaking agriculturalists, while ceramic finds from the 7th to 10th century demonstrate that the Islands were part of the developing Swahili civilization, but when Moroni itself was first settled is not known.

By the middle of the second millennium, however, Moroni was a well-established town, engaged in trade networks throughout the Indian Ocean, and the Badjanani mosque, built in 1427, is a testament to the city's wealth, contemporary with the golden ages of other Swahili cities. Together with neighbouring port and royal capital Ikoni, Moroni was one of two centres of economic and political power of the kingdom of Bambao. Nevertheless, until the end of the nineteenth century, it was just one of many large towns on the island, and it wasn't until the Sultan of Bambao, Said Ali ibn Said Omar, negotiated a treaty of Protectorate with France in 1886 that his town became the seat of the colonial administration.

Moroni grew slowly through the twentieth century for, although it was now the capital of Ngazidja, it was not the seat of the territorial administration, which was located at Dzaoudzi on Mayotte, and in 1958 its population was still only 6,545. However, in that same year the decision was taken to move the capital of the archipelago from Dzaoudzi to Moroni, and the town slowly grew to become the largest in the country.

An agreement on broad autonomy to the three islands was refused by the Anjouan representatives which resulted in an eruption of violence affecting Moroni in April 1999, during which Colonel Azali Assoumani assumed power in a coup d'état. In December 2003, the Moroni Agreement on Transition Agreements was signed by the island presidents of the Union of Comoros. In the run-up to the 2006 elections, the government-owned Radio Ngazidja and private station Moroni FM were raided by armed assailants and forced off the air temporarily. In 2010, the U.S. Navy's Seabees constructed Hamramba School in Moroni as a humanitarian project, in partnership with the local military and Comoros' federal government; construction methods included mixing concrete by hand before using buckets and wheelbarrows to move the concrete to the school site.

== Geography ==
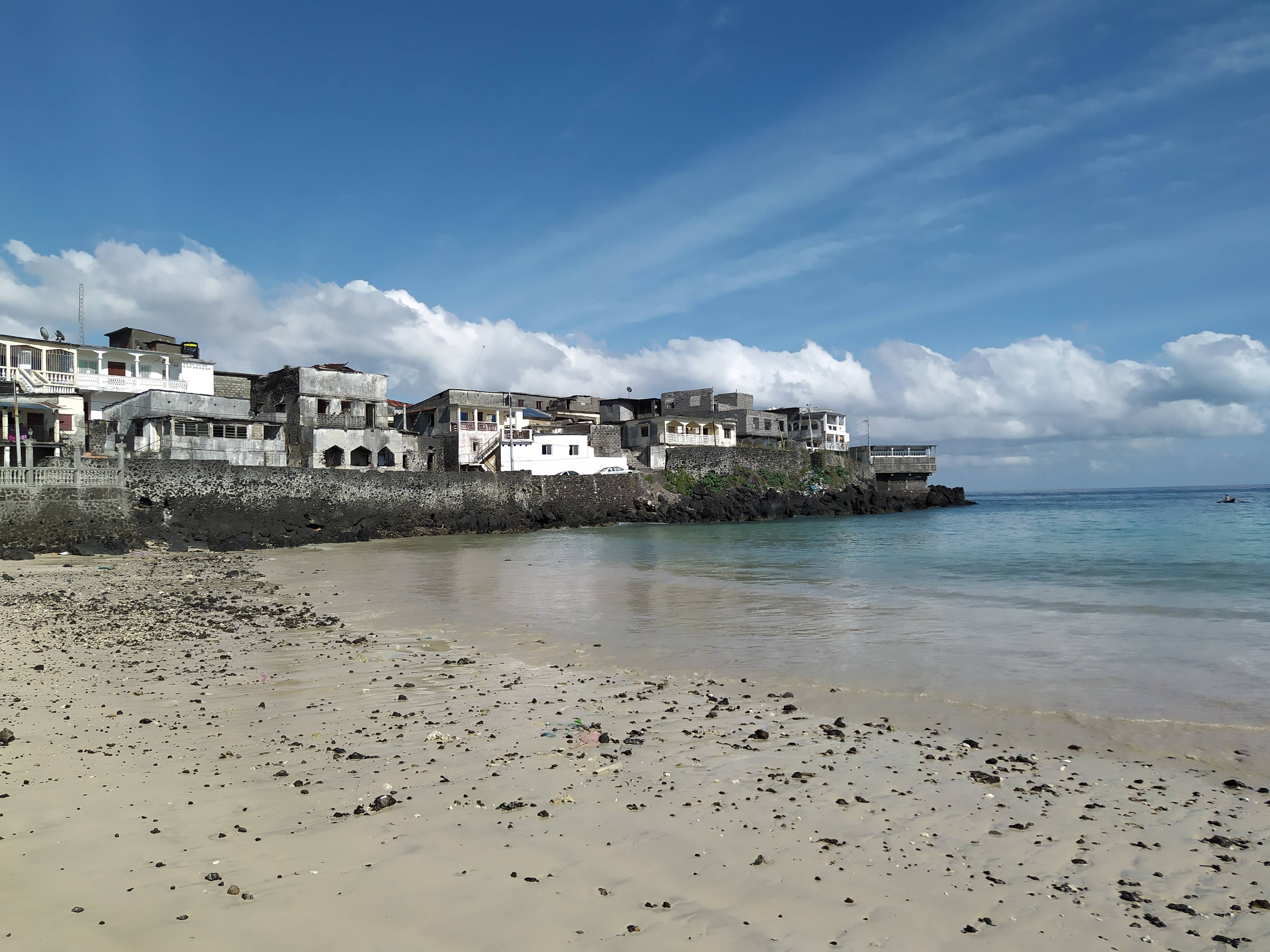
Itsandra beach

The city is on the western coast of Ngazidja. Moroni has a rocky volcanic coastline, mostly without beaches. Settlements to the north of Moroni include Itsandra, Ntsoudjini, Ouellah, Bahani, Batsa, Vanambouani and Vanadjou, and to the south are Ikoni, Mvouni, Daoueni and Séléa.

=== Landmarks ===
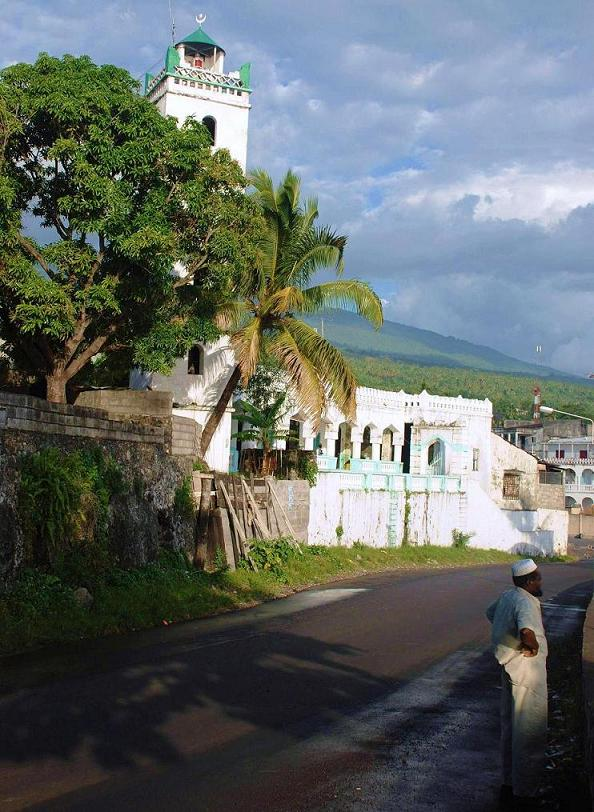
Badjanani Mosque

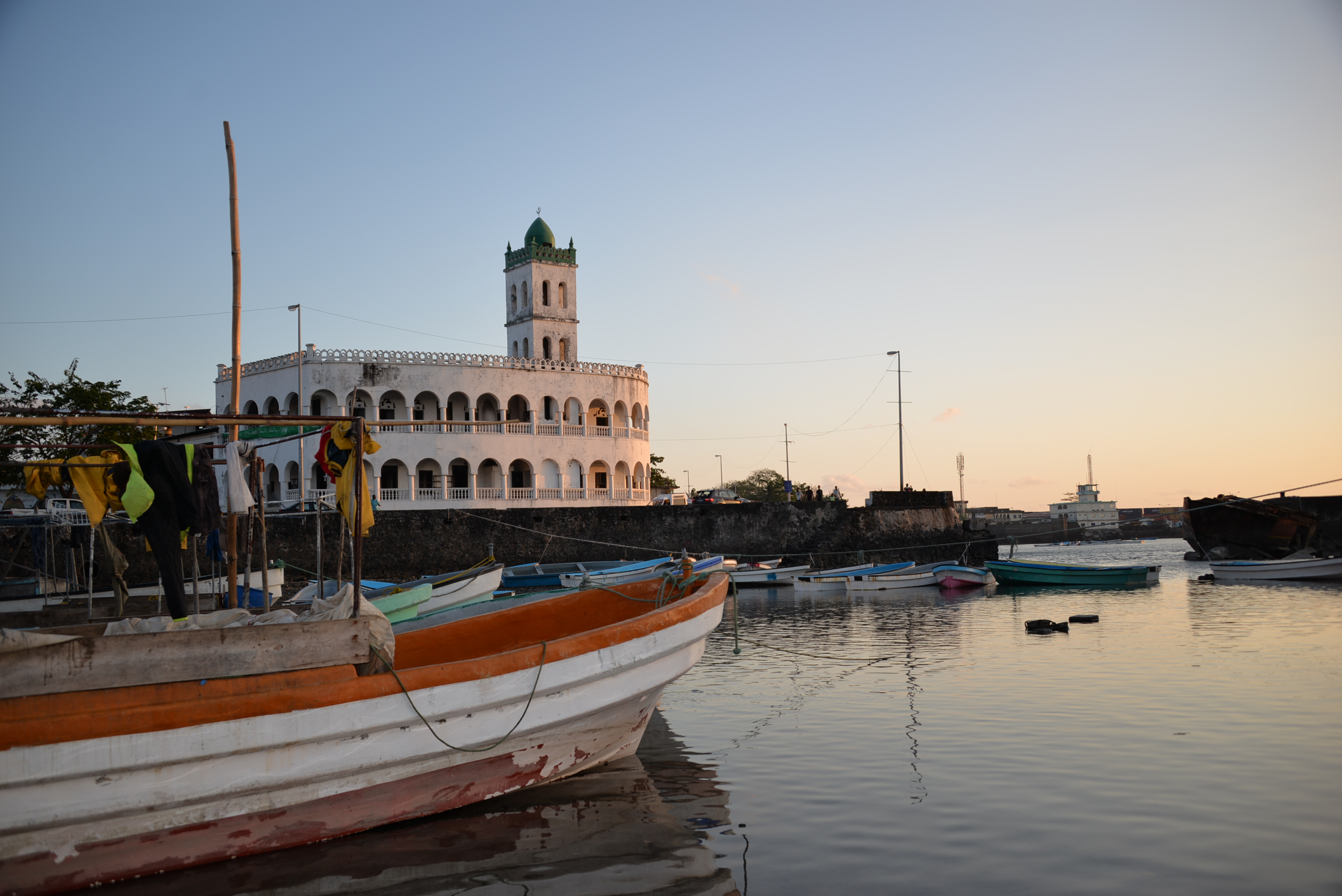
Friday Mosque view from the old port

The historic town centre, the Medina, contains a maze of narrow alleys and ancient buildings but is poorly maintained. The old city centre is similar to but smaller than the old town of Lamu. There are many mosques, notably the Badjanani Mosque or Ancienne Mosquée de Vendredi (old Friday mosque), which is the oldest mosque in the Medina. It was originally built in 1427, and a minaret was added in 1921. In 2026, the Medina of Moroni was inscribed as a UNESCO World Heritage Site, along with those of Ntsoudjini, Itsandra, Ikoni, Mutsamudu, and Domoni. The 300-seat theatre of the Alliance Franco-Comorienne serves as a venue for national and international performances, ceremonies, conferences, film screenings, and seminars. Other venues include the 700-seat Al-Kamar, the 500-seat Palais du Peuple, and the 300-seat Foyer des Jeunes de Foumbouni.

Moroni has a few hotels and nightclubs. The nearby Karthala volcano is also an attraction for hiking when the volcano is dormant.

=== Climate ===
Moroni features a tropical rainforest climate (Af), with generally heavy precipitation throughout the year—only October sees on average less than 100 mm (4 in) of rain (roughly 98 mm (3.9 in)). The average annual rainfall is 2,700 millimetres (110 in) and it rains during all months of the year. The monsoon season lasts from November to April. Humidity is in the range of 69 to 79 per cent. Moroni's average temperatures throughout the year are relatively constant with a high in the range of 32–34 °C (90–93 °F) and a low in the range of 14–20 °C (57–68 °F). The region experiences frequent cyclones and as the islands are located more than 10 degrees below the equator in the western part of the Indian Ocean, the climate is generally termed as "maritime tropical".

Climate data for Moroni, Comoros
Month	Jan	Feb	Mar	Apr	May	Jun	Jul	Aug	Sep	Oct	Nov	Dec	Year
Record high °C (°F)	34 (93)	34 (93)	35 (95)	34 (93)	33 (91)	32 (90)	31 (88)	31 (88)	31 (88)	33 (91)	34 (93)	36 (97)	36 (97)
Mean daily maximum °C (°F)	30.4 (86.7)	30.4 (86.7)	30.8 (87.4)	30.4 (86.7)	29.5 (85.1)	28.4 (83.1)	27.7 (81.9)	27.7 (81.9)	28.1 (82.6)	29.1 (84.4)	30.3 (86.5)	30.8 (87.4)	29.5 (85.1)
Mean daily minimum °C (°F)	23.4 (74.1)	23.3 (73.9)	23.0 (73.4)	22.6 (72.7)	21.2 (70.2)	19.6 (67.3)	18.8 (65.8)	18.4 (65.1)	19.0 (66.2)	20.3 (68.5)	21.6 (70.9)	22.6 (72.7)	21.2 (70.2)
Record low °C (°F)	20 (68)	20 (68)	20 (68)	20 (68)	17 (63)	14 (57)	14 (57)	14 (57)	15 (59)	16 (61)	18 (64)	19 (66)	14 (57)
Average rainfall mm (inches)	364 (14.3)	293 (11.5)	279 (11.0)	316 (12.4)	256 (10.1)	266 (10.5)	244 (9.6)	150 (5.9)	108 (4.3)	97 (3.8)	108 (4.3)	219 (8.6)	2,700 (106.3)
Average rainy days	18	16	18	18	12	12	12	10	11	12	12	16	167
Average relative humidity (%)	79	77	76	74	69	66	65	65	70	73	69	72	71
Mean monthly sunshine hours	187	177	225	192	232	231	236	232	221	237	230	212	2,612
Source 1: World Meteorological Organization
Source 2: BBC weather, Danish Meteorological Institute (sun and relative humidity, 1931–1960)

==== Mount Karthala ====
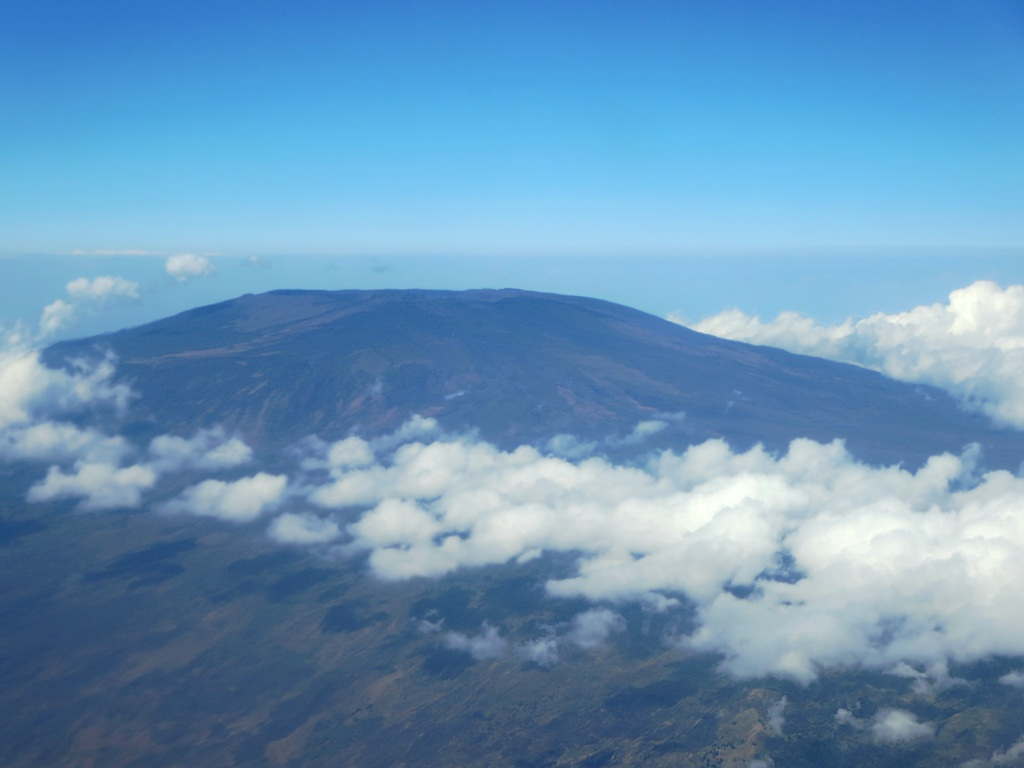
Mount Karthala

Moroni is situated at the foot of Mount Karthala, 10 kilometres (6 miles) northwest of the volcano's crater. The 2,361-metre (7,746 ft) high active volcano is reported to be one of the largest active volcanoes in the world, with a diameter of about 1 mile (1.6 km), and erupting approximately every eleven years over the past two hundred years. The eruption of 2005 caused displacement of a large number of people due to volcanic ash.

==== Wildlife ====
The volcano which forms the backdrop of Moroni city has numerous bird species including Comoro pigeon, Karthala scops owl, Comoro cuckoo-roller, Comoro drongo, Comoro thrush, Comoro bulbul, Humblot's flycatcher, Comoro cuckoo-shrike, Kirk's white-eye, Karthala white-eye, Comoro brush-warbler, Comoro green sunbird, and Comoro fody.

== Demographics ==
As of 2011, Moroni had a population of about 54,000. Sunni Muslims account for 98%, and there is a minority of Roman Catholics. The official languages of the Comoros are Shikomori (a Bantu language closely related to Swahili), Arabic and French.

== Places of worship ==
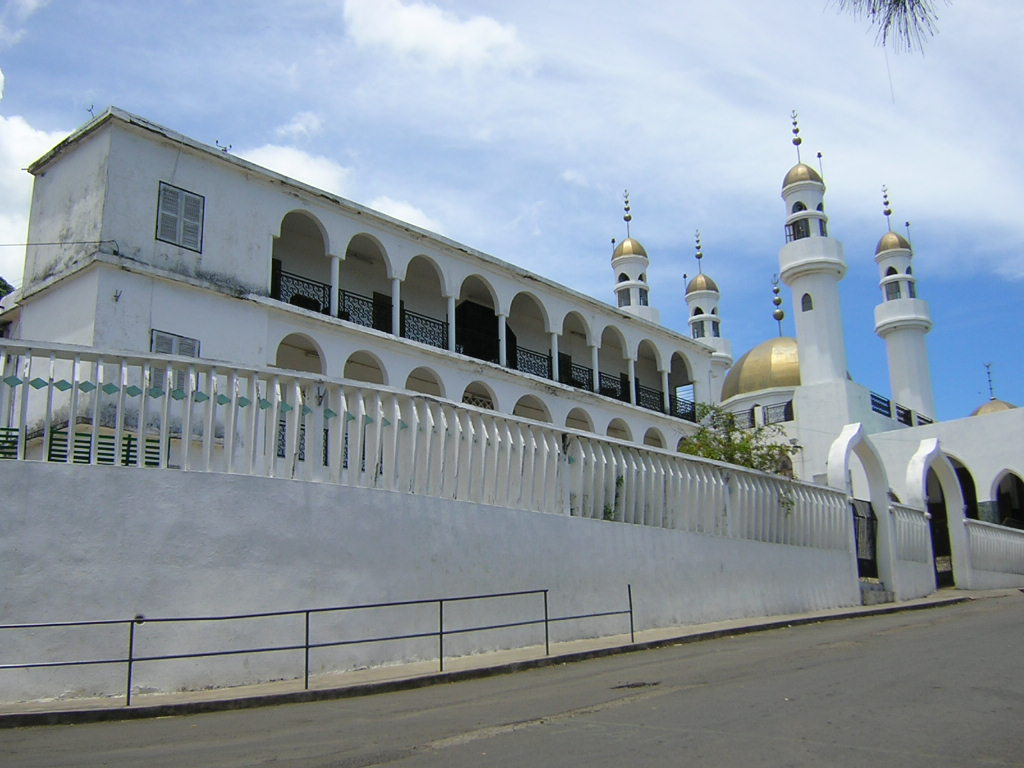
Mosque in Moroni

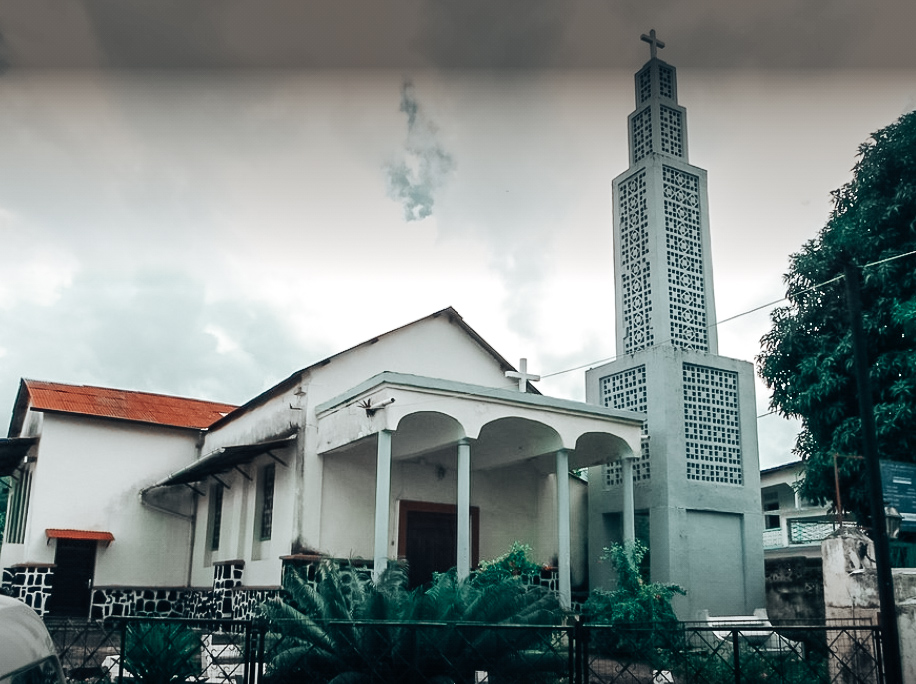
Catholic Church in Moroni

Among the places of worship, they are predominantly Muslim mosques. There are also Christian churches and temples : Apostolic Vicariate of the Comoros Archipelago (Catholic Church), Protestant churches, Evangelical Churches.

== Economy ==
Goods produced on the island are vanilla, soft drinks, processed and distilled essential oils, metal and wood products, and processed pozzolana (cement); these are exported from the port. The tourist infrastructure is poorly developed. Financial institutions include Banque Centrale des Comores, Banque de Development des Comores, and Banque pour Industries et le Commerce. There are several markets in Moroni, including the old market and the larger market at Volo Volo in the north of the city.

== Transport ==
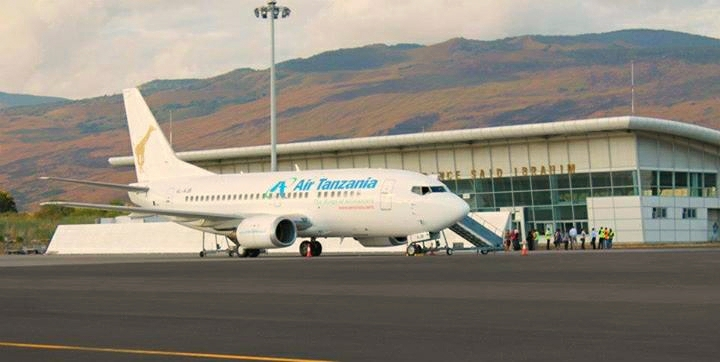
Prince Said Ibrahim International Airport

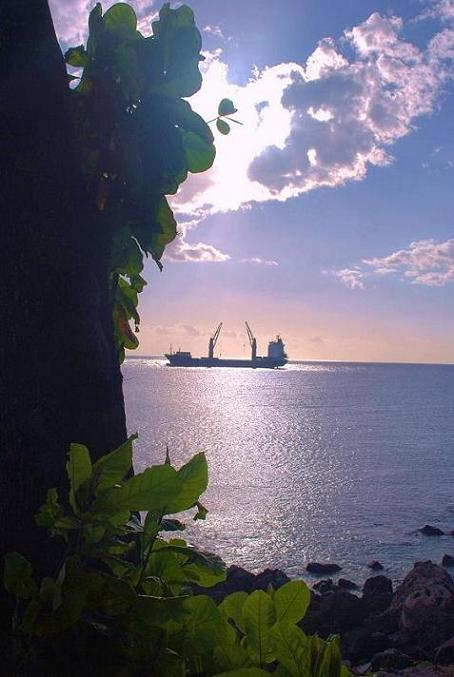
Moroni Harbour

The country's civil aviation authority, Ministère des Postes et Télécommunications de la Promotion des Nouvelles Technologies de l'Information et de la Communication chargé des Transports et du Tourisme, is located in Moroni, as is the National Agency of Civil Aviation and Meteorology. Moroni is served by the Prince Said Ibrahim International Airport, located at Hahaya, about 15 km (9 mi) north of the town. However, there are no direct flights to Europe. It is a civilian airport at an elevation of 28 m (92 ft) and has a paved runway which has dimensions of 2,900 by 45 metres (9,514 ft × 148 ft). Airlines which operate international flights to this airport are Ethiopian airlines, Air Tanzania, Air Austral and Kenya Airways. However, between the islands, the local airlines, Int'Air Iles and AB Aviation operate.

On 30 June 2009, Yemenia Flight 626, en route from Yemen to Moroni, crashed into the Indian Ocean with 153 passengers and crew on board, many from France.

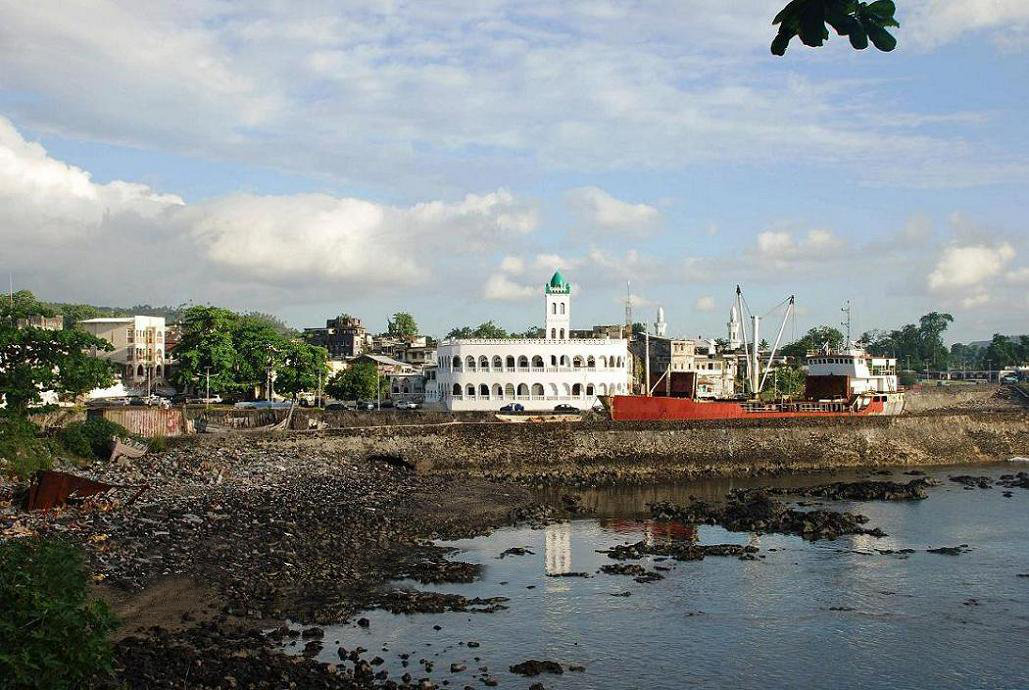
Moroni Port in the foreground

There is a major harbour though small in size with regular transport to the African mainland and the other islands in the Comoros archipelago, as well as Madagascar and other Indian Ocean islands. The port is a small quay of 80 metres (260 ft) with a draught of 3.5 metres (11 ft), and hence is not suitable for large ships to enter as coral reefs pose a threat to safety. It supports a maximum vessel size of 150 metres (490 ft). The channel depth is 24.4 metres (80 ft), with an anchorage depth of 23.2 metres (76 ft), a cargo pier depth of 4.9 metres (16 ft) and a terminal depth of 4.9 metres (16 ft). Within the harbour's mini industrial zone, a local container terminal was managed by Gulfcom Port Management SA between 2006 and 2012, after which Bolloré Africa Logistics won the concession and will partner with Cofipri, a Luxembourg investment company. Storage facilities such as warehouses have been established to facilitate imports and exports and also for petroleum storage.

== Notable people ==
- Hayatte Abdou, journalist
