= La Grille =

Volcano on Grande Comore, Comoros

Coordinates: 11.47°S 43.33°E

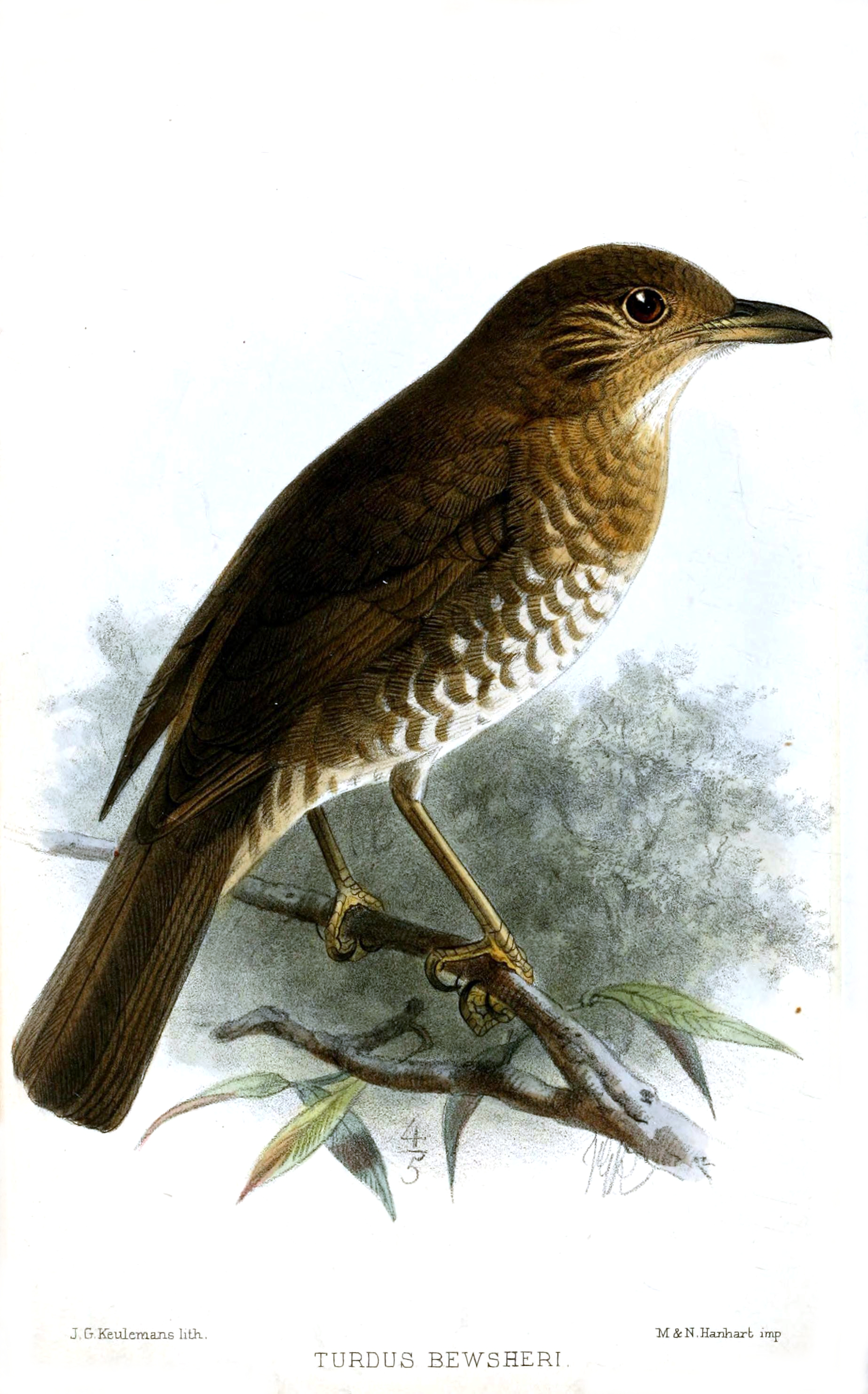
Comoro thrushes live in the IBA

La Grille is a volcano in the Comoros archipelago on the island of Grande Comore (also known as Ngazidja).

== Description ==
La Grille is a shield volcano at the northern end of island and lacks a summit caldera like its larger and more well-known neighbour to the south, Karthala volcano. The basaltic La Grille volcano also differs from Karthala in its abundance of pyroclastic cones up to 800 m (2,625 ft) in height. The cones were erupted along fissures running parallel to the summit ridge, which has an irregular profile and is elongated in a north-south direction, and from radial fissures that reach as far as the coast. Although the exact date of the last eruption of La Grille is unknown, lava flows covering its sides and not yet recolonized by vegetation suggest that the volcano last erupted only a few hundred years ago. Recent lava flows, some possibly as young as a few hundred years, have reached the sea from fissures on the lower western, northern, and eastern flanks.

== Geography ==
La Grille is located on the island of Grande Comore, a northern island of the Comoros archipelago in the Mozambique Channel in the Indian Ocean. The volcano is abutted on the south by Karthala, another volcano rising to 2,361 m (7,746 ft) meters. A road around the coast of Grande Comore runs along the east, north and west sides of La Grille, connecting Prince Said Ibrahim Airport to the west of the island. Many villages are located near the coast and on the volcano, where there are also electricity pylons.

La Grille appears as a mountain range running from north to south, reaching a slag height of 800 m (2,625 ft) meters on average, and covered in stratovolcano cones, giving the volcano a maximum altitude of 1,087 m (3,566 ft) meters. Unlike its neighbour Karthala, La Grille does not have caldera. Different eruptive vents are located along the fissures that run along the volcano from north to south, parallel to the ridge of the mountain, and other cracks along the coast. Lava basalt sometimes escapes from these eruptive vents, sometimes reaching the sea to the east, north and west sides of the volcano. Many lava flows are still visible as few are rapidly recolonized by tropical Coconut trees on the island.

=== Important Bird Area ===
An 8,725 ha tract encompassing the higher slopes and summit of the mountain has been designated an Important Bird Area (IBA) by BirdLife International because it supports populations of Comoro olive pigeons, Comoro blue pigeons, Malagasy harriers, Grand Comoro brush warblers, Grand Comoro bulbuls, Comoro thrushes, Humblot's sunbirds and red-headed fodies.
