= Geography of the Comoros =

Coordinates: 12°10′S 44°15′E

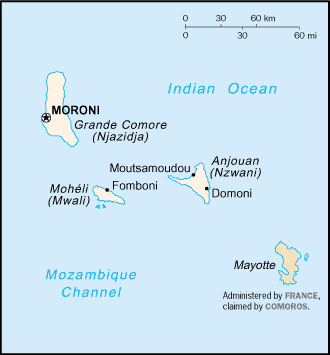
Map of all islands

Location of Comoros (in circle)

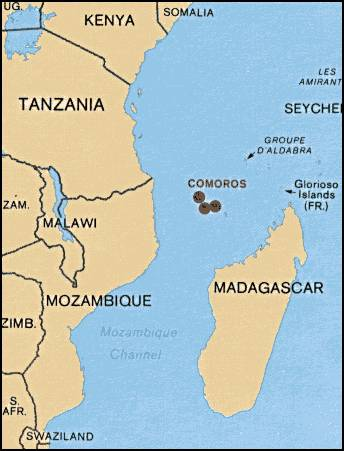
Map of Comoros and Southern Africa

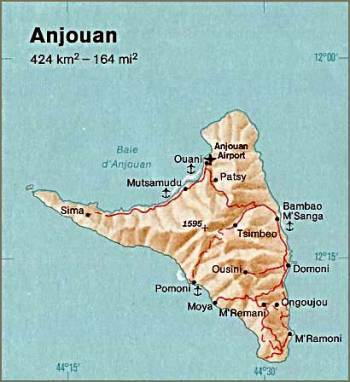
Map of Anjouan

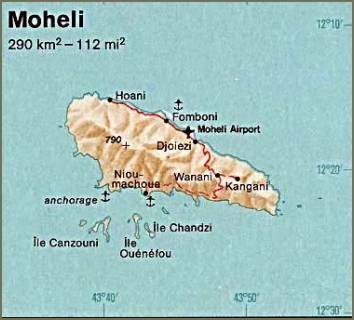
Map of Moheli

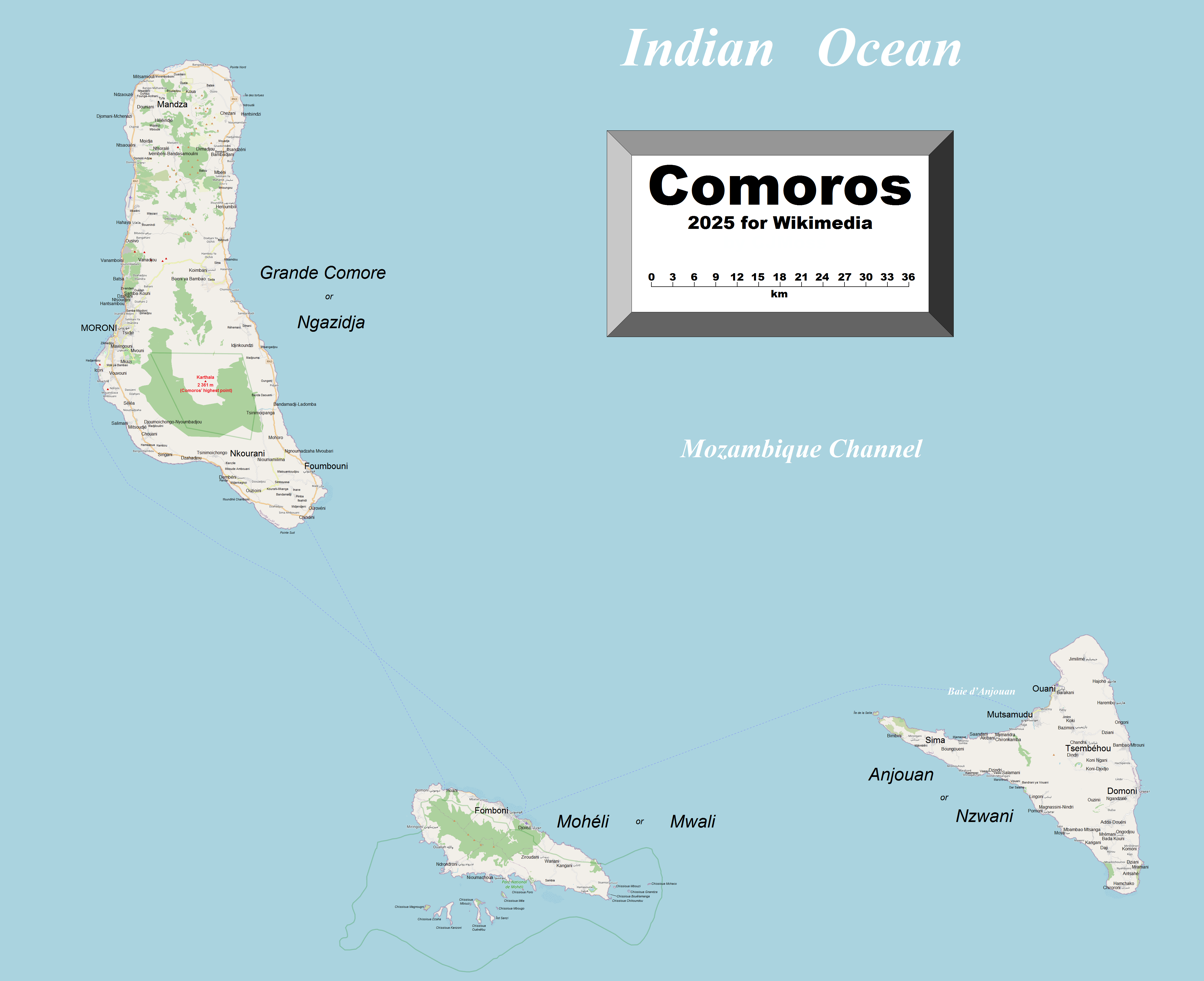
Detailed map of the Comoros

The Comoros archipelago consists of four main islands aligned along a northwest–southeast axis at the north end of the Mozambique Channel, between Mozambique and the island of Madagascar. Still widely known by their French names, the islands officially have been called by their Swahili names by the Comorian government. They are Grande Comore (Njazidja), Mohéli (Mwali), Anjouan (Nzwani), and Mayotte (Mahoré). The islands' distance from each other—Grande Comore is some 200 kilometers from Mayotte, forty kilometers from Mohéli, and eighty kilometers from Anjouan—along with a lack of good harbor facilities, make transportation and communication difficult. Comoros are sunny islands.

== Details ==
The islands have a total land area of 2,236 square kilometers (including Mayotte), and claim territorial waters of 320 square kilometers. Mount Karthala (2316 m) on Grande Comore is an active volcano. From April 17 to 19, 2005, the volcano began spewing ash and gas, forcing as many as 10,000 people to flee. Comoros is located within the Somali Plate.

== Grande Comore ==
Grande Comore is the largest island, sixty-seven kilometers long and twenty-seven kilometers wide, with a total area of 1,146 square kilometers. The most recently formed of the four islands in the archipelago, it is also of volcanic origin. Two volcanoes form the island's most prominent topographic features: La Grille in the north, with an elevation of 1,000 meters, is extinct and largely eroded; Kartala in the south, rising to a height of 2,361 meters, last erupted in 1977. A plateau averaging 600 to 700 meters high connects the two mountains. Because Grande Comore is geologically a relatively new island, its soil is thin and rocky and cannot hold water. As a result, water from the island's heavy rainfall must be stored in catchment tanks. There are no coral reefs along the coast, and the island lacks a good harbor for ships. One of the largest remnants of the Comoros' once-extensive rain forests is on the slopes of Kartala. The national capital has been at Moroni since 1962.

== Anjouan ==
Anjouan, triangular shaped and forty kilometers from apex to base, has an area of 424 square kilometers. Three mountain chains — Sima, Nioumakele, and Jimilime—emanate from a central peak, Mtingui (1,575 m), giving the island its distinctive shape. Older than Grande Comore, Anjouan has deeper soil cover, but overcultivation has caused serious erosion. A coral reef lies close to shore; the island's capital of Mutsamudu is also its main port.

== Mohéli ==
Mohéli is thirty kilometers long and twelve kilometers wide, with an area of 290 square kilometers. It is the smallest of the four islands and has a central mountain chain reaching 860 meters at its highest. Like Grande Comore, it retains stands of rain forest. Mohéli's capital is Fomboni.

== Mayotte ==
Mayotte, geologically the oldest of the four islands, is thirty-nine kilometers long and twenty-two kilometers wide, totaling 375 square kilometers, and its highest points are between 500 and 600 meters above sea level. Because of greater weathering of the volcanic rock, the soil is relatively rich in some areas. A well-developed coral reef that encircles much of the island ensures protection for ships and a habitat for fish. Dzaoudzi, capital of the Comoros until 1962 and now Mayotte's administrative center, is situated on a rocky outcropping off the east shore of the main island. Dzaoudzi is linked by a causeway to le Pamanzi, which at ten kilometers in area is the largest of several islets adjacent to Mayotte. Islets are also scattered in the coastal waters of Mayotte just as in Grande Comore, Anjouan, and Mohéli.

== Flora and fauna ==
Comorian waters are the habitat of the coelacanth, a rare fish with limblike fins and a cartilaginous skeleton, the fossil remains of which date as far back as 400 million years and which was once thought to have become extinct about 70 million years ago. A live specimen was caught in 1938 off southern Africa; other coelacanths have since been found in the vicinity of the Comoro Islands.

Several mammals are unique to the islands themselves. Livingstone's fruit bat, although plentiful when discovered by explorer David Livingstone in 1863, has been reduced to a population of about 120, entirely on Anjouan. The world's largest bat, the jet-black Livingstone fruit bat has a wingspan of nearly two meters. A British preservation group sent an expedition to the Comoros in 1992 to bring some of the bats to Britain to establish a breeding population.

A hybrid of the common brown lemur (Eulemur fulvus) originally from Madagascar, was introduced by humans prior to European colonization and is found on Mayotte. The mongoose lemur (Eulemur mongoz), also introduced from Madagascar by humans, can be found on the islands of Mohéli and Anjouan.

22 species of bird are unique to the archipelago and 17 of these are restricted to the Union of the Comoros. These include the Karthala scops-owl, Anjouan scops-owl and Humblot's flycatcher.

Partly in response to international pressures, Comorians in the 1990s have become more concerned about the environment. Steps are being taken not only to preserve the rare fauna, but also to counteract degradation of the environment, especially on densely populated Anjouan. Specifically, to minimize the cutting down of trees for fuel, kerosene is being subsidized, and efforts are being made to replace the loss of the forest cover caused by ylang-ylang distillation for perfume. The Community Development Support Fund, sponsored by the International Development Association (IDA, a World Bank affiliate) and the Comorian government, is working to improve water supply on the islands as well.

== Climate ==
The climate is marine tropical, with two seasons: hot and humid from November to April, the result of the northeastern monsoon, and a cooler, drier season the rest of the year. Average monthly temperatures range from 23 to 28 °C (73.4 to 82.4 °F) along the coasts. Although the average annual precipitation is 2,000 millimeters (78.7 in), water is a scarce commodity in many parts of the Comoros. Mohéli and Mayotte possess streams and other natural sources of water, but Grande Comore and Anjouan, whose mountainous landscapes retain water poorly, are almost devoid of naturally occurring running water. Cyclones, occurring during the hot and wet season, can cause extensive damage, especially in coastal areas. On the average, at least twice each decade houses, farms, and harbor facilities are devastated by these great storms.

=== Tropical cyclones ===
Due to their low latitude, the islands are rarely affected by tropical cyclones. However, several cyclones have had damaging and deadly effects. Cyclones in December 1905 and again in December 1906 led to a famine that killed 490 people between August 1905 and January 1906. A tropical cyclone in 1950 killed 585 people while moving through Anjouan and Moheli, injuring 70,000 others. The cyclone left 40,000 people homeless, and also caused ₣3.5 worth of damage to crops and infrastructure.

=== Weather ===
Climate data for Moroni, Comoros
| Month | Jan | Feb | Mar | Apr | May | Jun | Jul | Aug | Sep | Oct | Nov | Dec | Year |
|---|---|---|---|---|---|---|---|---|---|---|---|---|---|
| Record high °C (°F) | 34 (93) | 34 (93) | 35 (95) | 34 (93) | 33 (91) | 32 (90) | 31 (88) | 31 (88) | 31 (88) | 33 (91) | 34 (93) | 36 (97) | 36 (97) |
| Mean daily maximum °C (°F) | 30.4 (86.7) | 30.4 (86.7) | 30.8 (87.4) | 30.4 (86.7) | 29.5 (85.1) | 28.4 (83.1) | 27.7 (81.9) | 27.7 (81.9) | 28.1 (82.6) | 29.1 (84.4) | 30.3 (86.5) | 30.8 (87.4) | 29.5 (85.1) |
| Mean daily minimum °C (°F) | 23.4 (74.1) | 23.3 (73.9) | 23.0 (73.4) | 22.6 (72.7) | 21.2 (70.2) | 19.6 (67.3) | 18.8 (65.8) | 18.4 (65.1) | 19.0 (66.2) | 20.3 (68.5) | 21.6 (70.9) | 22.6 (72.7) | 21.2 (70.2) |
| Record low °C (°F) | 20 (68) | 20 (68) | 20 (68) | 20 (68) | 17 (63) | 14 (57) | 14 (57) | 14 (57) | 15 (59) | 16 (61) | 18 (64) | 19 (66) | 14 (57) |
| Average rainfall mm (inches) | 364 (14.3) | 293 (11.5) | 279 (11.0) | 316 (12.4) | 256 (10.1) | 266 (10.5) | 244 (9.6) | 150 (5.9) | 108 (4.3) | 97 (3.8) | 108 (4.3) | 219 (8.6) | 2,700 (106.3) |
| Average rainy days | 18 | 16 | 18 | 18 | 12 | 12 | 12 | 10 | 11 | 12 | 12 | 16 | 167 |
| Average relative humidity (%) | 79 | 77 | 76 | 74 | 69 | 66 | 65 | 65 | 70 | 73 | 69 | 72 | 71 |
| Mean monthly sunshine hours | 187 | 177 | 225 | 192 | 232 | 231 | 236 | 232 | 221 | 237 | 230 | 212 | 2,612 |
Source 1: World Meteorological Organization
Source 2: BBC weather, Danish Meteorological Institute (sun and relative humidity, 1931–1960)

== Extreme points ==
This is a list of the extreme points of the Comoros, the points that are farther north, south, east or west than any other location. This list excludes the French-administered island of Mayotte which is claimed by the Comorian government.

- Northernmost point – unnamed headland north-west of Bangoua Kouni, Grande Comore
- Easternmost point – unnamed peninsula east of Domoni, Anjouan
- Southernmost point - unnamed headland on Île Canzouni, Mohéli
- Westernmost point - unnamed headland west of Iconi, Grande Comore

== Statistics ==
Area: 2,235 km^{2}

Coastline: 340 km

Climate: tropical marine; rainy season (November to May)

Terrain: volcanic islands, interiors vary from steep mountains to low hills

Elevation extremes:
lowest point: Indian Ocean 0 m
highest point: Karthala 2,360 m

Natural resources: fish

Land use:
arable land: 47.29%
permanent crops: 29.55%
other: 23.16% (2012 est.)

Irrigated land: 1.3 km^{2} (2003)

Total renewable water resources: 1.2 km^{3} (2011)

Freshwater withdrawal (domestic/industrial/agricultural):
total: 0.01 km^{3}/yr (48%/5%/47%)
per capital: 16.86 m^{3}/yr (1999)

Natural hazards: cyclones possible during rainy season (December to April); volcanic activity on Grand Comore

Environmental - current issues: soil degradation and erosion results from crop cultivation on slopes without proper terracing; deforestation
