= Séléa =

Town in the Comoros

Coordinates: 11.787039°S 43.270998°E

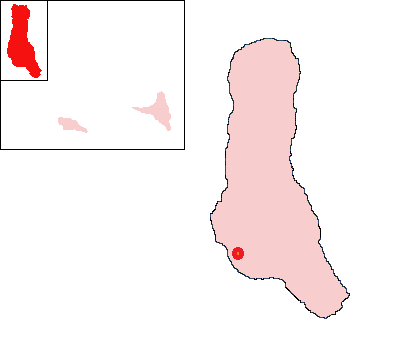
Location of Séléa on the island of Grande Comore

Séléa Bambao, the village of Selea-Bambo, is situated in the Bambao region in Grande Comore, Comoros. Bambao is a well-known region of Grande Comore, and it contains the largest region of the Grande Comore. The capital of Grande Comore, Moroni, is located in the Bambao region.

== Geography ==
Bambao, also referred to as Bambao Mtrouni, consists of sixteen villages. The villages lie linearly along the sea, as well as in the mountainous regions. Most of Bambao is rural and comprises farmland and forest. However, deforestation of the land for housing threatens the local environment.

Near the center of the isle lies Mount Karthala which stands over 7,700 feet (2,300 meters) tall.

Grande Comore has an area of 443 square miles (1,150 square kilometers). The northern area of the island (two thirds) is dominated by rocky plains also known as La Grille.

Selea-Bambao is relatively small with a population of around 4500 inhabitants.
