= Mount Karthala =

Volcano in Comoro Islands

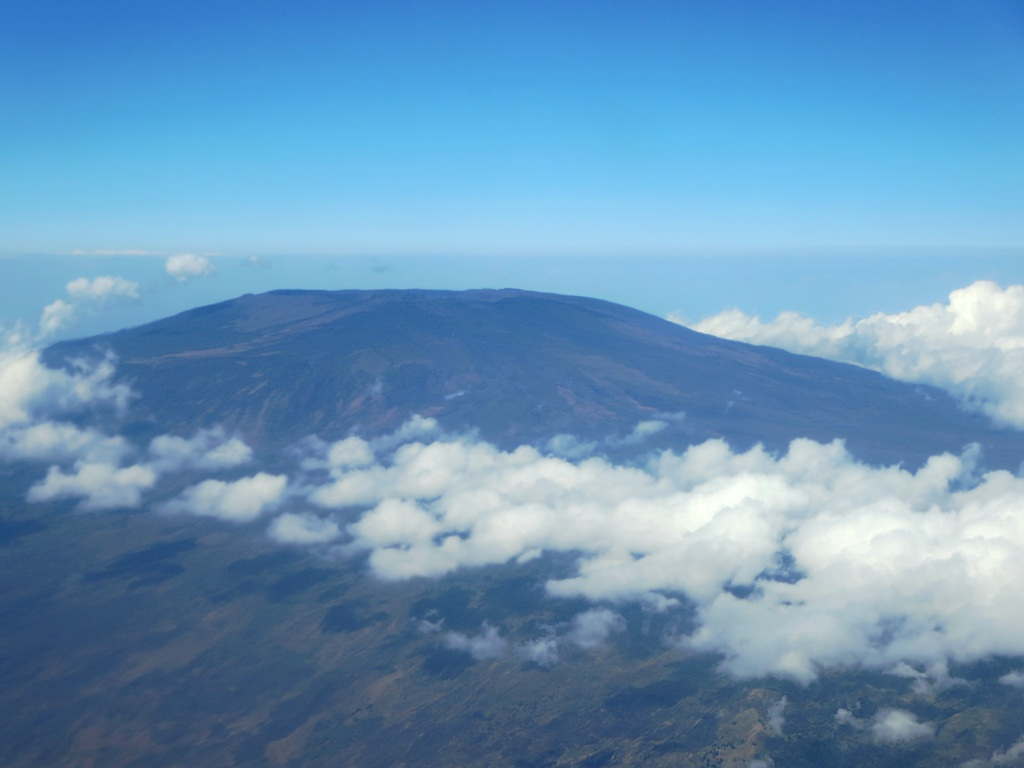
- Mount Karthala aerial view.

Highest point
- Elevation: 2,361 m (7,746 ft)
- Prominence: 2,361 m (7,746 ft)
- Listing: Ultra; Country high point
- Coordinates: 11°45′37″S 43°21′11″E

Geography
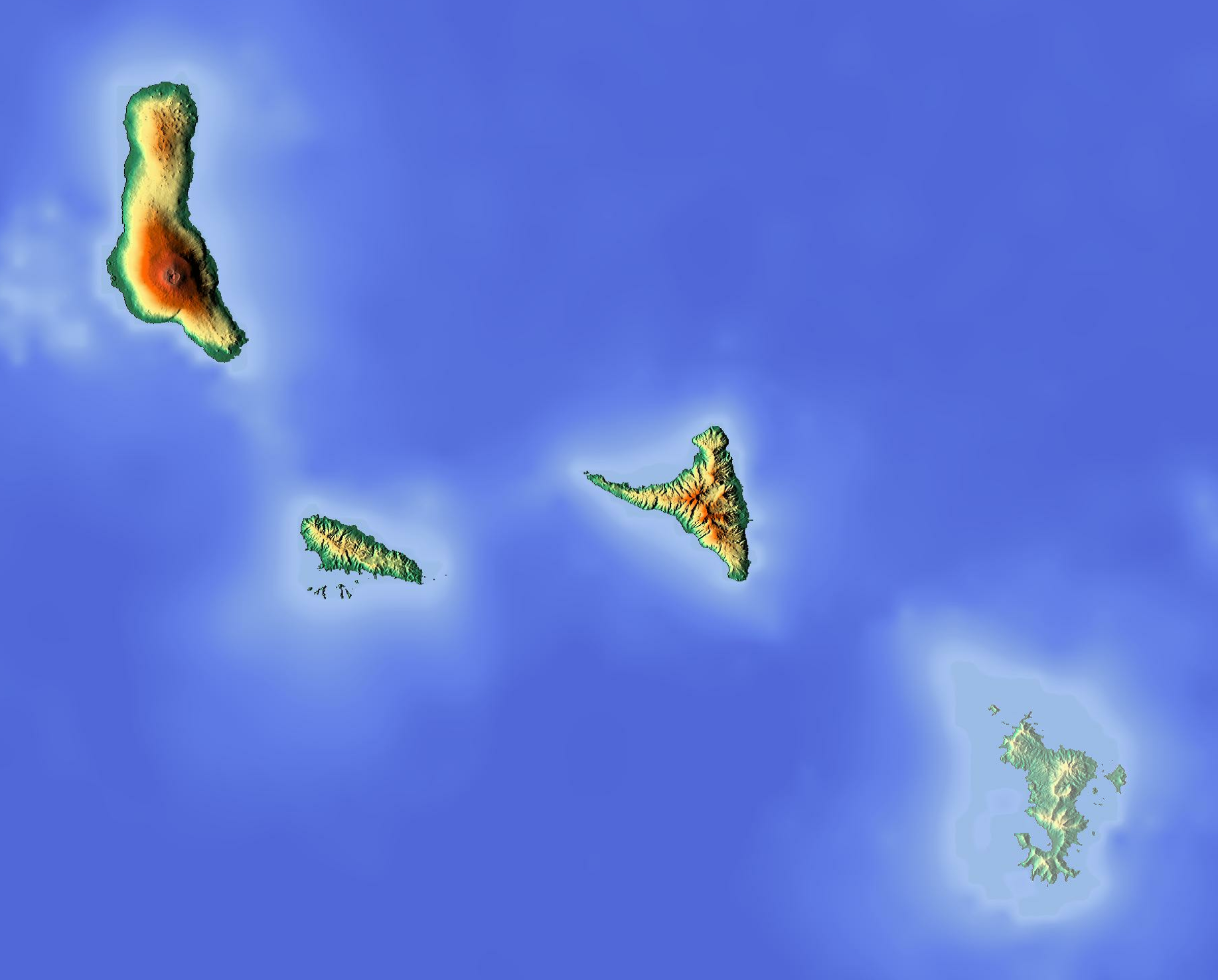
- Location within Comoros
- Country: Comoros
- Island: Grande Comore

Geology
- Mountain type: Shield volcano (active)
- Last eruption: January 2007

Ramsar Wetland
- Official name: Le Karthala
- Designated: 12 November 2006
- Reference no.: 1649

Mount Karthala or Karthola (Arabic: القرطالة Al Qirṭālah) is an active shield volcano and the highest point of the Comoros at 2,361 m (7,746 ft) above sea level. It is the southernmost and larger of the two volcanoes forming Grande Comore island, the largest island in the nation of Comoros. The Karthala volcano is very active, having erupted more than 20 times since the 19th century. Frequent eruptions have shaped the volcano's 3 km by 4 km summit caldera, but the island has largely escaped broad destruction. Eruptions on April 17, 2005 and May 29, 2006 ended a period of quiet.

== Volcanic activity ==
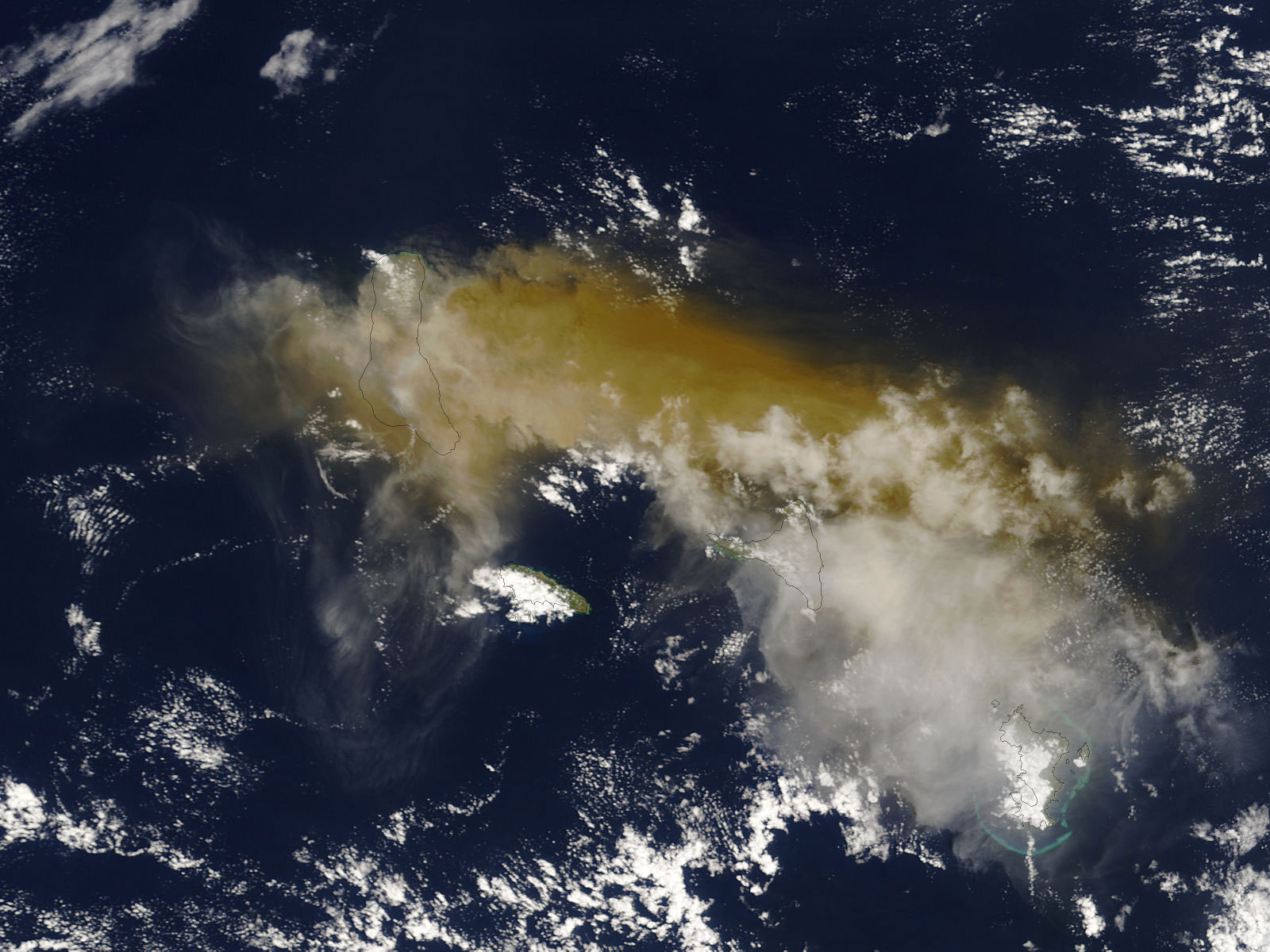
Satellite image of the volcano after its November 2005 eruption, with ash obscuring the archipelago

=== April 2005 eruption ===
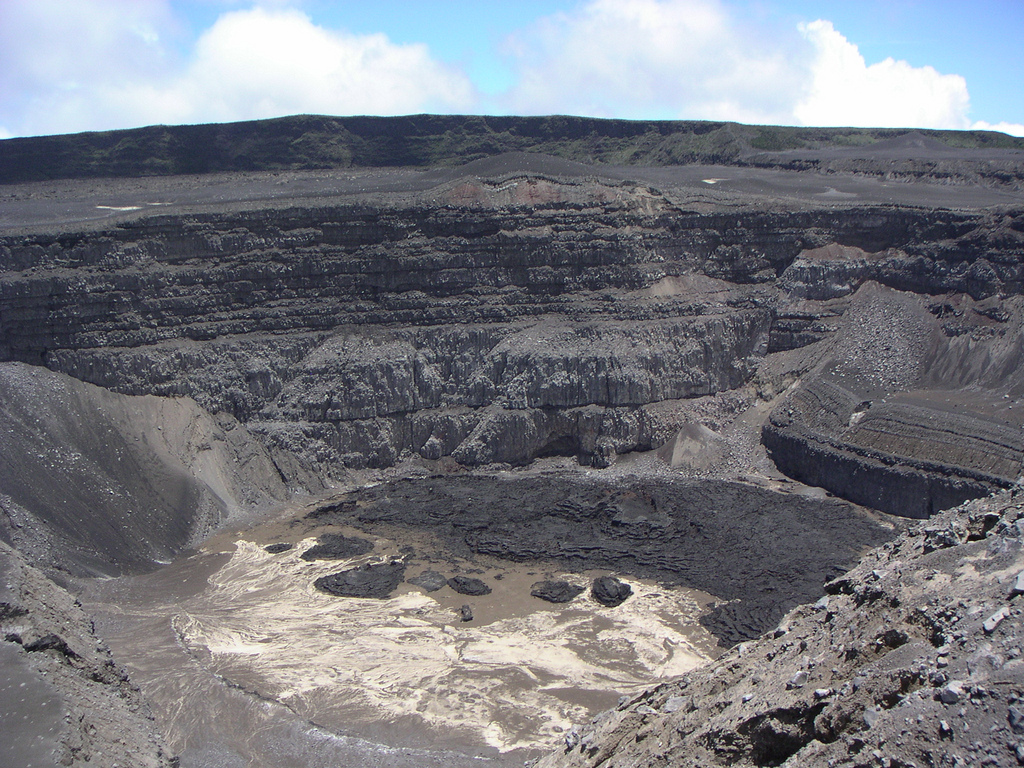
Karthala volcano crater in November 2006.

The eruption, which carried a risk of lava flows and deadly volcanic gas, caused the evacuation of 2,000 residents, which led to the death of an infant. The crater was clearly changed by the eruption. A grey field of ash surrounds the crater and the caldera itself seems larger and deeper. The crater lake, which formed after Karthala's last eruption in 1991 and once dominated the caldera, is now gone completely. In its place were rough, dark grey rocks, possibly cooling lava or rubble from the collapsed crater.

=== May 2006 activity ===
On May 29, Reuters reported that residents of Moroni could see lava spewing at the top of the volcano. Within a few days the volcanic activity subsided.

== Flora and fauna ==
The mountain is covered by intact moist evergreen forest from 1200 metres to about 1800 metres above sea-level. Higher up the vegetation consists of stunted trees and heathland where the giant heather Erica comorensis grows. The mountain's forest is threatened by logging and the spread of agriculture. Many of the species found on the mountain are unique to the Comoros and four bird species are found only on the slopes of Mount Karthala: Grand Comoro drongo, Humblot's flycatcher, Karthala scops owl, and Karthala white-eye.

=== Important Bird Area ===
A 14,228 ha (35,160-acre) tract encompassing the upper slopes and summit of the mountain has been designated an Important Bird Area (IBA) by BirdLife International, because it supports populations of Comoros blue pigeons, Comoros fodies, Comoros olive pigeons, Comoros thrushes, Grand Comoro brush warblers, Grand Comoro bulbuls, Grand Comoro drongos, Humblot's flycatchers, Humblot's sunbirds, Karthala scops owls, Karthala white-eyes, and Malagasy harriers.

== Karthala National Park ==
Karthala National Park
- Parc National du Karthala
- Interactive map of Karthala National Park
- Coordinates: 11°46′S 43°21′E
- Area: 26,214 ha (101.21 sq mi)
- Designation: National park
- Designated: 2010
- Administrator: Comoros National Parks Authority

Ramsar Wetland
- Designated: 12 November 2006
- Reference no.: 1649

Karthala National Park protects an area of 262.14 km^{2} on the mountain. It was designated in 2010.

== See also ==
- List of Ultras of Africa
