= Humblotia =

The name Humblotia can refer to two different genera of organisms:

- The bird genus Humblotia, containing a single species - Humblot's flycatcher (Humblotia flavirostris).
- The plant genus Humblotia, a synonym for Drypetes.
