= Léon Humblot =

French naturalist (1852–1914)

Léon Joseph Henry Humblot (French pronunciation: [leɔ̃ ʒozɛf ɑ̃ʁi ɛ̃blo]; 3 June 1852 in Nancy – 20 March 1914) was a French naturalist and botanical collector.

He worked as a gardener for the Muséum national d'histoire naturelle in Paris, then in 1878 embarked on a research trip to Madagascar, where he set up an experimental garden and collected orchid species. In 1884, he entered the Comoros Islands as part of a geographical survey conducted by the natural history museum. In 1885, he procured the signature of a treaty with the Sultan of Bambao, thus establishing a basis for a "Grande Comore protectorate". During the following year, the French had overall rule of the Comoros (Grande Comore, Anjouan, Mayotte and Moheli islands).

On the island of Grande Comore, Humblot founded a colonial company that oversaw the operations of several farms, plantations and processing factories for spices and perfumes. From 1889 to 1896, he held the title of Résident, being forced to relinquish the status in 1896 due to charges of corruption by the French government.

While stationed in the Comoros, he collected botanical specimens that were sent to naturalist Alfred Grandidier (1836–1921). The herbarium of the Muséum national d'histoire naturelle in Paris also received numerous items from Humblot (including 1300 vascular plant specimens). During his career, Humblot also collected ornithological and entomological specimens.

The botanical genera Humblotia, Humblotiella and Humblotiodendron commemorate his name. In addition, Humblot's heron, Humblot's flycatcher, and Humblot's sunbird are named after him.

== Publications associated with Léon Humblot ==
- "66 phot. des Comores, de Nossi-Bé et de Madagascar, avec des portraits de Said Ali, sultan de la Grande Comore, et de ses ministres, de son frére Mohammed Ali, d'un autre frére, Mohammed Sidi, du général en chef, du premier ministre, de la femme légitime, de princesses de la Grande Comore, de Léon Humblot, résident français dans cette île, du prince Said Omar de Mayotte. Phot. par Léon Humblot, don Alphonse Milne-Edwards en 1885", (with Alphonse Milne-Edwards) – 66 photographs, the Comoros, Nossi-Bé and Madagascar, etc.
- "La vie et les activités de Léon Humblot à la Grande Comores, 1884–1915" (2010); author Nasfati Mze Ahamada; Sudel Fuma; Université de la Réunion. Faculté des Lettres et des Sciences Humaines.
