= Moheli bulbul =

Conservation status
- Near Threatened (IUCN 3.1)

Scientific classification
- Kingdom: Animalia
- Phylum: Chordata
- Class: Aves
- Order: Passeriformes
- Family: Pycnonotidae
- Genus: Hypsipetes
- Species: H. moheliensis

Binomial name
- Hypsipetes moheliensis (Benson, 1960)

Synonyms
- Hypsipetes crassirostris moheliensis; Hypsipetes parvirostris moheliensis

Species of bird

The Moheli bulbul (Hypsipetes moheliensis) is a species of songbird in the bulbul family, Pycnonotidae. It is endemic to the Indian Ocean island of Mohéli. Its natural habitat is subtropical or tropical moist montane forests. Until 2011, it was classified as a subspecies of the Grand Comoro bulbul. It is also considered a sister species to the Seychelles bulbul.
