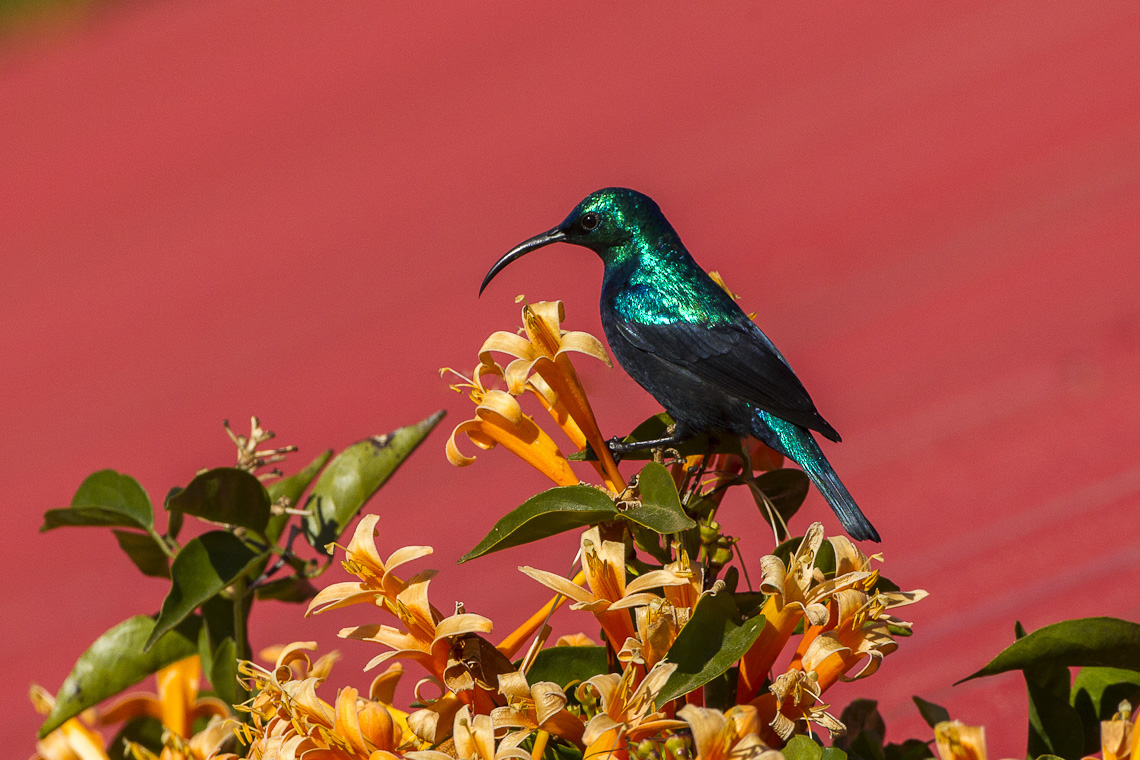

Conservation status
- Least Concern (IUCN 3.1)

Scientific classification
- Kingdom: Animalia
- Phylum: Chordata
- Class: Aves
- Order: Passeriformes
- Family: Nectariniidae
- Genus: Cinnyris
- Species: C. notatus

Binomial name
- Cinnyris notatus (Müller, 1776)

Subspecies
- C. n. moebii; C. n. notatus; C. n. voeltzkowi

Synonyms
- Nectarinia notata

= Malagasy green sunbird =

Species of bird

The Malagasy green sunbird (Cinnyris notatus), also known as the long-billed green sunbird, is a species of bird in the family Nectariniidae. It has been placed in the genus Nectarinia. It is found in the Comoros and Madagascar. Its natural habitats are subtropical or tropical dry forest, subtropical or tropical moist lowland forest, subtropical or tropical mangrove forest, and subtropical or tropical moist montane forest.

== Taxonomy ==
The taxon moebii, by most authorities considered a subspecies of the Long-billed Green Sunbird, has occasionally been considered a separate species, the Comoro green sunbird (Cinnyris moebii).
