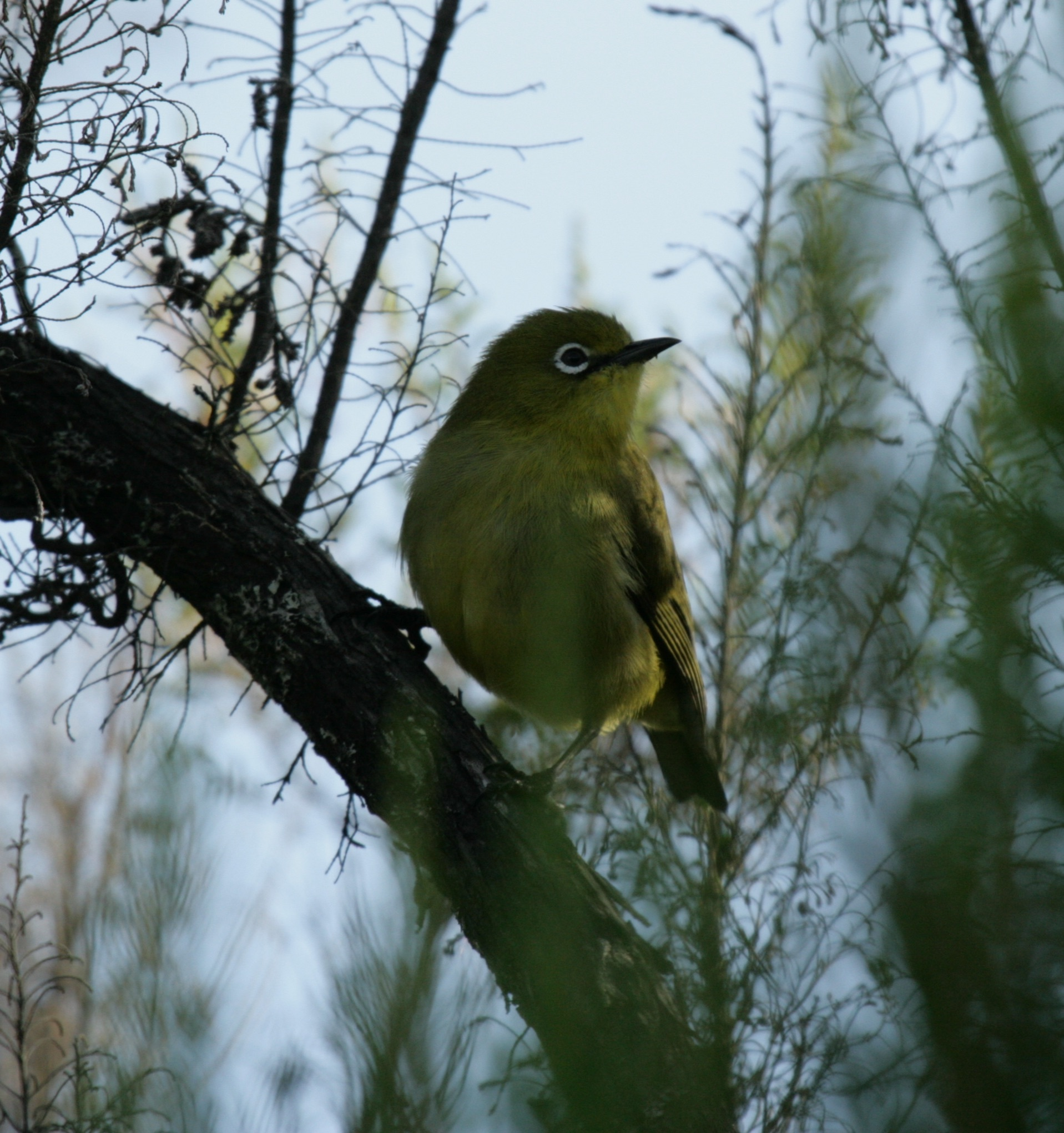

Conservation status
- Near Threatened (IUCN 3.1)

Scientific classification
- Kingdom: Animalia
- Phylum: Chordata
- Class: Aves
- Order: Passeriformes
- Family: Zosteropidae
- Genus: Zosterops
- Species: Z. mouroniensis

Binomial name
- Zosterops mouroniensis Milne-Edwards & Oustalet, 1885

= Karthala white-eye =

Species of bird

The Karthala white-eye (Zosterops mouroniensis), also known as the Mount Karthala white-eye, Grand Comore white-eye, or Comoro white-eye, is a species of bird in the family Zosteropidae. As suggested by its name, it is endemic to Philippia heath woodland growing on Mount Karthala on the island of Grand Comore in the Comoros. Mount Karthala is an active volcano and future eruptions pose a serious threat to the Karthala white-eye. The bird is further threatened by human-induced habitat loss.

The bird is approximately 13 centimetres (5.1 in) long with olive upperparts and yellow-green underparts. It has a white ring around the eye. Its diet consists of fruits and insects.
