= Karthala scops owl =

Conservation status
- Endangered (IUCN 3.1)
- CITES Appendix II

Scientific classification
- Kingdom: Animalia
- Phylum: Chordata
- Class: Aves
- Order: Strigiformes
- Family: Strigidae
- Genus: Otus
- Species: O. pauliani

Binomial name
- Otus pauliani Benson, 1960

Species of owl

The Karthala scops owl (Otus pauliani), also known as the Grand Comore scops owl or Comoro scops owl, is a small scops owl endemic to the island of Grande Comore in the Comoro Islands.

== Taxonomy ==
The Karthala scops owl was formerly considered to be a subspecies of the Madagascar scops owl (Otus rutilus), but with the other Comoro Islands scops owls, it is now regarded as a separate species.

== Description ==
The Karthala scops owl lacks ear-tufts and comes in two colour forms, a light morph and a dark morph. The light morph is dark greyish-brown on the upperparts with fine barring and pale spots along the scapulars. The underparts are reddish-buff with a dense pattern of fine barring on the flight feathers and tail. The dark morph is overall dark chocolate brown but no specimen of a dark morph individual has been taken. It measures approximately 20 cm (7.9 in) in length and the wingspan is 45 cm (18 in).

=== Voice ===
Its call is a whistled "toot", which is given repeatedly with one second intervals.

== Distribution and habitat ==
Endemic to the island of Grande Comore, the Karthala scops owl is found only on Mount Karthala, an active volcano. Here it inhabits the montane forest, some secondary growth and the tree-heath above the forest.

== Behaviour ==
Nocturnal and very territorial, the Karthala scops owl will approach an imitation of its call, otherwise almost unknown. It has relatively weak talons so probably feeds on insects and other invertebrates. It is thought to nest in tree cavities.

== Status and population ==
It has an estimated population of 2,000. It is classified as endangered due to it being restricted to such a small area, which is being rapidly deforested.
