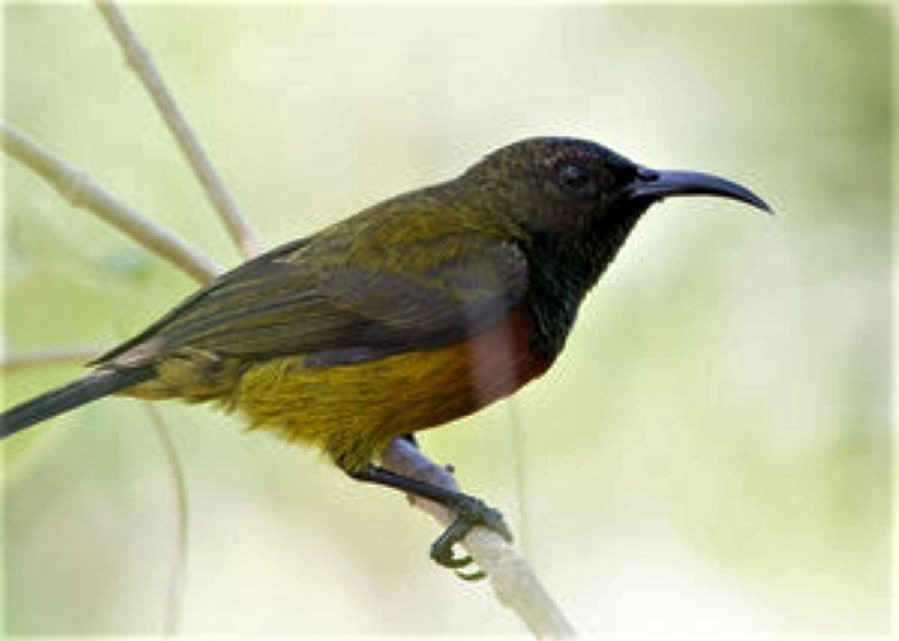
- Galawa Beach Hotel, Comoros

Conservation status
- Least Concern (IUCN 3.1)

Scientific classification
- Kingdom: Animalia
- Phylum: Chordata
- Class: Aves
- Order: Passeriformes
- Family: Nectariniidae
- Genus: Cinnyris
- Species: C. humbloti

Binomial name
- Cinnyris humbloti Milne-Edwards, A & Oustalet, 1885

Synonyms
- Nectarinia humbloti

= Humblot's sunbird =

Species of bird

Humblot's sunbird (Cinnyris humbloti) is a species of bird in the family Nectariniidae. It is endemic to the islands of Grand Comoro and Mohéli in the Comoros.

== Description ==
The adult male Humblot's sunbird has green upperparts with a dark or gold gloss. In the nominate subspecies the throat and upper breast are glossy green with a red lower breast, in the subspecies from Mohéli the upperparts are duller and the throat and upper breast are glossed with purple. It has yellow pectoral tufts and the lower breast and belly are yellowish green. The adult female is olive green above, greyer on the head with a brighter rump and greyer underparts with dark spots and streaks, has a white tip to the tail and pectoral tufts. They are 11 centimetres (4.3 in) in length and the male weights 5.5–7 grams (0.19–0.25 oz), the female 5.5–8 grams (0.19–0.28 oz).

=== Voice ===
The song of Humblot's sunbird consists of a series of chipping notes, which are mixed up. Alarm and contact calls are a harsh scolding "tssk, tssk".

== Distribution and habitat ==
Humblot's sunbird is endemic to Grand Comoro and Moheli in the Comoros. It is found in forest, gardens and scrub from sea level to 790 metres (2,590 ft) above sea level.

== Habits ==
Humblot's sunbird feeds by gleaning and hover gleaning insects from the leaf tips of the fronds of the coconut palm. It is known to sip nectar from Cocos nucifera, Cussonia spp, Eucalyptus and Impatiens spp. The nest is made of fine grass, covered with moss and lined with milkweed strands and attached to with moss to a branch. Laying is in August and September.

== Subspecies ==
There are two subspecies:

- Cinnyris humbloti humbloti A. Milne-Edwards & Oustalet, 1885: Grand Comoro, in Comoro Is.
- Cinnyris humbloti mohelicus Stresemann & Grote, 1926: Mohéli

== Etymology ==
The scientific name commemorates the French naturalist Léon Humblot.
