= Comoro thrush =

Conservation status
- Near Threatened (IUCN 3.1)

Scientific classification
- Kingdom: Animalia
- Phylum: Chordata
- Class: Aves
- Order: Passeriformes
- Family: Turdidae
- Genus: Turdus
- Species: T. bewsheri

Binomial name
- Turdus bewsheri Newton, E, 1877

Species of bird

The Comoro thrush (Turdus bewsheri) is a species of bird in the family Turdidae. It is found in the Comoros Islands in the south western Indian Ocean.

== Description ==
The Comoro thrush is a brown bird with olive tinged upperparts, slightly more rufous on the tail and wings. The underparts are whitish except for brown flanks and brown scaling on the breast and belly, central belly and undertail coverts are white. The females are browner than the males but otherwise similar, juveniles are more rufous. The length is 24 centimetres (9.4 in).

=== Voice ===
The song is a typically thrush-like series of melodious, rich notes which varies between islands. Alarm call is a sharp "twit" and there is a soft contact call.

== Distribution and subspecies ==
There are three recognised subspecies, each endemic to a single island. They are:

- Turdis bewsheri comorensis Milne-Edwards & Oustalet, 1885: Grand Comoro.
- Turdis bewsheri moheliensis Benson, 1960: Mohéli.
- Turdis bewsheri bewsheri E. Newton, 1877: Anjouan.

== Habitat ==
Comoro thrush occurs in evergreen primary forest and forest edge from sea level to 700 metres (2,300 ft), except for the subspecies T.B. comorensis which occurs on Mount Karthala above this altitude as no forests exist lower than this.

== Habits ==
The Comoro thrush normally forages low down in the understorey or on the ground, looking fore spiders, grasshoppers, bugs, molluscs and some fruit and seeds. Will go higher into the canopy to feed on fruit. Sometimes joins mixed species flocks. It breeds in mid-August to October when a cup shaped nest is built from plant fibres and roots, covered in moss and lined with fine grasses. It is placed up to 3 metres (9.8 ft) from the ground on a tree stump, among epiphytes or along a horizontal branch. the normal clutch is 2 eggs.

== Conservation ==
The Comoro thrush is classified as Near threatened by the IUCN and the main threat is habitat loss through forest degradation due to clearance by subsistence farmers and firewood cutting.
