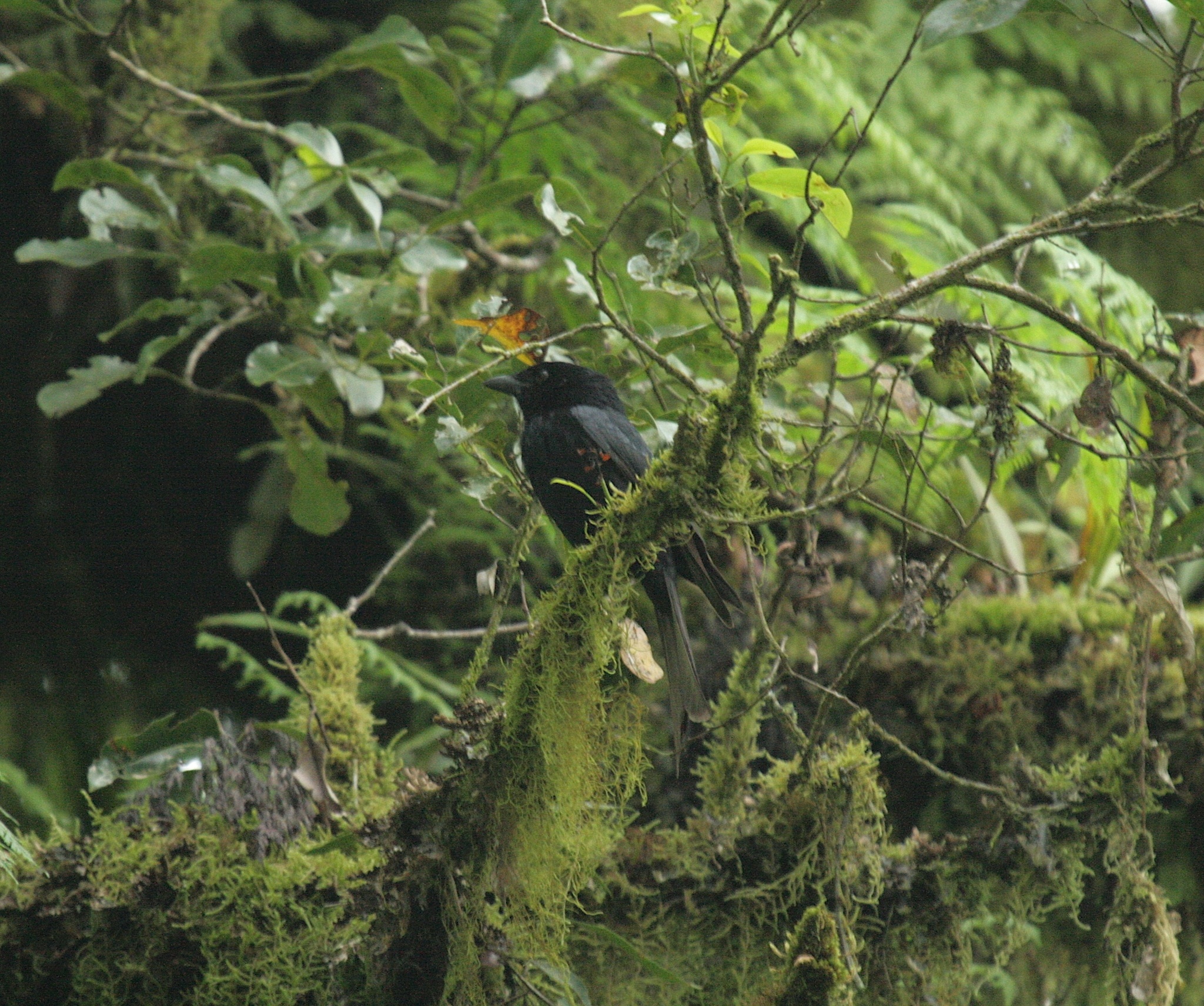

Conservation status
- Vulnerable (IUCN 3.1)

Scientific classification
- Kingdom: Animalia
- Phylum: Chordata
- Class: Aves
- Order: Passeriformes
- Family: Dicruridae
- Genus: Dicrurus
- Species: D. fuscipennis

Binomial name
- Dicrurus fuscipennis (Milne-Edwards & Oustalet, 1887)

= Grand Comore drongo =

Species of bird

The Grand Comore drongo (Dicrurus fuscipennis) is a species of bird in the family Dicruridae. It is endemic to Comoros.

The bird is glossy black with some matte brown contrasts and a forked tail. It is approximately 24 centimetres (9.4 in) long and has a black bill and legs. It feeds on fruit and large insects such as cockroaches, grasshoppers, beetles and mantes.

Its natural habitats are subtropical or tropical moist lowland forests, pastureland, and plantations. It is threatened by habitat loss.
