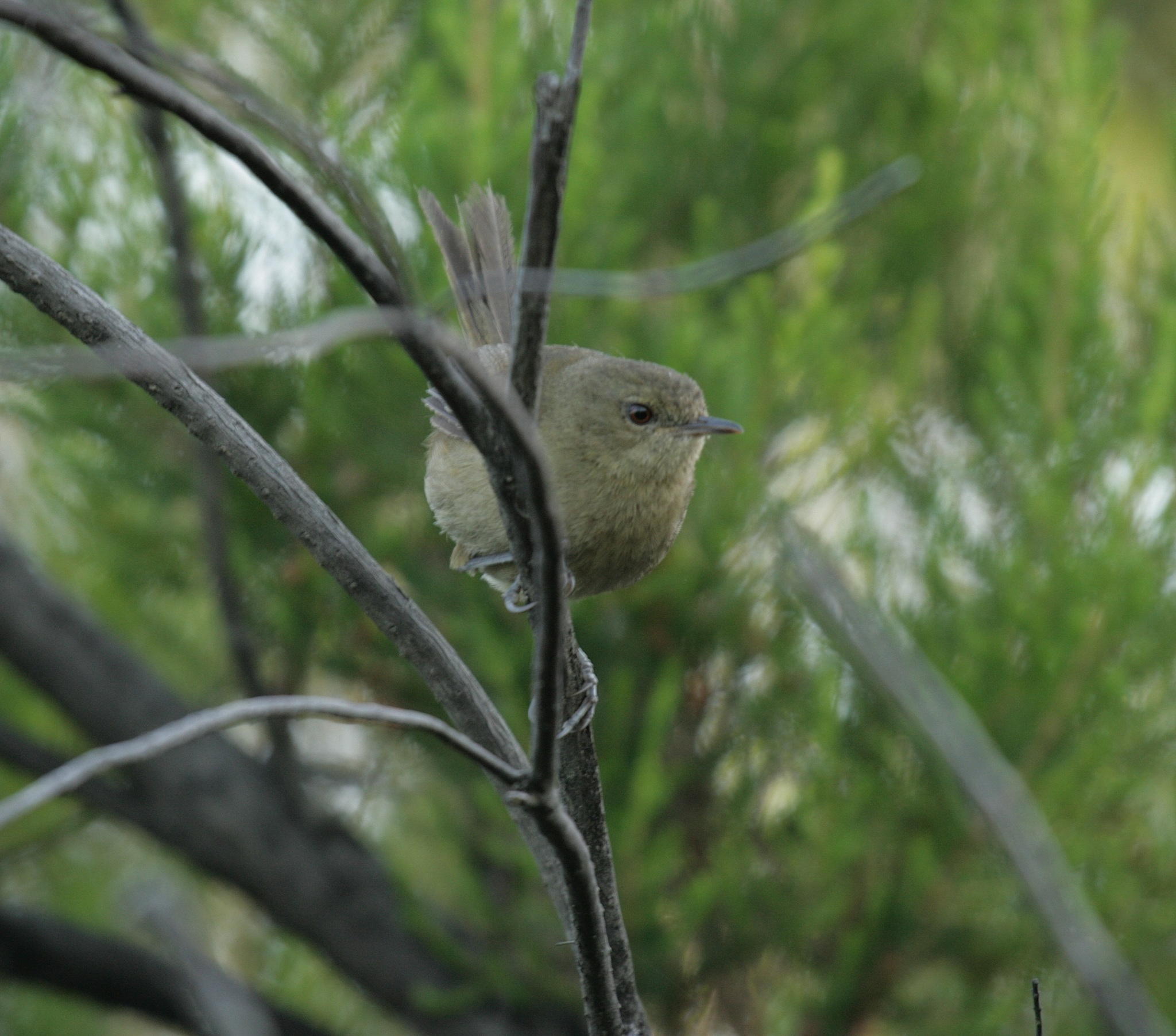

Conservation status
- Least Concern (IUCN 3.1)

Scientific classification
- Kingdom: Animalia
- Phylum: Chordata
- Class: Aves
- Order: Passeriformes
- Family: Acrocephalidae
- Genus: Nesillas
- Species: N. brevicaudata

Binomial name
- Nesillas brevicaudata (Milne-Edwards & Oustalet, 1888)
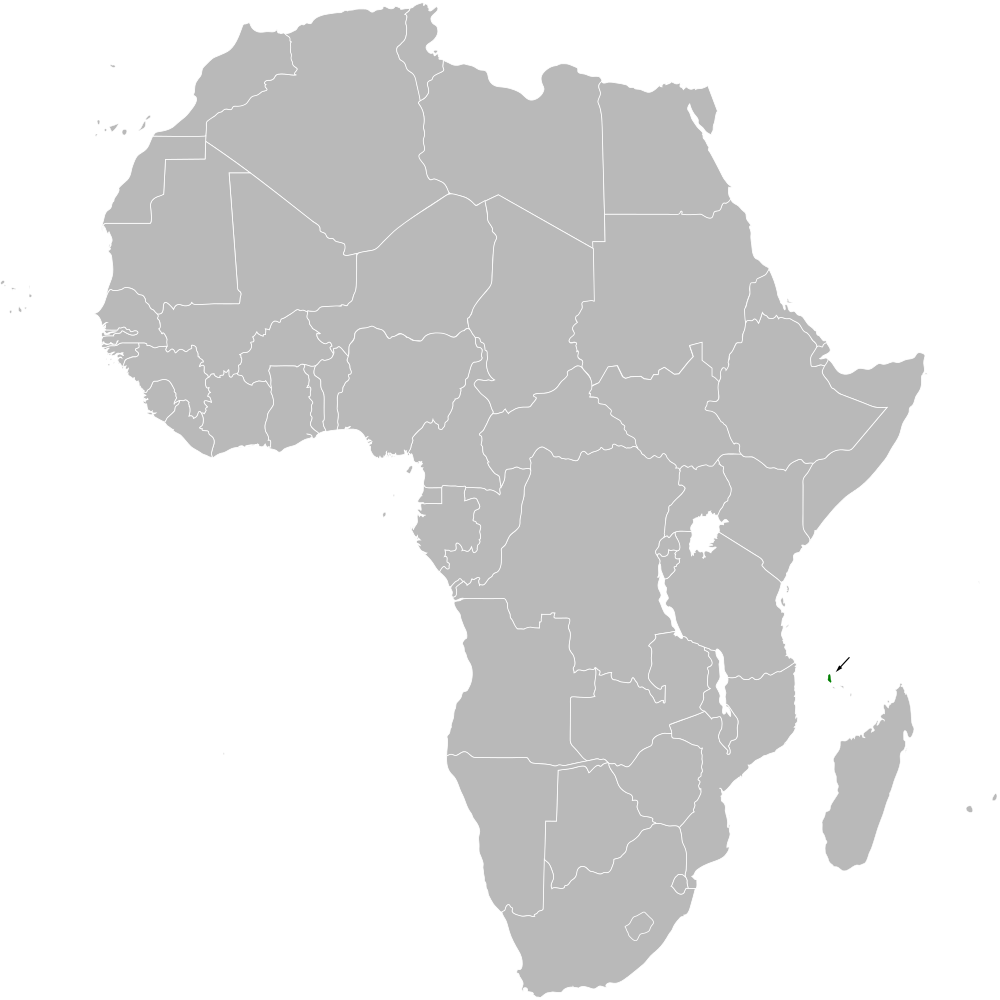
- Resident range (arrowed)

= Grande Comore brush warbler =

Species of bird

The Grande Comore brush warbler (Nesillas brevicaudata) is a species of Old World warbler in the family Acrocephalidae. It is endemic to Comoros. Its natural habitat is subtropical or tropical moist montane forests.
