= Grande Comore bulbul =

Conservation status
- Near Threatened (IUCN 3.1)

Scientific classification
- Kingdom: Animalia
- Phylum: Chordata
- Class: Aves
- Order: Passeriformes
- Family: Pycnonotidae
- Genus: Hypsipetes
- Species: H. parvirostris

Binomial name
- Hypsipetes parvirostris Milne-Edwards & Oustalet, 1885

Species of songbird

The Grande Comore bulbul (Hypsipetes parvirostris) is a species of songbird in the bulbul family, Pycnonotidae. It is found on the Comoro Islands. Its natural habitat is subtropical or tropical moist montane forests. Until 2011, the Moheli bulbul was considered as a subspecies of the Grand Comoro bulbul. Alternative names for the Grande Comore bulbul include the Comoro bulbul and Grand Comoro black bulbul.
