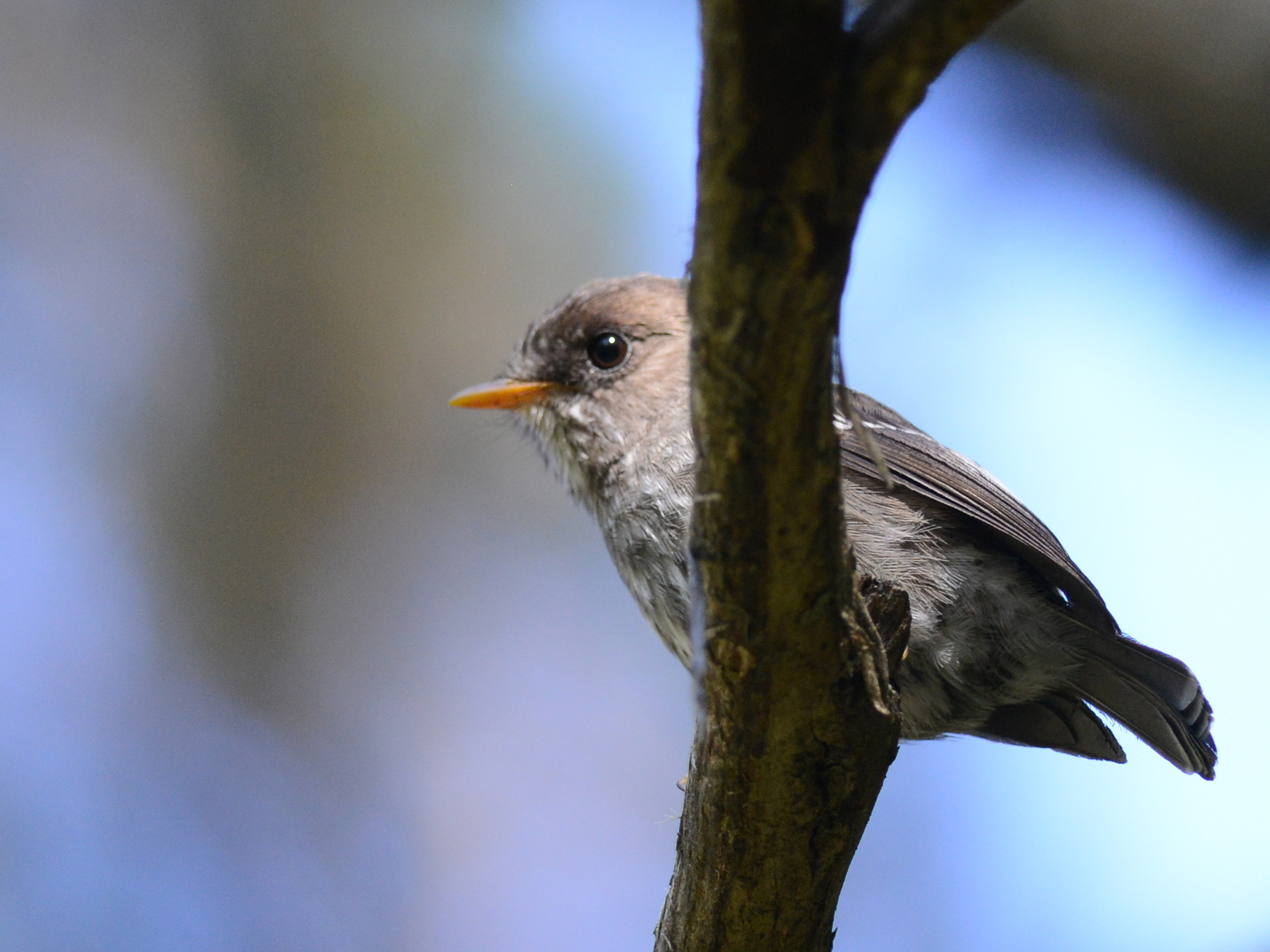

Conservation status
- Vulnerable (IUCN 3.1)

Scientific classification
- Kingdom: Animalia
- Phylum: Chordata
- Class: Aves
- Order: Passeriformes
- Family: Muscicapidae
- Genus: Muscicapa
- Species: M. flavirostris

Binomial name
- Muscicapa flavirostris (Milne-Edwards & Oustalet, 1885)

= Humblot's flycatcher =

Species of bird

Humblot's flycatcher (Muscicapa flavirostris) or the Grand Comore flycatcher, is a small passerine bird belonging to the Old World flycatcher family. Humblot's flycatcher is endemic to the island of Grand Comoro in the Comoros where it inhabits forest on the slopes of Mount Karthala. The scientific name commemorates the French naturalist Léon Humblot.

== Description ==
The upperparts are grey-brown while the underparts are pale with dark streaks. It has a dark crown with pale streaks and the bill and feet are yellow-orange. The bird is 14 centimetres (5.5 in) long. It is often silent but has a soft trilling call. It differs from Muscicapa and other flycatchers in having plumage with a very soft and fluffy texture, and by having distinctive feathers on the crown that are a modification that represents the beginnings of the formation of a crest.

== Ecology ==
Humblot's flycatcher feeds on insects which it catches by making short flights from a perch low in a tree or bush. Often, it will feed in groups of two or three. Little is known about its breeding habits; the only known nest was a cup built high in a tree which contained at least two young.

== Status ==
Humblot's flycatcher has a very restricted range and is threatened because of destruction and degradation of the forest and the spread of introduced species such as the strawberry guava (Psidium cattleyanum), which could overwhelm native species, the common myna (Acridotheres tristis) and rats which may raid the nests. The population of 10,000-19,000 individuals is decreasing and the species is classed by the International Union for Conservation of Nature as vulnerable.
