= Endemic birds of Madagascar and western Indian Ocean islands =

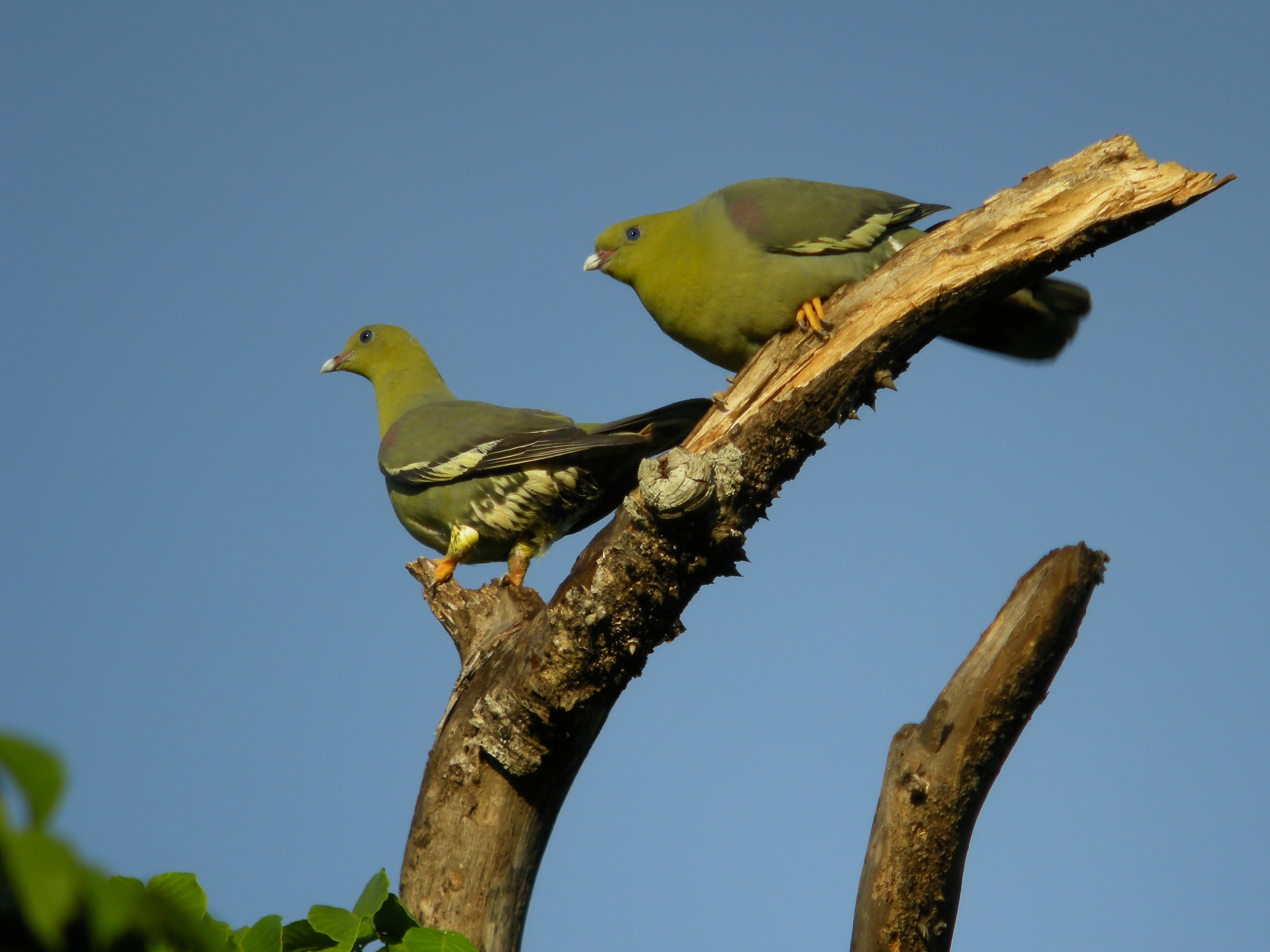
Madagascar green pigeon

This article is one of a series providing information about endemism among birds in the world's various zoogeographic zones. For an overview of this subject see Endemism in birds.

== Patterns of endemism ==
This region is notable not just for the high number of endemic species, but for endemism in higher-level taxonomic groupings too.

=== Order-level endemism ===
Two orders are endemic to Madagascar or the wider region:

- Mesites are placed within the Mesitornithiformes, an order containing three species in two genera.
- The cuckoo-roller is placed in the monotypic order Leptosomiformes. It is endemic to the wider region, as its single species is present on both Madagascar and Comores.

=== Family-level endemism ===
The following three families are endemic to Madagascar:

- Ground-rollers, a family within the Coraciiformes, containing five species in three genera.
- Asities, a passerine family within the Old World suboscines, containing four species in two genera
- Malagasy Warblers, a passerine family within the Old World oscines, containing eleven species in eight genera.

=== Subfamily-level endemism ===
- The nine species of coua (genus Coua, a subfamily of the cuckoos) are all Madagascan endemics.
- Two extinct species, the dodo of Mauritius and Rodrigues solitaire of Rodrigues are placed in the Raphinae (a subfamily of the doves and pigeons).
- the rock-thrushes, Monticola, in which three of the 13 species are endemic to Madagascar (these three are sometimes separated into their own genus, Pseudocossyphus).

== Endemic Bird Areas ==
In Madagascar, the total wealth of known terrestrial is about 5,800 species (and 2,500 pending description), and 86 percent are endemic to the island.

== List of species ==
=== Species endemic to Madagascar ===
The following is a list of species endemic to Madagascar.

Non-passerines

- Bernier's teal
- Meller's duck
- Madagascar pochard
- Madagascar partridge *
- Alaotra grebe
- Madagascar grebe
- Madagascar pond heron
- Humblot's heron
- Madagascar crested ibis
- Madagascar fish eagle
- Madagascar serpent eagle
- Henst's goshawk
- Madagascar harrier-hawk
- Madagascar buzzard
- Madagascar cuckoo-hawk
- Madagascar sparrowhawk
- Frances's sparrowhawk
- Banded kestrel
- Malagasy kestrel
- Brown mesite
- White-breasted mesite
- Subdesert mesite
- Madagascar buttonquail *
- Slender-billed flufftail
- Madagascar flufftail
- Madagascar wood rail
- White-throated rail
- Madagascar rail
- Sakalava rail
- Madagascar snipe
- Elephant Bird
- Madagascar jacana
- Madagascar plover
- Madagascar sandgrouse
- Madagascar blue pigeon
- Madagascar green pigeon
- Madagascar turtle dove *
- Grey-headed lovebird *
- Red-capped coua
- Running coua
- Giant coua
- Coquerel's coua
- Red-breasted coua
- Red-fronted coua
- Blue coua
- Crested coua
- Verreaux's coua
- Madagascar owl
- Red owl
- White-browed owl
- Madagascar scops owl
- Collared nightjar
- Madagascar pygmy kingfisher
- Scaly ground roller
- Short-legged ground roller
- Pitta-like ground roller
- Rufous-headed ground roller
- Long-tailed ground roller

Passerines

- Velvet asity
- Schlegel's asity
- Common sunbird-asity
- Yellow-bellied sunbird-asity
- Appert's greenbul
- Grey-crowned greenbul
- Dusky greenbul
- Long-billed greenbul
- Spectacled greenbul
- Yellow-browed oxylabes
- White-throated oxylabes
- Crossley's babbler
- Madagascar magpie-robin
- Amber Mountain rock thrush
- Forest rock-thrush
- Littoral rock-thrush
- Madagascar wagtail
- Ward's flycatcher
- Common newtonia
- Dark newtonia
- Archbold's newtonia
- Red-tailed newtonia
- Madagascar lark
- Madagascar swamp warbler
- Thamnornis warbler
- Subdesert brush warbler
- Grey emutail
- Brown emutail
- Common jery
- Stripe-throated jery
- Green jery
- Wedge-tailed jery
- Rand's warbler
- Cryptic warbler
- Nuthatch vanga
- White-headed vanga
- Chabert's vanga
- Blue vanga
- Helmet vanga
- Sickle-billed vanga
- Rufous vanga
- Bernier's vanga
- Red-shouldered vanga
- Red-tailed vanga
- Lafresnaye's vanga
- Hook-billed vanga
- Pollen's vanga
- Van Dam's vanga
- Tylas vanga
- Ashy cuckooshrike
- Madagascar starling
- Forest fody
- Madagascar fody *
- Sakalava weaver
- Nelicourvi weaver
- Madagascar munia

Note that:

- Madagascar partridge is endemic as a native species to Madagascar, but has been introduced on the Mascarenes
- Madagascar buttonquail is endemic as a native species to Madagascar, but has been introduced on the Mascarenes
- Madagascar turtle dove is endemic as a native species to Madagascar, but is thought to be an introduced species on the other islands in the region
- Grey-headed lovebird is endemic as a native species to Madagascar, but has been introduced to the Comoro Islands
- Madagascar fody is endemic as a native species to Madagascar, but has been introduced to many of the other islands in the region
- The Elephant bird is now extinct.

=== Species endemic to other islands or island groups in the region ===
The following is a list of species endemic to other islands.

==== Species endemic to the Mascarene group ====
- Mauritius kestrel
- Pink pigeon
- Mauritius parakeet
- Mascarene swiftlet
- Réunion bulbul
- Mauritius bulbul
- Réunion stonechat
- Mascarene paradise flycatcher
- Rodrigues warbler
- Mauritius olive white-eye
- Réunion olive white-eye
- Mauritius grey white-eye
- Réunion grey white-eye
- Mauritius cuckoo-shrike
- Réunion cuckoo-shrike
- Mauritius fody
- Rodrigues fody

==== Species endemic to the Comoros ====
- Comoro olive pigeon
- Comoro green pigeon
- Karthala scops-owl
- Anjouan scops-owl
- Anjouan cuckoo-roller
- Comoro bulbul
- Comoro thrush
- Humblot's flycatcher
- Comoro brush-warbler
- Benson's brush-warbler
- Kirk's white-eye
- Karthala white-eye
- Mayotte white-eye
- Comoro green sunbird
- Humblot's sunbird
- Anjouan sunbird
- Mayotte sunbird
- Comoro blue vanga
- Comoro cuckoo-shrike
- Mayotte drongo
- Grande Comore drongo
- Comoro fody

==== Species endemic to central Seychelles ====
- Seychelles kestrel
- Seychelles blue pigeon
- Seychelles black parrot
- Seychelles scops-owl
- Seychelles swiftlet
- Seychelles magpie-robin
- Seychelles black paradise flycatcher
- Seychelles warbler
- Seychelles white-eye
- Seychelles sunbird
- Seychelles fody

==== Species endemic to the Aldabra islands ====
- Aldabra rail
- Aldabra brush-warbler
- Abbott's sunbird
- Aldabra drongo
- Aldabra fody

There are native Madagascar turtle doves in the Aldabra group (separate races from those found on Madagascar); they may represent a separate species.

=== Other species endemic to the region ===
The following is a list of species which are not endemic to a specific island (or island group) but are endemic to the region as a whole.

- Malagasy sacred ibis (Aldabra, western coast of Madagascar)
- Réunion harrier (Madagascar, Comoros, Mascarenes)
- Frances's sparrowhawk (Madagascar, Comoros)
- Malagasy kestrel (Madagascar, Aldabra)
- Comoro blue pigeon (Comoros, Aldabra)
- Greater vasa parrot (Madagascar, Comoros)
- Lesser vasa parrot (Madagascar, Comoros)
- Malagasy coucal (Madagascar, Aldabra)
- Madagascar scops owl (Madagascar, Comoros)
- Madagascar nightjar (Madagascar, Aldabra)
- Madagascar black swift (Madagascar, Comoros)
- Madagascar spine-tailed swift (Madagascar, Comoros)
- Madagascar kingfisher (Madagascar, Comoros)
- Madagascar bee-eater (Madagascar, Comoros)
- Madagascar cuckoo-roller (Madagascar, Comoros)
- Mascarene martin (Madagascar, Mascarenes)
- Malagasy bulbul (Madagascar, Comoros, Aldabra)
- Malagasy paradise flycatcher (Madagascar, Comoros)
- Madagascar cisticola (Madagascar, Aldabra group)
- Malagasy brush-warbler (Madagascar, Mohéli, Anjouan)
- Malagasy white-eye (Madagascar, various other islands)
- Madagascar green sunbird (Madagascar, Mohéli)
- Souimanga sunbird (Aldabra, Madagascar)
- Crested drongo (Madagascar, Anjouan)

=== Near-endemics ===
The following is a list of species endemic to the region as breeding species:

- Madagascar squacco heron (breeding endemic on Madagascar & Aldabra, migrates to East Africa)
- Madagascar lesser cuckoo (endemic to Madagascar in the breeding season, winters in East Africa).

Two Western Palearctic falcons winter entirely (Eleonora's falcon) or mainly (sooty falcon) on Madagascar.
