= Zahamena National Park =

National park of eastern Madagascar

- IUCN category II (national park)
- Location within Madagascar
- Nearest city: Antanandava, Ambatondrazaka
- Coordinates: 17°46′44″S 48°45′36″E
- Area: 423 km^{2} (163 sq mi)
- Established: 1997
- Governing body: Madagascar National Parks Association

UNESCO World Heritage Site
- Type: Natural
- Criteria: ix, x
- Designated: 2007
- Reference no.: 1257
- Region: List of World Heritage Sites in Africa

Zahamena National Park is a national park of Madagascar. Established in 1997, it covers an area of 423 square kilometres (163.32 sq mi) out of a total protected area of 643 square kilometres (248.26 sq mi). It is part of a UNESCO World Heritage Site, Rainforests of the Atsinanana, inscribed in 2007 and consisting of 13 specific areas located within eight national parks in the eastern part of Madagascar. In 2001, Bird Life International assessed avifauna of 112 species of which 67 species are exclusively endemic to Madagascar.

The park is habitat for 112 bird species, 46 reptile species, 62 species of amphibians and 48 species of mammals, including 13 species of lemurs. The ethnic groups inhabiting the area are mostly Betsimisaraka and Sihanak. The most prominent faunal species in the park are: Indri indri (babakoto), a black lemur with white patches; the Madagascar red owl (Tyto soumagnei), locally known as vorondolomena; the katsatsaka (Paroedura masobe), a small gecko; the Madagascar serpent eagle (Eutriorchis astur), a threatened species; and the red-tailed newtonia (Newtonia fanovanae), a very common bird species in the park. The two most prominent endemic floral species are Marattia boivinii (kobila) and Blotella coursii (fanjana malemy).

== Geography ==
The park, in the eastern part of the Madagascar island, is 40 kilometres (25 mi) north-east of Ambatondrazaka, 4 kilometres (2.5 mi) from Manakambahiny-East, 70 kilometres (43 mi) to the northwest of Tamatave and about 25 kilometres (16 mi) east from Lake Alaotra. It is considered to be difficult to reach, so doesn't attract many tourists. It is part of the rainforest topography and ecology of the Rainforests of the Atsinanana. It is located in rugged, undulating topography of the eastern rock faces as part of the mountainous hinterland of Madagascar with an elevation range of 254–1,560 metres (833–5,118 ft). This terrain forms the dividing line of the lowlands. The land area of the park has well defined boundaries on the north east and south. The park is divided into two zones (on the east and west) by a corridor with settled villages in between. The park area is made up of many valleys and is drained by rivers such as the Sahatavy River and the Sarondrina River. On the north-west side of the park there are many more rivers which drain into Lake Alaotra. The office of the park administration is situated at Antanandava. Climatically, the park receives an annual rainfall in the range of 180–200 cm; the average temperature recorded is in the range of 15-28C.

== Flora ==
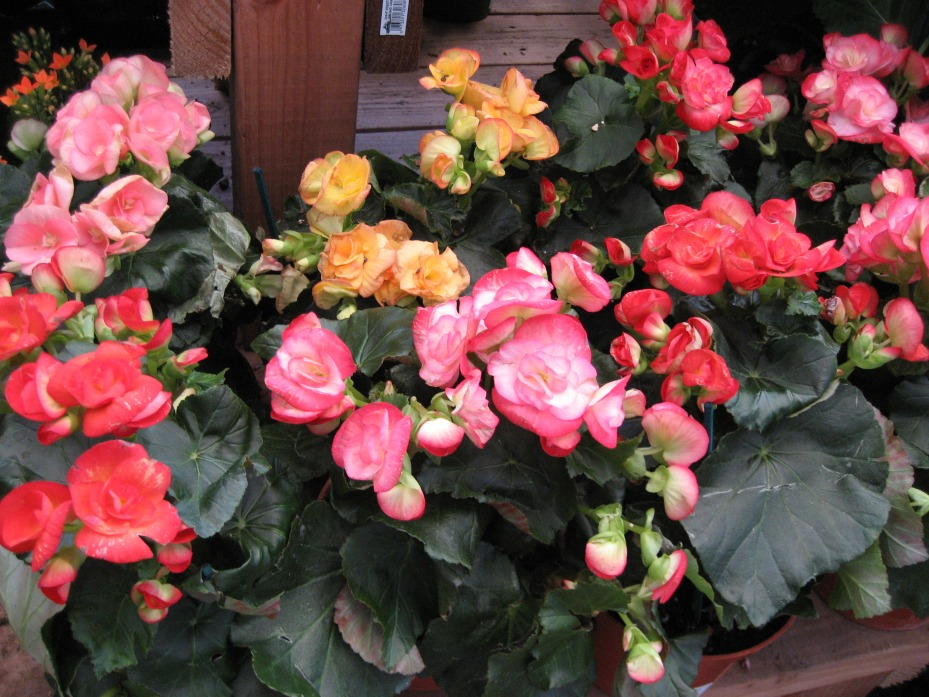
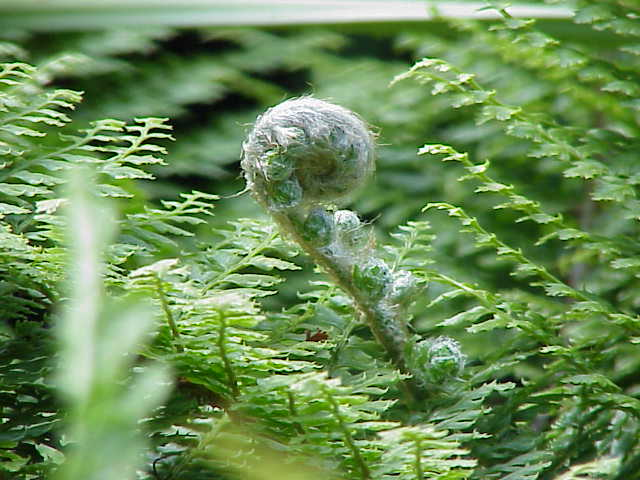
Left: Begonia in full bloom. Right: Fern Polystichum setiferum.

The park is home to some of the finest rainforests in Madagascar. In view of the varying altitude of the park, the type of vegetation is also of varying biodiversity. It is rich in forest vegetation (99% of the area is covered by forests) with many species of flora. The humid evergreen forest in the low-elevation zone of the park consists generally of a tree canopy of 15–20 metres (49–66 ft) in height with also 25-metre (82 ft) high emergents. The trees species in this low-elevation range are Tambourissa, Pterophylla, Diospyros, Cryptocarya agathophylla, and Dalbergia. The shrub area includes species of tree ferns Cyatheales and Cyatheales, Screw ferns (Lindsaea linearis) and Pandanus. The park also has secondary forest areas. Up to mid-altitudes, dense, humid evergreen forest are noted. Above this level, dense forest vegetation comprises sclerophyllous montane forests. The slopes of the forest are seen with denser shrubs with herbs (Impatiens, Begonia) and ferns Polystichum as dominant flora at the floor level of the forests. As a part of the overall forest setting, the flora reported from the park also include 60 species of orchids, 20 species of palms, and 500 or more species of woody plants.

== Fauna ==
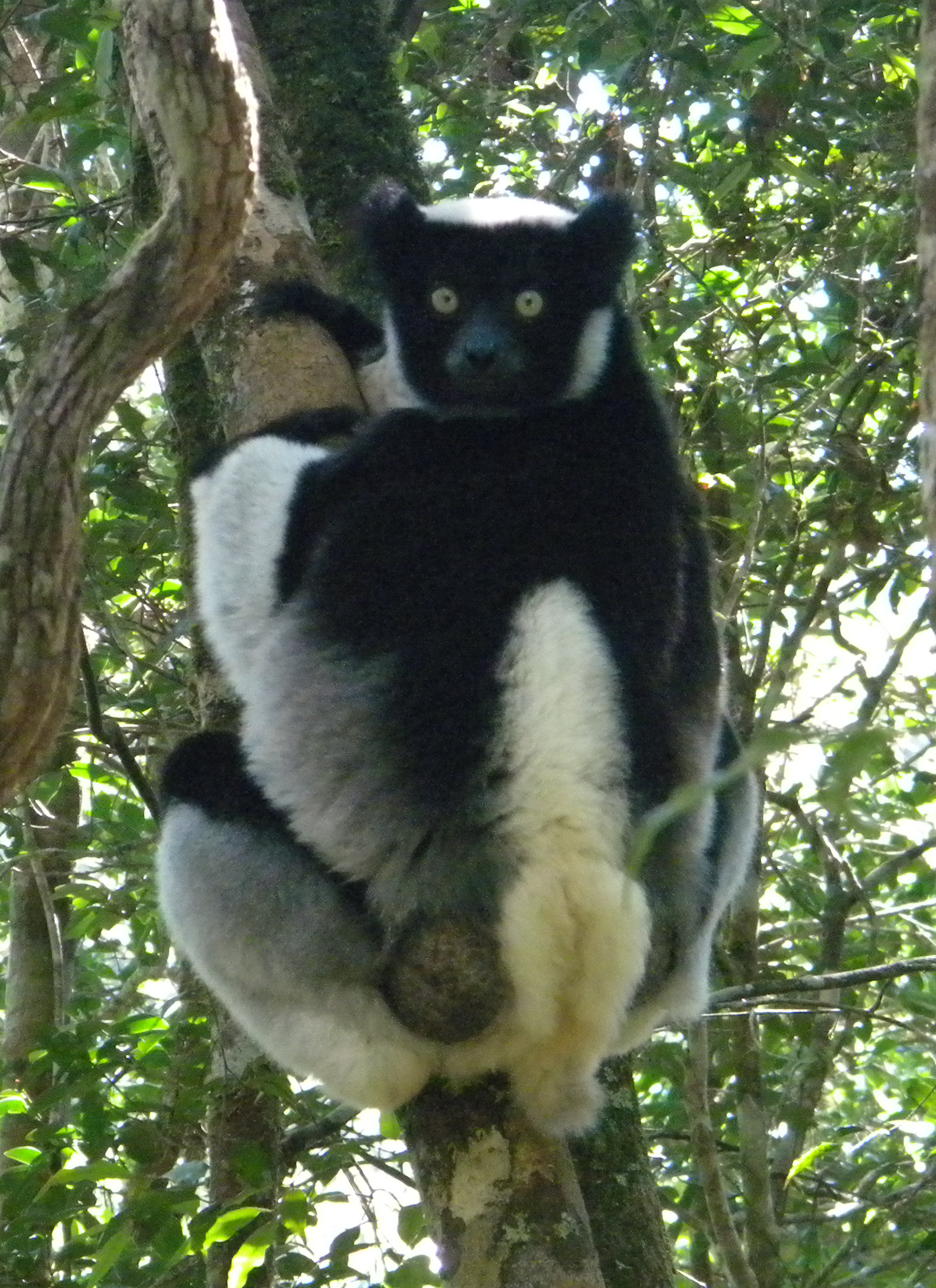
Indri

The fauna reported in the rainforests are found in all the national parks in the country. The reported fauna consists of 45 species of mammals including 13 species of lemurs which are: Diademed sifaka, black-and-white ruffed lemur, indri (Indri indri), hairy-eared dwarf lemur (Allocebus trichotis), aye-aye or the local endemic and endangered Lake Alaotra bamboo lemur. The endemic species in the park are: Malagasy primates consisting of five families which are lemurs; seven genera of Rodentia and six genera of Carnivora; 46 species of reptiles including Sanzinia madagascariensis (VU); 25 endemic and near-endemic species of mammals. Of these species, 22 are reported under threatened category, 8 species are under critically endangered list, 9 species are endangered, and 5 species are vulnerable. There are also many endemic species of Chiroptera.

=== Avifauna ===
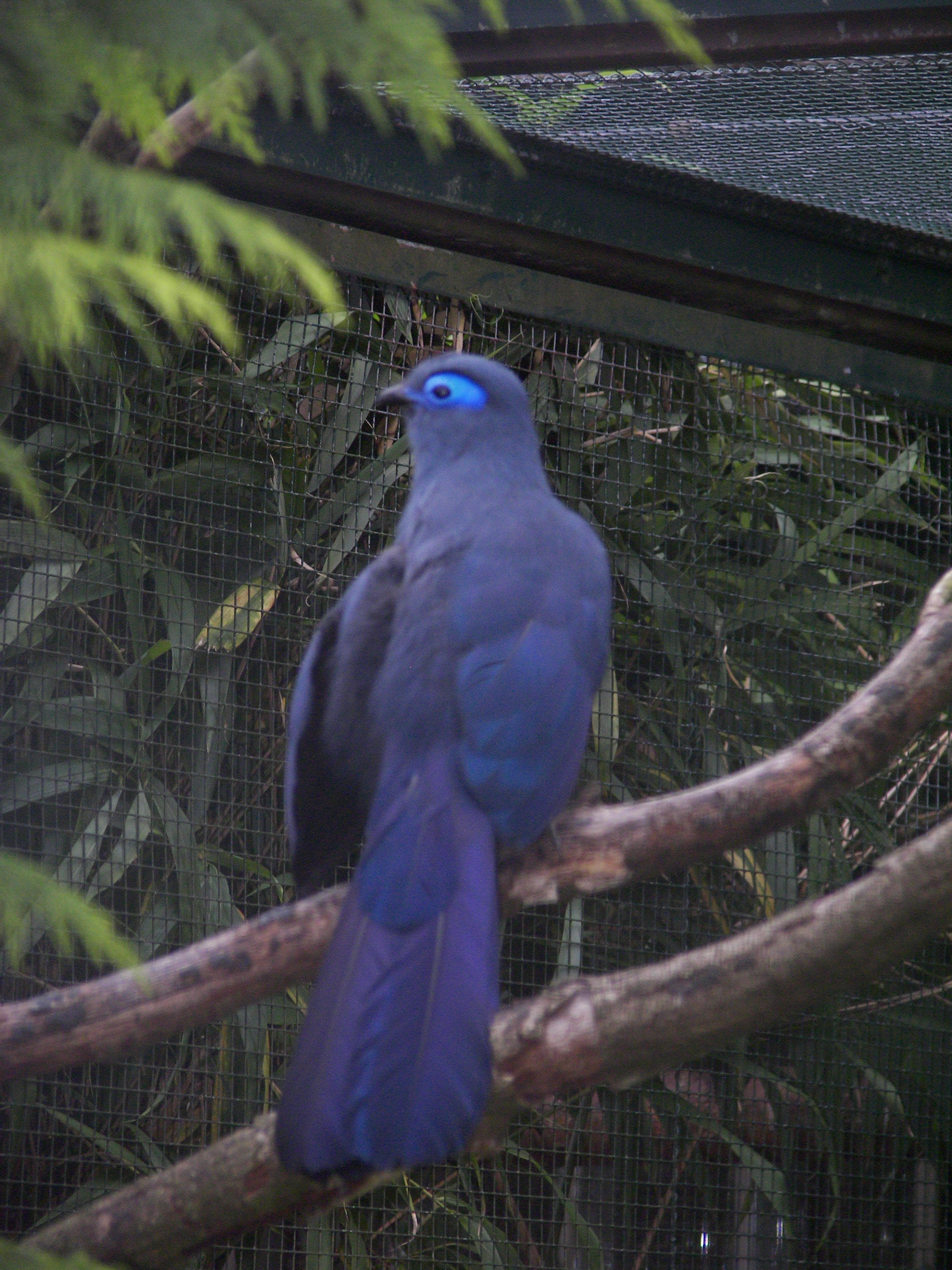
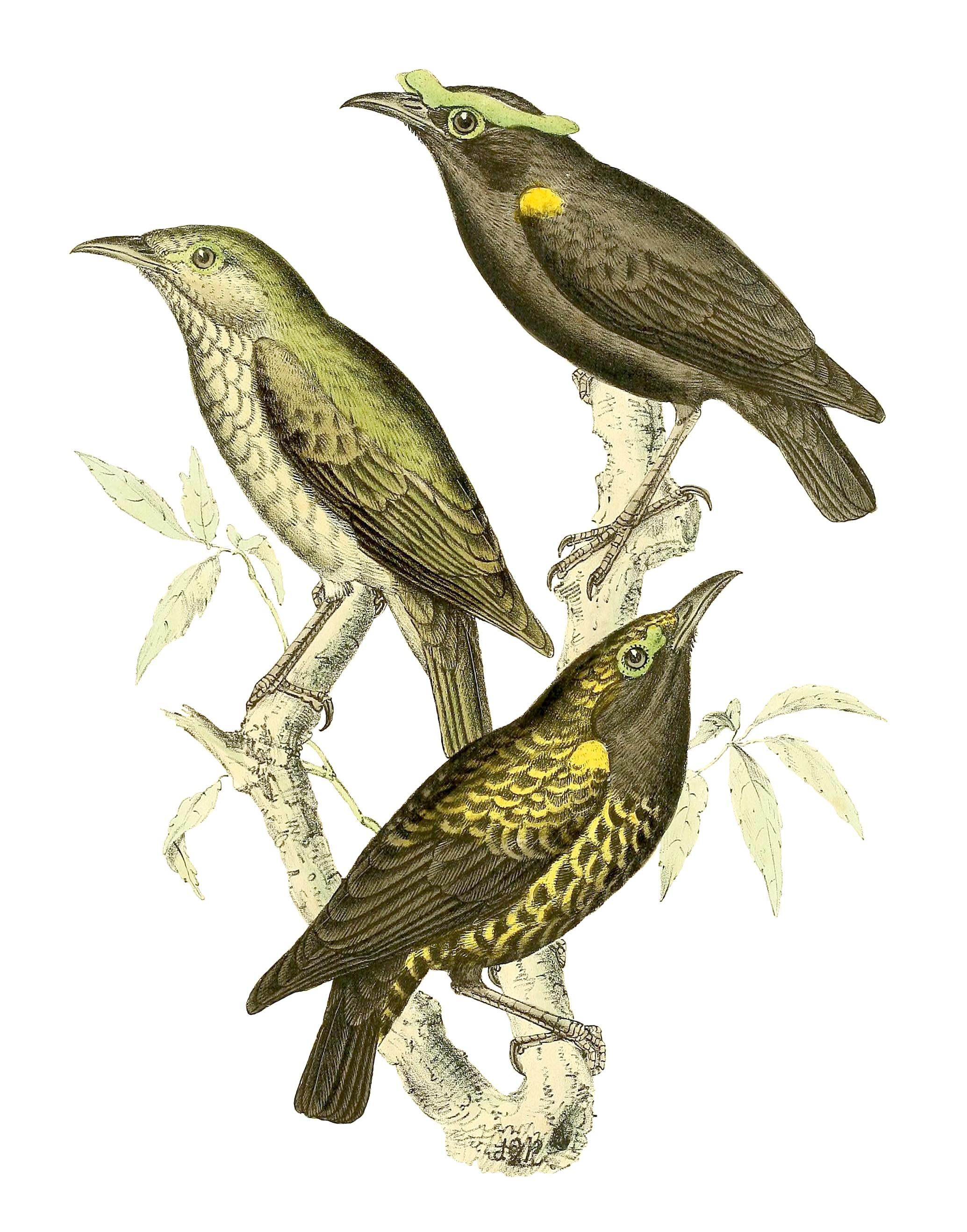
Left: blue coua endemic to Madagascar. Right: Philepitta castanea

The Bird Life International (IBA) identified a bird area of 731 square kilometres (282 sq mi) in 2001, in the total protected area including the park area. The park has a rich population of birds consisting of 112 species, and 67 of these species are reported to be endemic, the largest number in Madagascar. Notable species recorded are: the Madagascar serpent eagle (Eutriorchis astur), Madagascar sparrowhawk (Accipiter madagascariensis), Henst's goshawk (Accipiter henstii), Madagascar flufftail (Sarothrura insularis), Madagascar wood rail (Canirallus kioloides), Madagascar blue pigeon Alectroenas (madagascariensis), red owl (Tyto soumagnei), red-tailed newtonia (Newtonia fanovanae), Madagascar crested ibis (Lophotibis cristata), brown mesite (Mesitornis unicolor), red-breasted coua (serriana), red-fronted coua (reynaudii), red owl (Tyto soumagnei), blue coua (Coua caerulea), collared nightjar (Caprimulgus enarratus), velvet asity (Philepitta castanea), sunbird asity (Neodrepanis coruscans), helmet vanga (Euryceros prevostii), yellow-bellied asity (Neodrepanis hypoxantha), short-legged ground roller (Brachypteracias leptosomus), scaly ground roller (Brachypteracias squamiger), pitta-like ground roller (Atelornis pittoides), rufous-headed ground roller (Atelornis crossleyi), Bernier's vanga (Oriolia bernieri), Pollen's vanga (Xenopirostris polleni), helmet vanga (Euryceros prevostii), nuthatch vanga (Hypositta corallirostris), dark newtonia (Newtonia amphichroa), red-tailed newtonia (Newtonia fanovanae), Ward's flycatcher (Pseudobias wardi), Crossley's babbler (Mystacornis crossleyi), brown emutail (Bradypterus brunneus), white-throated oxylabes (Oxylabes madagascariensis), spectacled tetraka (Bernieria zosterops), dusky tetraka (Bernieria tenebrosa), grey-crowned tetraka (Bernieria cinereiceps), cryptic warbler (Cryptosylvicola randrianasoloi), Rand's warbler (Randia pseudozosterops), green jery (Neomixis viridis), wedge-tailed jery (Neomixis flavoviridis), forest rock thrush (Monticola sharpei), nelicourvi weaver (Ploceus nelicourvi), and forest fody (Foudia omissa).

=== Aquafauna ===
The aqua faunal species recorded in the park are 29 species of fishes and 62 species of amphibians.

== Conservation ==
The threat faced by the park is generally from the poor farmers who reside on the boundary of the park. As the agricultural yield from their farm lands is very low, they resort to encroachment of the park land and carry out hunting of wildlife in the park for their sustenance. Destruction of forests by "slash-and-burn cultivation and hunting (in the centre, east and north)", fires, poaching, cutting of precious trees such as rosewood and ebony, and also gem mining to small extent are some of the common threats to the biodiversity of the park.

The park is managed by Madagascar National Parks. As one of WWF's Global 200 priority eco-regions for conservation priority attention has been given by international agencies (such as the Wildlife Conservation Society and Conservation hiInternational, IUCN and NGOs) to carry out conservation activities in the park which involves prevention of encroachments and threat to wildlife. The progress in this respect is reported to be good.

The "Landscape Development Interventions Program" is in operation in the park. Under this programme, ensuring protection to the highland rainforest corridor that links the Zahamena Park and Andasibe-Mantadia National Park is one of the primary objectives. The other related activities initiated are the elimination of "rural poverty through agricultural intensification and sustainable management of natural resources". This programme is spread over five areas of increasing agriculture yields, enhanced conservation measures, and community participation in natural resource management.

== See also ==
- Rainforests of the Atsinanana
