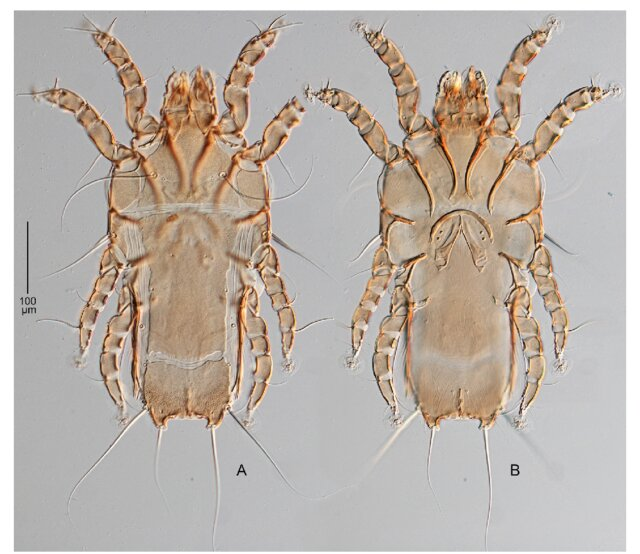
- Bernierinyssus oxylabis female

Scientific classification
- Kingdom: Animalia
- Phylum: Arthropoda
- Subphylum: Chelicerata
- Class: Arachnida
- Order: Sarcoptiformes
- Family: Pteronyssidae
- Genus: Bernierinyssus; Mironov, Klimov, Block & Oconnor, 2020

Type species
- Bernierinyssus bernieriae Mironov, Klimov, Block & Oconnor, 2020

= Bernierinyssus =

Genus of mites

Bernierinyssus is a genus of feather mite in the family Pteronyssidae, endemic to Madagascar. The six known species are specialist ectoparasites on Malagasy warblers (Bernieridae). The first known member of the genus, Bernierinyssus oxylabis, was originally described in 2005 as part of the genus Pteronyssoides. In 2020, the genus Bernierinyssus was created to accommodate B. oxylabis and five additional species. The genus is highly host-specific, with each bird host species usually harboring a single species of mite.

== Description ==
The technical description of the genus Bernierinyssus is as follows (for both sexes:) Medium-sized. Epimerites I free. Unpaired seta vi present. Prodorsal shield trapezoidal or pear-shaped, occupying median area of prodorsum, not encompassing setae c1; scapular setae se and si situated on this shield, or se in its lateral incision. Setae c2 filiform, commonly short, length less than half the distance between setae se. Setae c3 long, with lanceolate enlargement in basal 2/3. Dorsal palpal setae dTi simple, filiform. Setae ba of tarsi I–II simple, short. Genu I with single solenidion σ longer than solenidion ω1 on tarsus I. Tarsus III with 5 setae. Ventral membrane of tarsus I, in most species, about 1/2–2/3 the length of the segment. Surface of coxal fields I, II covered with striated tegument.

Species of Bernierinyssus are morphologically most similar to the genus Sturnotrogus, which are ectoparasites of starlings (Sturnidae).

== Species ==
The following is a list of all known members of Bernierinyssus and their respective host species:

- Bernierinyssus angulatus Mironov, Klimov, Block & Oconnor, 2020 - Madagascar yellowbrow (Crossleyia xanthophrys)
- Bernierinyssus bernieriae Mironov, Klimov, Block & Oconnor, 2020 - Long-billed bernieria (Bernieria madagascariensis)
- Bernierinyssus bifenestratus Mironov, Klimov, Block & Oconnor, 2020 - Wedge-tailed jery (Hartertula flavoviridis)
- Bernierinyssus oxylabis Mironov & Wauthy, 2005 - White-throated oxylabes (Oxylabes madagascariensis)
- Bernierinyssus randiae Mironov, Klimov, Block & Oconnor, 2020 - Rand's warbler (Randia pseudozosterops)
- Bernierinyssus xanthomixis Mironov, Klimov, Block & Oconnor, 2020 - Spectacled tetraka (Xanthomixis zosterops), grey-crowned tetraka (Xanthomixis cinereiceps)
