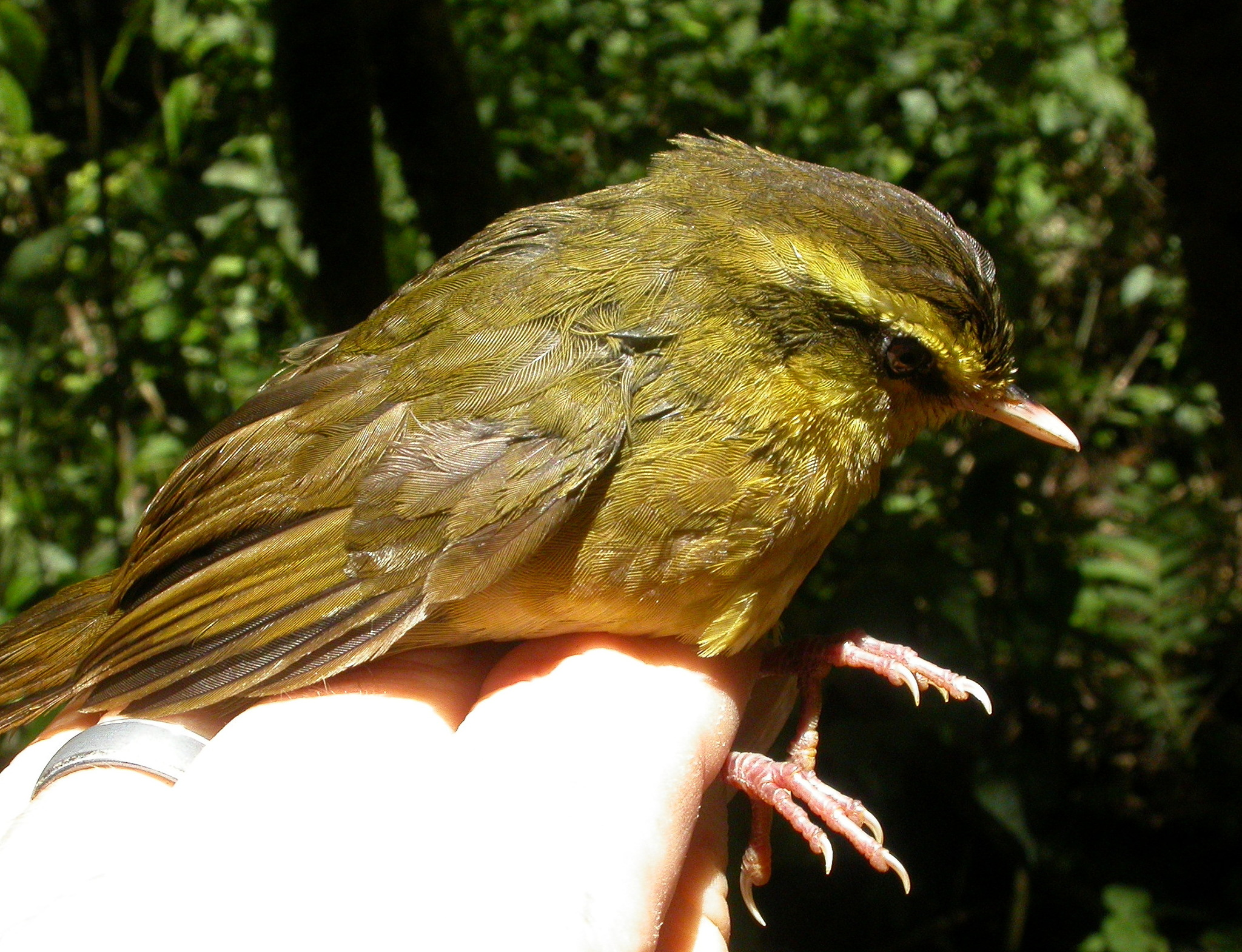
- Yellow-browed Oxylabes photographed in Fianarantsoa Province, Madagascar

Conservation status
- Least Concern (IUCN 3.1)

Scientific classification
- Kingdom: Animalia
- Phylum: Chordata
- Class: Aves
- Order: Passeriformes
- Family: Bernieridae
- Genus: Crossleyia; Hartlaub, 1877
- Species: C. xanthophrys

Binomial name
- Crossleyia xanthophrys (Sharpe, 1875)

= Madagascar yellowbrow =

Species of bird

The Madagascan yellowbrow (Crossleyia xanthophrys), also known as the yellow-browed oxylabes, is a species of Malagasy warbler, formerly placed in the family Sylviidae. Found only in Madagascar, it was previously the sole member of the genus Crossleyia until the rare and endangered dusky tetraka (formerly in the genus Xanthomixis) was moved to Crossleyia based on a molecular genetic study published online in 2019. Its natural habitat is subtropical or tropical moist montane forests. It is threatened by habitat loss.
