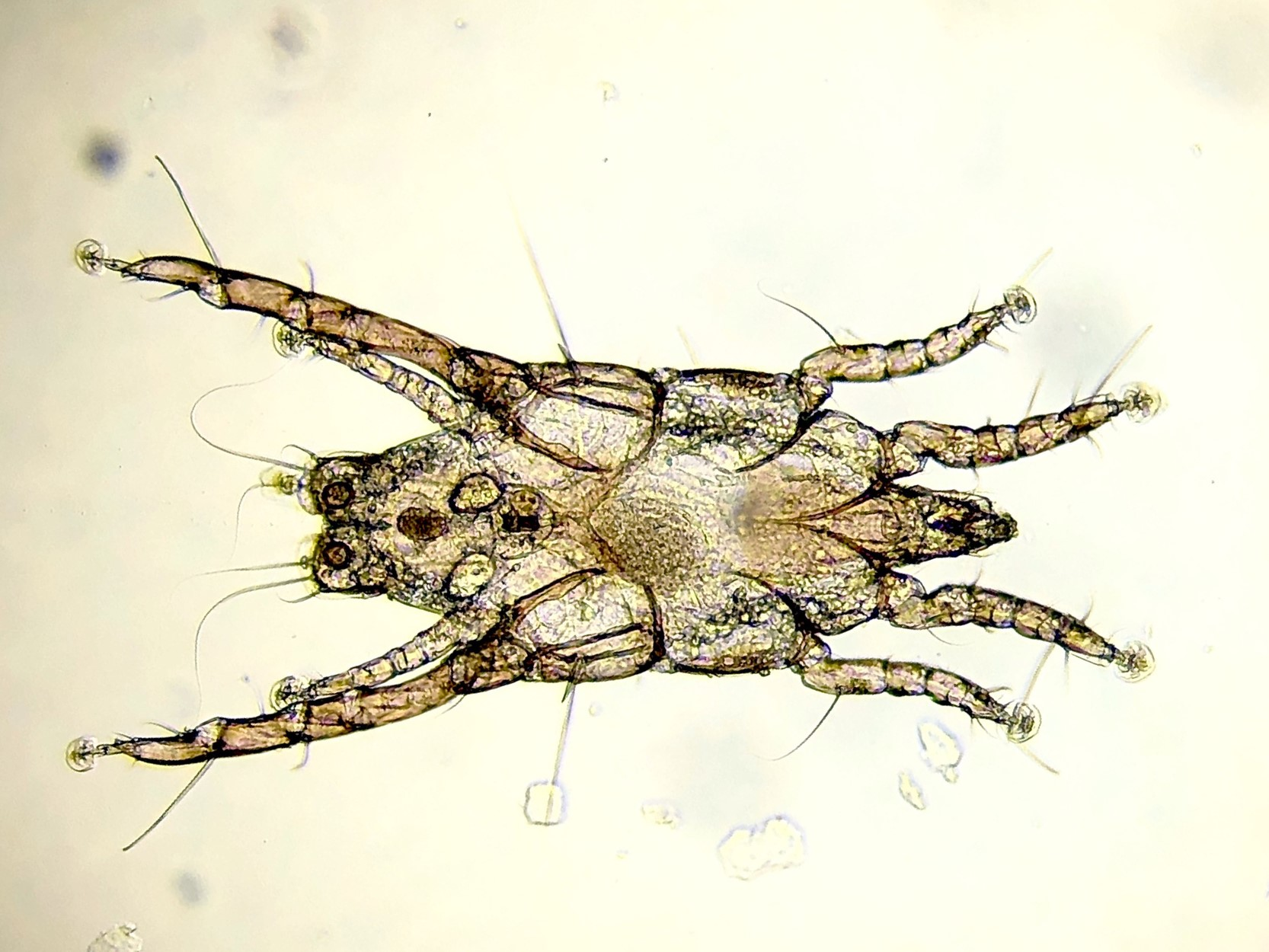
- Pteroherpus sp.

Scientific classification
- Kingdom: Animalia
- Phylum: Arthropoda
- Subphylum: Chelicerata
- Class: Arachnida
- Order: Sarcoptiformes
- Superfamily: Analgoidea
- Family: Pteronyssidae; Oudemans, 1941

Synonyms
- Hyonyssinae Atyeo & Gaud, 1981

= Pteronyssidae =

Family of mites

The Pteronyssidae are a family of the Acarina (mite) order Sarcoptiformes. They contain many feather mites.

== Selected genera ==
- Anephippius
- Bernierinyssus
- Cleyastobius
- Conomerus
- Dicrurobius
- Hyonyssus
- Metapteronyssus
- Micropteroherpus
- Monapsidus
- Mouchetia
- Neopteronyssus
- Parapteronyssus
- Pegopteronyssus
- Pteroherpus
- Pteronyssoides
- Pteronyssus
- Pterotrogus
- Ramphastobius
- Scutulanyssus
- Stenopteronyssus
- Timalinyssus
- Vanginyssus
- Zygepigynia
