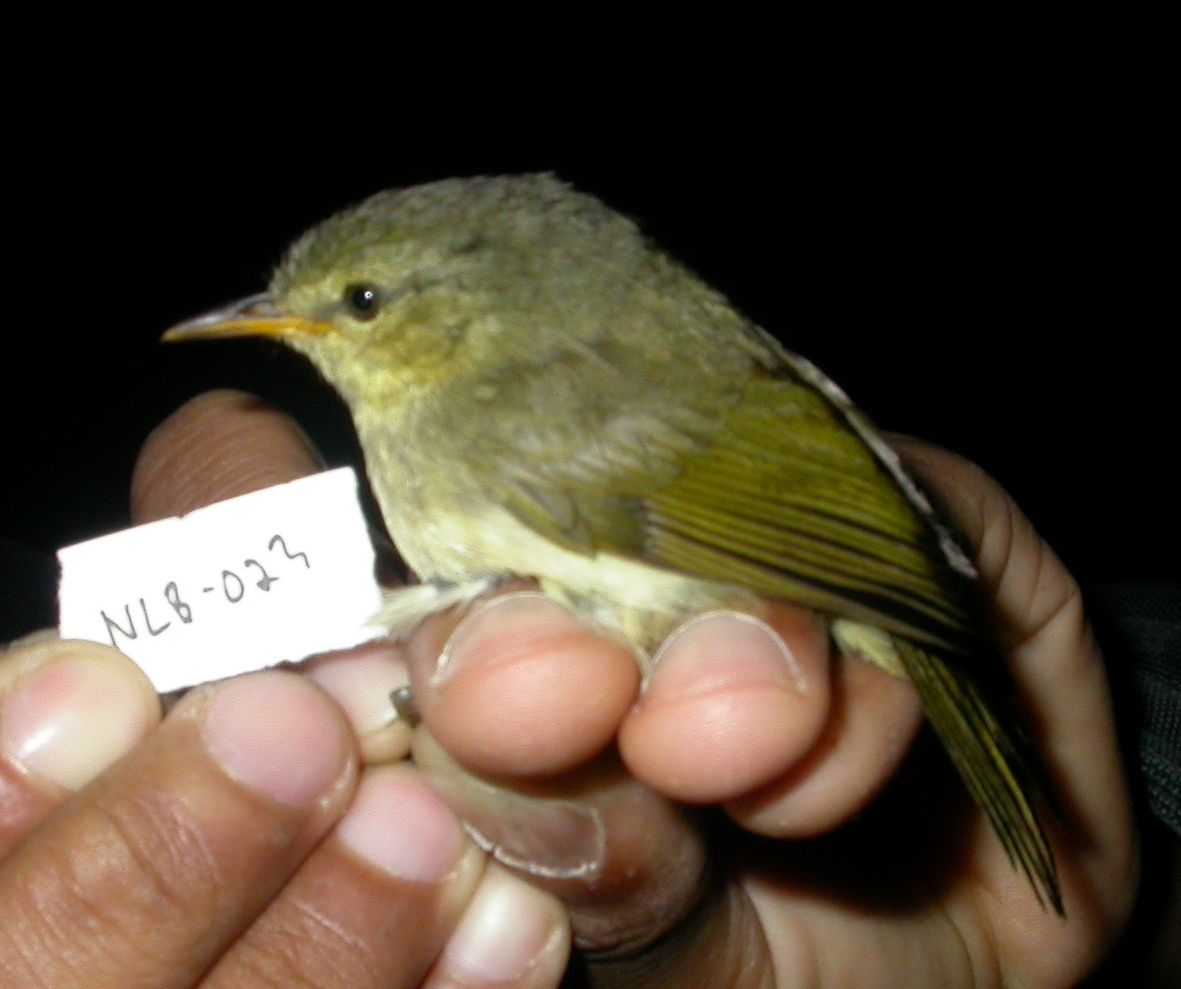

Conservation status
- Least Concern (IUCN 3.1)

Scientific classification
- Kingdom: Animalia
- Phylum: Chordata
- Class: Aves
- Order: Passeriformes
- Family: Bernieridae
- Genus: Cryptosylvicola; Goodman, Langrand & Whitney, 1996
- Species: C. randrianasoloi

Binomial name
- Cryptosylvicola randrianasoloi Goodman, Langrand & Whitney, 1996

= Cryptic warbler =

Species of bird

The cryptic warbler (Cryptosylvicola randrianasoloi) is a species of Malagasy warbler in the family Bernieridae. It was formerly placed in the Old World warbler family Sylviidae. It was first discovered in 1992 near the Analamazaotra Special Reserve in Madagascar, and is endemic to the forests on the eastern part of island between Anjanaharibe-Sud Special Reserve and Andohahela National Park.

== Taxonomy and systematics ==
The cryptic warbler was first identified as a new species in November 1992, when an unknown passerine was photographed, tape recorded and collected from Maromizaha Forest, Eastern Madagascar. Seven days later, the same species was tape recorded at Ranomafana National Park. Additionally, two specimens of the unknown species were collected from Andrigitra Forest a year later in 1993.

The species was later described from these specimens as belonging to a new genus and species, Cryptosylvicola randrianasoloi. The generic name Cryptosylvicola was formed from Greek Kryptos, meaning hidden, Latin silva, meaning forest and Latin cola, meaning inhabitant. The name therefore translates to "hidden forest inhabitant". The specific epithet randrianasoloi honors the Malagasy ornithologist Georges randrianasolo.

The cryptic warbler was initially placed in the family Sylviidae based on its resemblance to other members of the family. However, it was later discovered through genetic study that it belongs to the Bernieridae, an endemic family of birds to Madagascar. Within the family, it forms an outgroup to a clade containing the long-billed berneria and white-throated oxylabes.

== Description ==
The cryptic warbler is a small passerine with an olive-green back and grayish yellow underside. It has a relatively indistinctive supercilium and eyestripe. The upper bill is dark and the lower bill is pale pink.

On average, adults measure 11 centimetres (4.3 in) from bill tip to the end of the tail, and weigh 8.4 grams (0.30 oz).

== Habitat ==
Although found in many habitats, the cryptic warbler prefers evergreen, humid rain forest between 900–2,100 metres (3,000–6,900 ft) elevation. It can be found in the canopy and sub-canopy of trees and shrubs between 2–25 metres (7–82 ft) off the ground, with a diet consisting of insects. Its breeding season lasts from October to December.
