= Alfred Crossley =

British scientific collector (1839–1877)

Alfred Crossley (11 August 1839 – 28 February 1877) was a seaman and natural history collector who explored and collected specimens from Madagascar. A number of species were described from his collections, several named after him including Cheirogaleus crossleyi, Mystacornis crossleyi, and Euxanthe crossleyi. The bird genus Crossleyia is also named in his honour.

Crossley was born in Halifax, Yorkshire, to Hannah and was the grandson of carpet weaver William Crossley. He was baptized on 13th October 1839. Little is known of his life but he became a seaman and was shipwrecked on Madagascar. He was held prisoner and slave for two years before he escaped. This is thought to have been during the reign of Queen Ranavalona I. In 1864 he married Sarah Ambler, daughter of Charles Parker, a blacksmith. In 1869 he was sent to collect natural history specimens from Madagascar with support from Christopher Ward of Halifax. A natural history collector mainly interested in butterflies who recruited him to collect on Madagascar on account of his knowledge of the region. It is suggested that he was trained to collect and process natural history specimens by William Cutter, a dealer in London. Crossley sent a large number of specimens back to collectors in England and France. Ward described many new species from Madagascar until 1873 at which point he likely stopped supporting Crossley. Bowdler Sharpe received bird specimens from Cameroon from Crossley in 1870-71. Many of the specimens were collected by local hunters using blowdarts. In 1876 he married Rebecca, daughter of a vocalist William Dennis, in Halifax. He went on another collecting expedition but died at Tamatave at the age of 37. Alfred Grandidier noted that Crossley had visited the island between 1869 and 1872 and gave the areas where Crossley had collected. Crossley and Grandidier were aware of each other and may even have met in Madagascar but they came from very different social classes. He however met the French collector Josef Peter Audebert.
