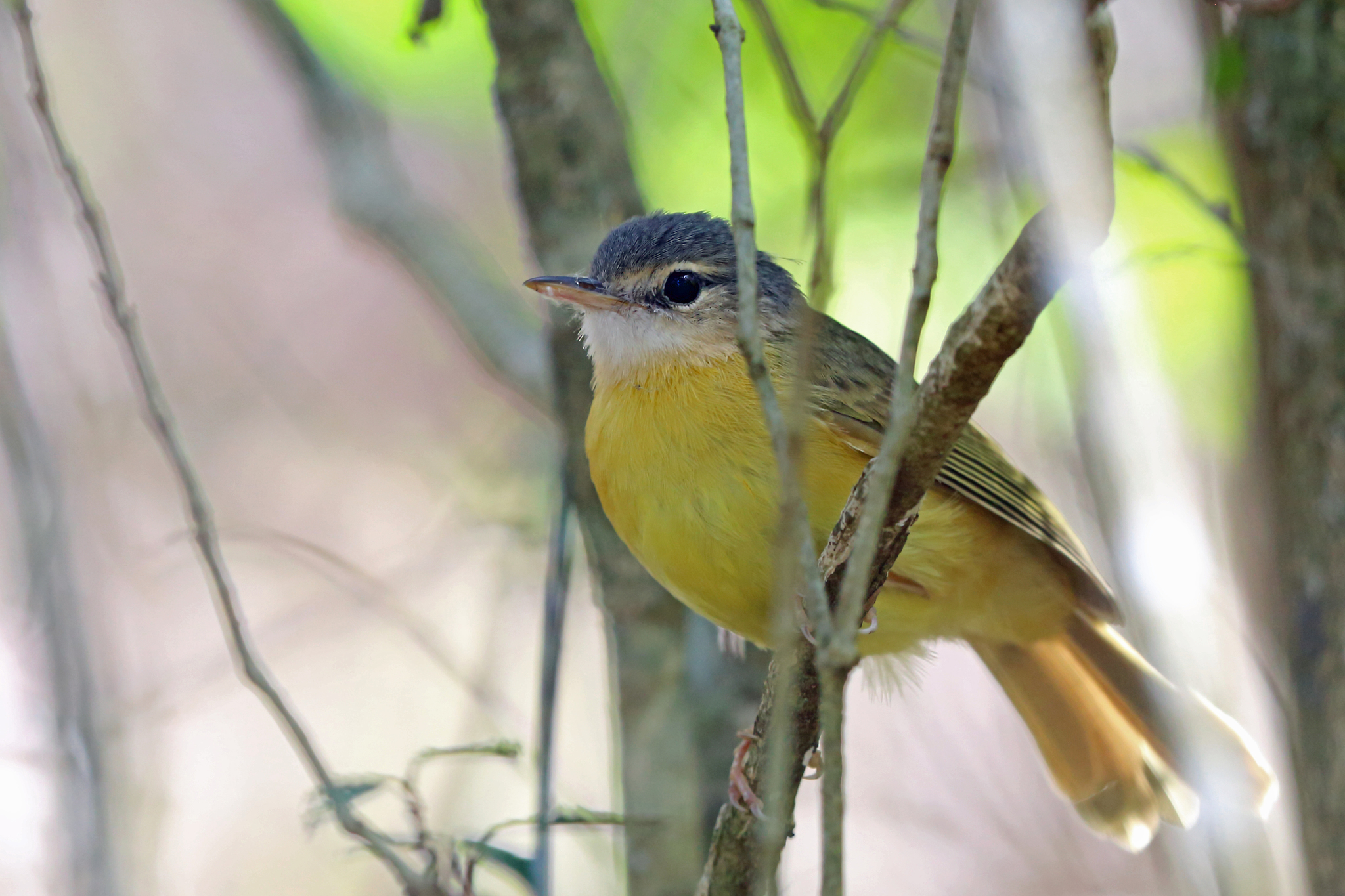

Conservation status
- Vulnerable (IUCN 3.1)

Scientific classification
- Kingdom: Animalia
- Phylum: Chordata
- Class: Aves
- Order: Passeriformes
- Family: Bernieridae
- Genus: Xanthomixis
- Species: X. apperti

Binomial name
- Xanthomixis apperti (Colston, 1972)

Synonyms
- Phyllastrephus apperti Bernieria apperti

= Appert's tetraka =

Species of bird

Appert's tetraka formerly known as Appert's greenbul (Xanthomixis apperti) is a small passerine bird endemic to the south-west of Madagascar. The species was only described in 1972, and has been the subject of considerable taxonomic confusion. It was initially placed in the greenbul genus Phyllastrephus, and later with the Old World warblers in the genus Bernieria. Recent research indicates it is part of an endemic Malagasy radiation currently known as the Malagasy warblers (Cibois et al. 2001).

The Appert's tetraka is around 15 cm (5.9 in) long with a pink bill and grey legs. The plumage of the sexes is similar; the back, tail and wings are green (the wings being a darker shade), the head grey and the throat white. The flanks and belly are washed orange and the undersides are white. The species is highly terrestrial, feeding in undisturbed forest in shrubs near the ground and on the ground. Family groups of up to 8 birds, sometimes in association with other species, forage on insects gleaned from under leaves and branches.

The Appert's tetraka is currently restricted to two known locations in south-west Madagascar. One is the dry deciduous forest at Zombitse-Vohibasia National Park (where the species was first discovered) and a second population in montane evergreen forest at Analavelona Classified Forest. The species is considered vulnerable due to its restricted range, particularly to habitat loss due to forest clearance. At present the Zombitse-Vohibasia forest is the subject of conservation projects that have stopped deforestation, and the Analavelona Classified Forest, while not protected, is remote and not under immediate threat.

The common name and scientific name commemorate the Reverend Otto Appert, a Swiss missionary in Madagascar who was also an amateur naturalist.
