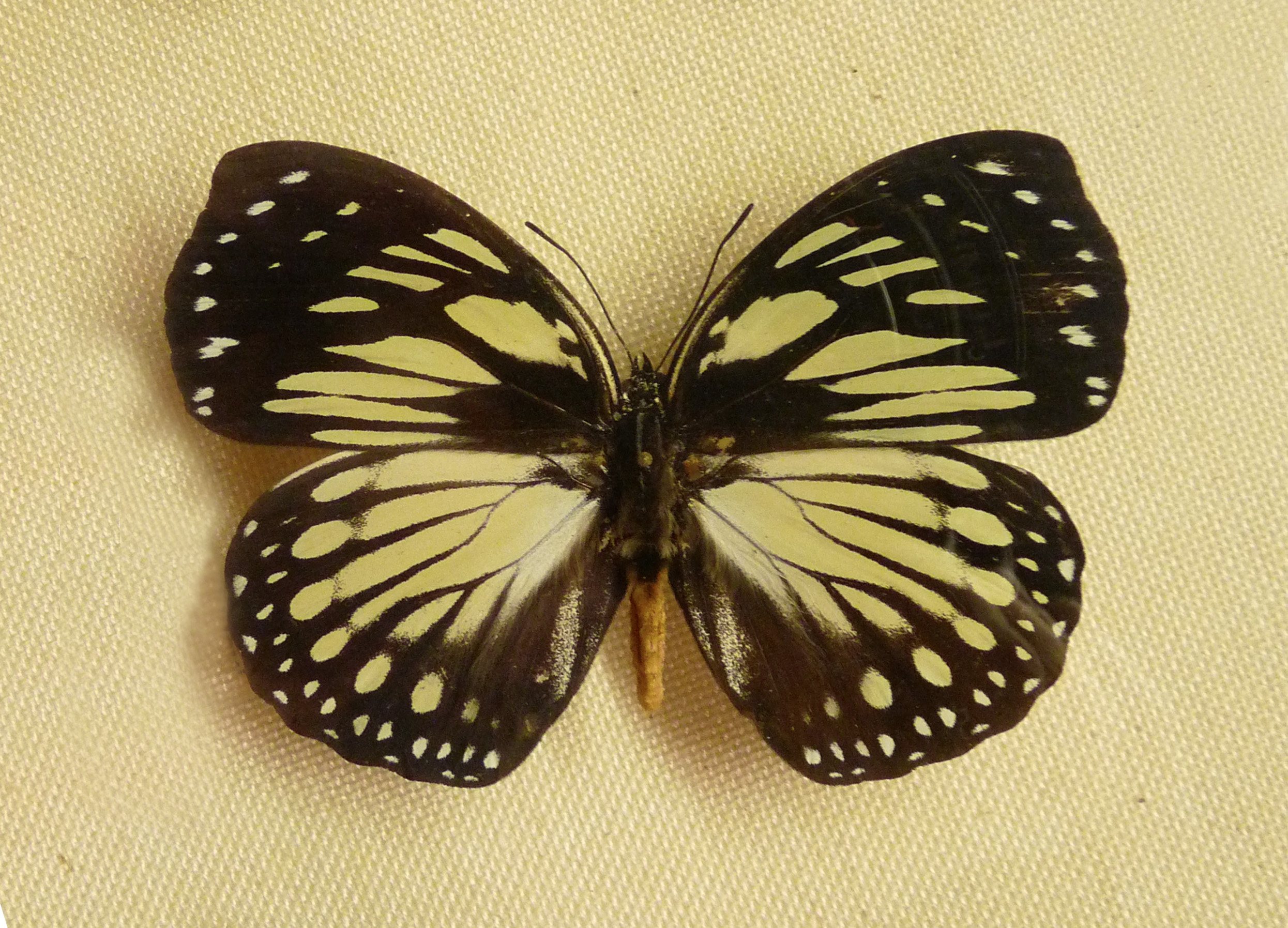

Scientific classification
- Domain: Eukaryota
- Kingdom: Animalia
- Phylum: Arthropoda
- Class: Insecta
- Order: Lepidoptera
- Family: Nymphalidae
- Genus: Euxanthe
- Species: E. crossleyi

Binomial name
- Euxanthe crossleyi (Ward, 1871)

Synonyms
- Godartia crossleyi Ward, 1871; Charaxes crossleyi; Euxanthe crossleyi radiata Niepelt, 1934; Euxanthe crossleyi niepelti Stichel, 1939; Euxanthe ansorgei Rothschild, 1903; Euxanthe crossleyi f. babingtoni Stoneham, 1943; Euxanthe crossleyi intermedia Joicey and Talbot, 1921

= Euxanthe crossleyi =

Species of butterfly

Euxanthe crossleyi, the Crossley's forest queen, is a butterfly in the family Nymphalidae. It is found in Nigeria, Cameroon, Gabon, the Republic of the Congo, the Central African Republic, the Democratic Republic of the Congo, Zambia, Sudan, Uganda, Rwanda, Burundi, Kenya and Tanzania. The habitat consists of lowland evergreen forest and riverine forests.

Adults are attracted to fermented bananas.

The larvae feed on Blighia zambesiaca, Blighia unijugata, Deinbollia and Phialodiscus species.

It is named after the specimen collector Alfred Crossley.

== Subspecies ==
- Euxanthe crossleyi crossleyi (Nigeria, Cameroon, Gabon, Congo, Central African Republic, western Democratic Republic of the Congo, north-western Zambia)
- Euxanthe crossleyi ansorgei Rothschild, 1903 (southern Sudan, Uganda, Rwanda, Burundi, western Kenya, western Tanzania)
- Euxanthe crossleyi claudiae Rousseau-Decelle, 1934 (southern Democratic Republic of the Congo)
- Euxanthe crossleyi magnifica Rebel, 1914 (eastern Democratic Republic of the Congo, Uganda, north-western Tanzania).
