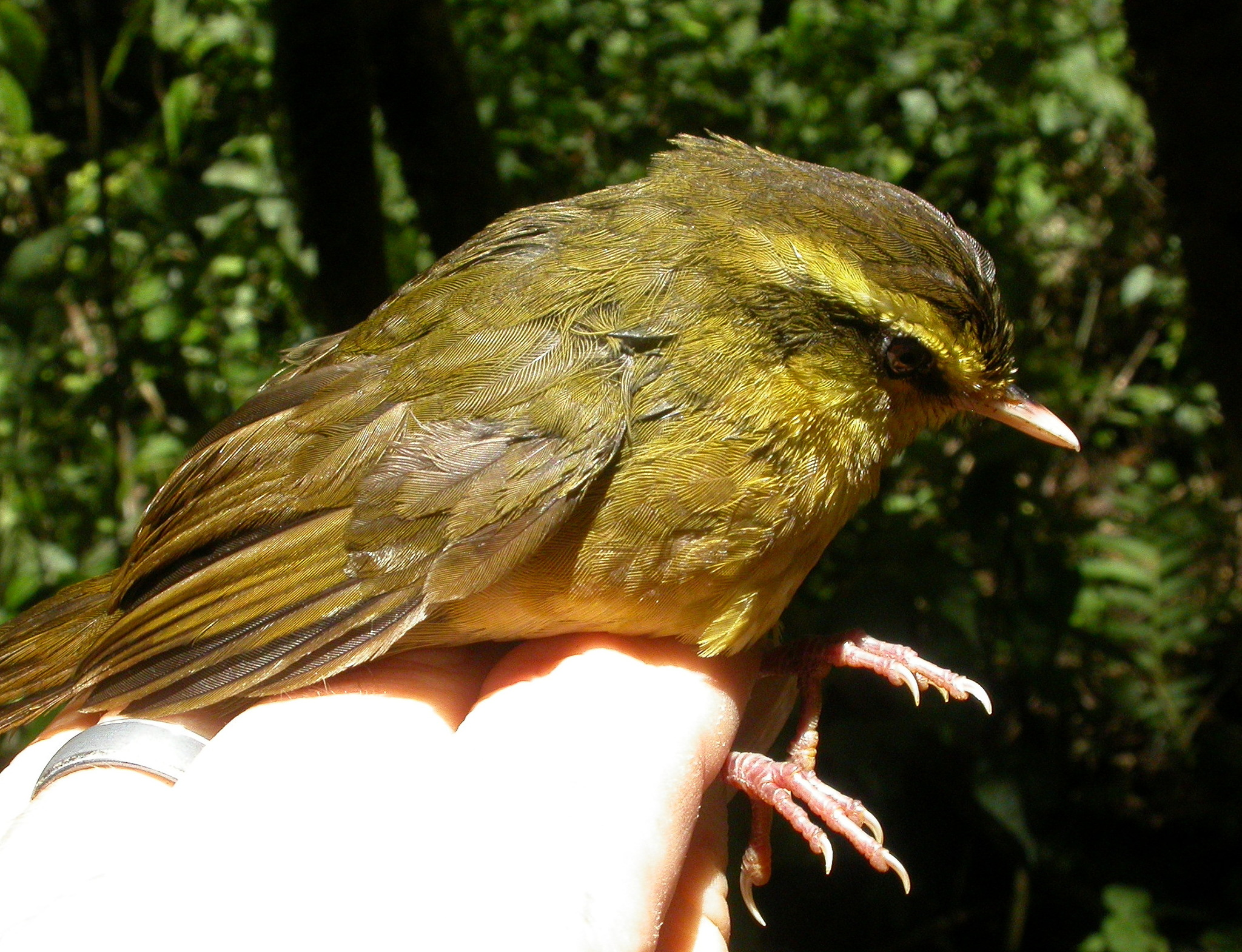
- Crossleyia xanthophrys

Scientific classification
- Kingdom: Animalia
- Phylum: Chordata
- Class: Aves
- Order: Passeriformes
- Family: Bernieridae
- Genus: Crossleyia; Hartlaub, 1877

= Crossleyia =

Genus of birds

Crossleyia is a genus of birds in the Malagasy warbler family, Bernieridae. The genus is named after the natural history collector Alfred Crossley.

== Species ==
Image	Common name	Scientific name	Distribution
	Madagascar yellowbrow	Crossleyia xanthophrys	Eastern Madagascar
	Dusky tetraka	Crossleyia tenebrosa	Northeastern Madagascar
