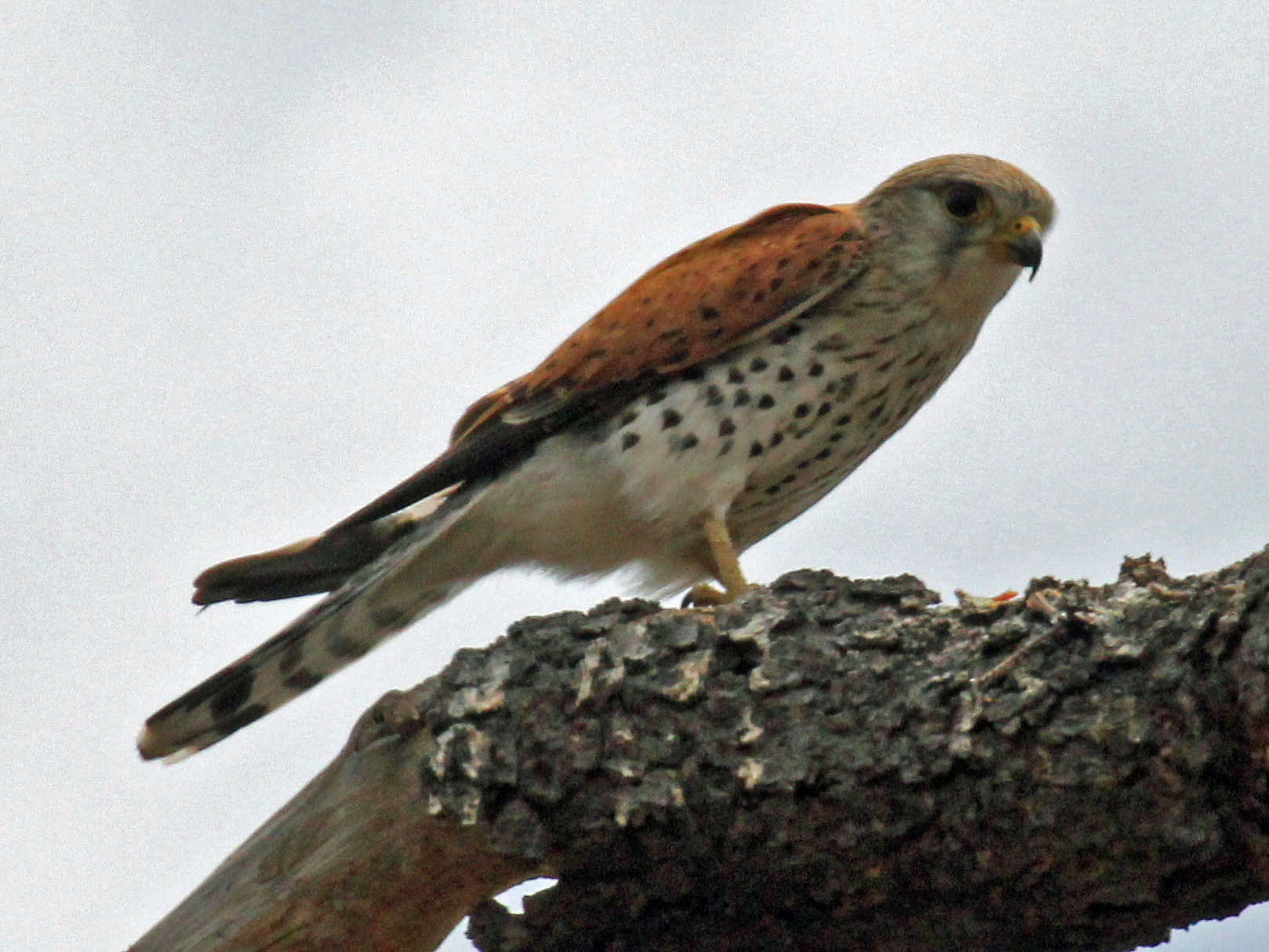

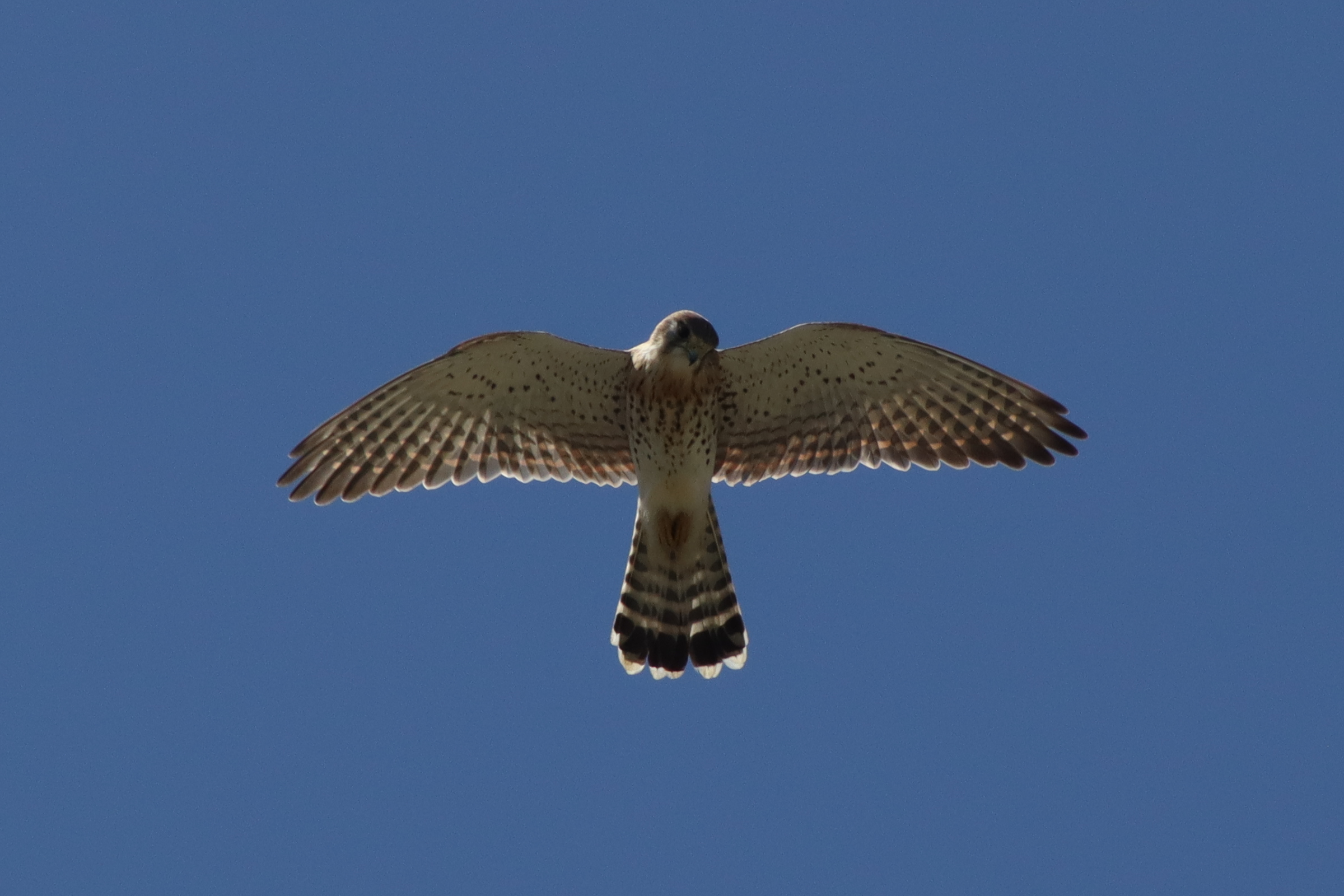

Conservation status
- Least Concern (IUCN 3.1)
- CITES Appendix II (Note: The population of the Seychelles is listed in Appendix I.)

Scientific classification
- Kingdom: Animalia
- Phylum: Chordata
- Class: Aves
- Order: Falconiformes
- Family: Falconidae
- Genus: Falco
- Species: F. newtoni

Binomial name
- Falco newtoni (Gurney, JH Sr, 1863)

Subspecies
- Falco newtoni newtoni (Gurney, JH Sr, 1863); Falco newtoni aldabranus Grote, 1928

= Malagasy kestrel =

Species of bird

The Malagasy kestrel (Falco newtoni), also known as the Madagascar kestrel, Malagasy spotted kestrel, Newton's kestrel, Madagascar spotted kestrel, katiti (Creole) or hitsikitsika (Malagasy), is a small bird of prey of the genus Falco. It is named after British ornithologist Edward Newton. It occurs in two subspecies on Madagascar and at Aldabra. The race from Aldabra is also called Aldabra kestrel (Falco newtoni aldabranus). Its closest living relative is the Seychelles kestrel; they were at one time considered conspecific. Their common ancestors appear to have diverged very recently, probably less than 1 million years ago during the Early or Middle Pleistocene. The Mauritius kestrel is more distantly related (Groombridge et al. 2002).

== Description ==
It can reach a size of 30 cm. The wings are 180 mm to 195 mm at the males and 188 mm to 203 mm at the females. The males can reach a weight between 112 and 118 grams. The weight of the females is up to 128 grams. The head and the nape of the males is rufous grey with dark streaks. A dark moustachial streak running from the basis of the bill backwards to sides of the throat. The upperparts and the wingcoverts are chestnut with black spots. The uppertail coverts are grey with blackish spots. The long flight feathers are blackish brown, the inner webs are covered with white and chestnut spots. The underparts are whitish. The short flight feathers are chestnut coloured and dark banded. The chest, belly and underwing coverts are covered with black spots. The tail is grey coloured. It has six to seven narrow black bars and a broad subterminal bar. All feathers have white tips. In addition there is a rufous phase. At this morph the head and nape are almost black. Body and underwing coverts are dark chestnut brown with black streaks and spots. The throat exhibits a buffish-white hue. The underwing coverts are greyish white and spotted black. The head of the females is stronger chestnut coloured. The underparts are more spotted and the tail is brown with black bars. Both sexes exhibits a slate grey bill with a black tip. The cere is yellow. The legs are either yellow or bright orange (rufous morph). The juveniles are similar coloured as the females.

== Distribution and habitat ==
The Malagasy kestrel has a large range of occurrence and it is native to Madagascar, Mayotte, and the Comores. It is a breeding resident on Madagascar where it occurs in savannas and wetlands but also artificial landscapes in the vicinity of human settlements in altitudes from 0 to 2000 asl. It is uncommon in forests. The habitat of the Aldabra kestrel is the Aldabran Island of Grande Terre but there is also evidence for the island of Anjouan at the Comores.

=== Reproduction ===
The Malagasy kestrel usually nests on rock ledges, in buildings, in tree holes, or in the stick nests of other birds, such as the pied crow. Four to six eggs are laid, usually in September, and are incubated by the female only, who is fed by the male at regular intervals during incubation.

=== Diet ===
Insects take up the majority of the Malagasy kestrel's diet, which are usually taken during flight, but it also occasionally eats small birds, frogs, and mammals, all of which are taken on the ground. It hunts from a low perch, hawking or hovering with the wing, at dawn or dusk.

=== Voice ===
The Malagasy kestrel's call consists of a sharp scream of iitsi, kitsi, kitsi, kitsi or a loud repeated twitter.
