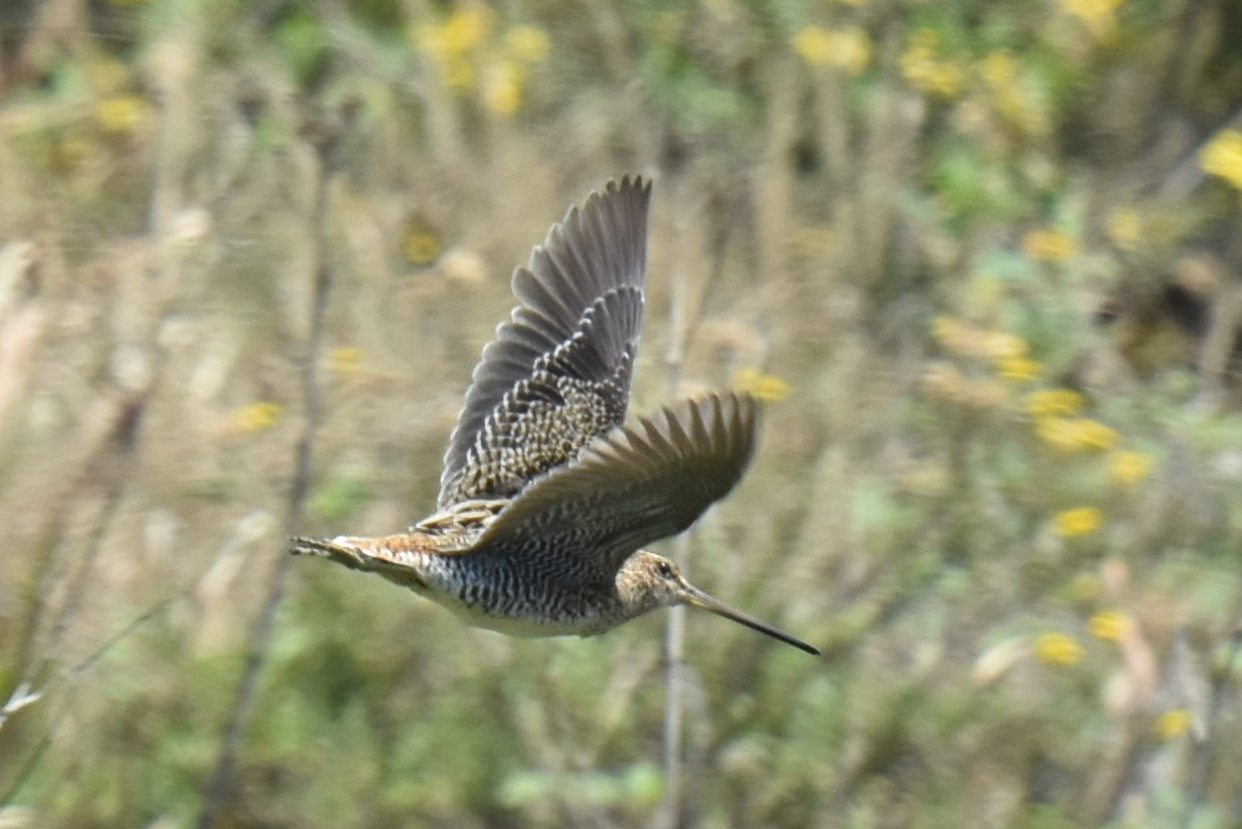

Conservation status
- Vulnerable (IUCN 3.1)

Scientific classification
- Kingdom: Animalia
- Phylum: Chordata
- Class: Aves
- Order: Charadriiformes
- Family: Scolopacidae
- Genus: Gallinago
- Species: G. macrodactyla

Binomial name
- Gallinago macrodactyla Bonaparte, 1839

= Madagascar snipe =

Species of bird

The Madagascar snipe (Gallinago macrodactyla) is a small stocky wader. It breeds only in the humid eastern half of Madagascar, from sea-level up to 2,700 m, being more common above 700 m. It is non-migratory.

== Description ==
This is a large and heavy snipe, between 29 and 32 cm long with a stocky body and relatively short legs. Its upperparts, head and neck are streaked and patterned with bold, dark brown stripes and gold edges to the feathers forming lines down its back. The belly is white, with some brown barring on the flanks but never on the belly. The blackish bill is very long, straight and fairly robust. The legs and feet are yellowish-olive to greenish-grey. The sexes are similar, and immature differ only in showing buff fringes on the wing coverts.

The Madagascar snipe makes a hoarse hlip call as it takes off. In flight, it has a narrow grey trailing edge on the wing and a dark underwing.

The Madagascar snipe has never been recorded elsewhere, and no other snipe species have yet been recorded on Madagascar. Common snipe is smaller, has a paler underwing, and a white trailing edges on the wing. Pin-tailed snipe is similar in plumage to the Madagascar species, but is smaller, shorter-billed and shorter-tailed. African snipe is similar in build to the Madagascar Snipe, but has an obvious white trailing edge on the wing. All the snipes that are potential vagrants to Madagascar have a faster, lighter flight than the resident species.

== Behaviour ==
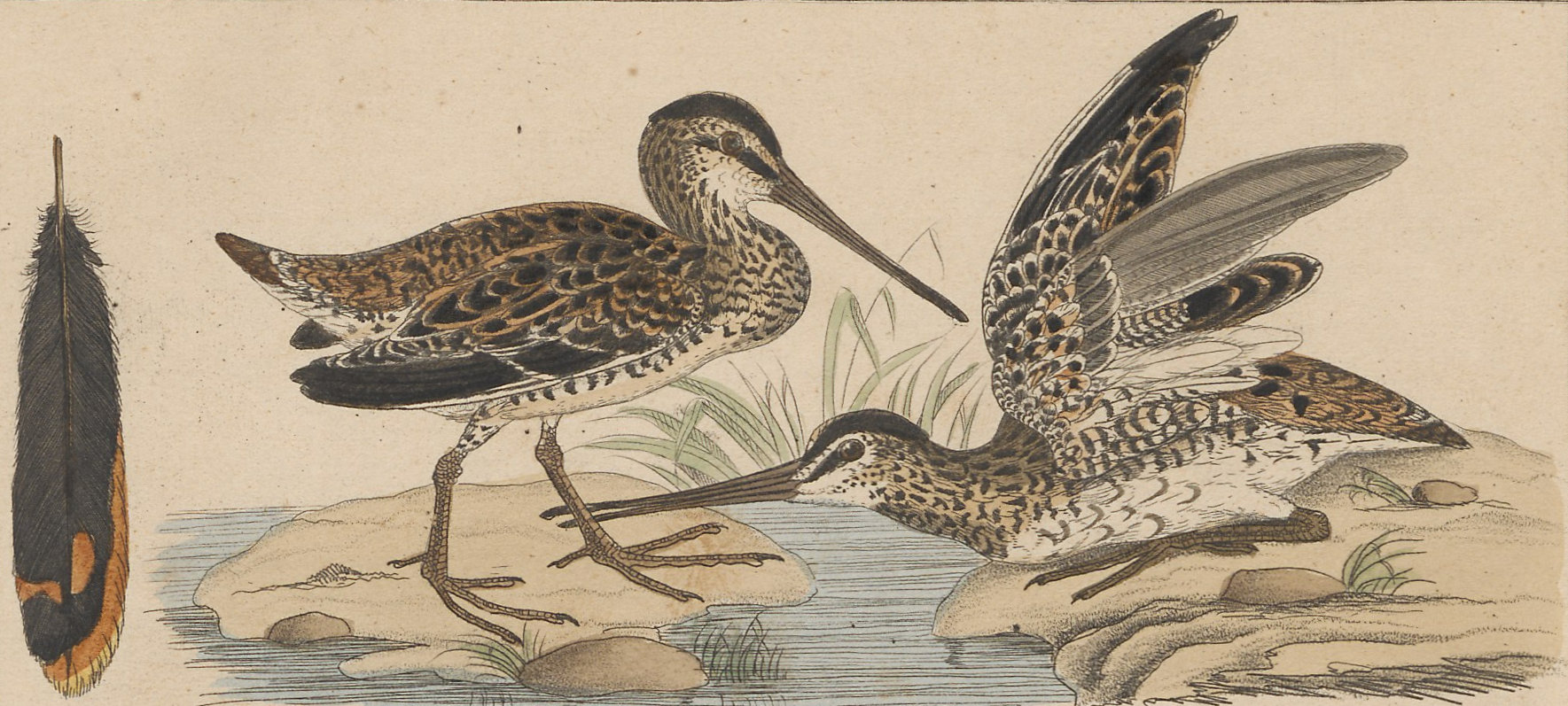
19th century print of the species

The Madagascar snipe breeds in marshes, swamps, muddy areas, flooded fields and sometimes ricefields. It builds a saucer-shaped nest of dry grass in the drier areas of its breeding wetland. The nest is concealed in a dense tuft of grass or sedges. Breeding occurs from at least July to January.

This bird has a spectacular aerial display, which involves flying high in circles, followed by a powerful stoop during which the bird makes a drumming sound, caused by vibrations of modified outer tail feathers.

The Madagascar snipe forages by pushing its long bill deep into the mud seeking invertebrates, such as insects and worms, seeds and plants. If alarmed, it freezes, and its cryptic plumage provides effective camouflage when the bird stands motionless amongst marsh vegetation. When flushed, it flies off with a zigzagging action.

== Conservation status ==
This bird is uncommon, with the total population estimated between 2,500 – 9,999 mature individuals as of 2021. It is found in small groups of 4–8.

The species is threatened by the increasing conversion of wetland-edge habitat to rice cultivation. For example, at the largest block of suitable wetland habitat in Madagascar, Lake Alaotra, 250 km^{2} (97 sq mi) of the 350 km^{2} (135 sq mi) surrounding the lake are now under rice production. The species is also threatened by hunting for food, for subsistence use or local trade.
