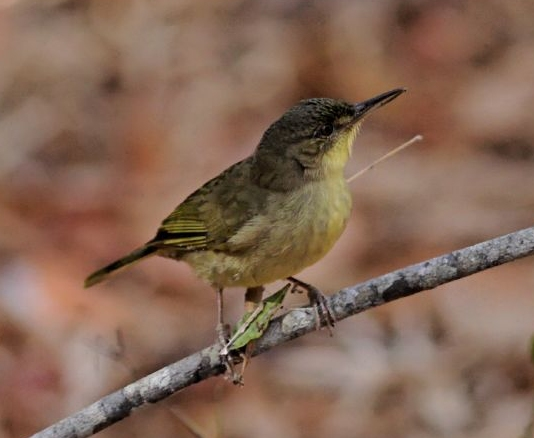
- The long-billed bernieria (Bernieria madagascariensis) was formerly placed in the Pycnonotidae

Scientific classification
- Kingdom: Animalia
- Phylum: Chordata
- Class: Aves
- Order: Passeriformes
- Superfamily: Locustelloidea
- Family: Bernieridae; Cibois, David, Gregory & Pasquet, 2010

Genera
- see text

= Bernieridae =

Madagascan warblers

Family of birds

The tetrakas, also known as the Malagasy warblers, are a recently validated family of songbirds. They were formally named Bernieridae in 2010. The family currently consists of eleven species (in eight genera) of small forest birds. These birds are all endemic to Madagascar.

In 1934, the monophyly of this group was proposed by Finn Salomonsen but the traditional assignments of these birds were maintained, mistaken by their convergent evolution and the lack of dedicated research. The families to which the Malagasy warblers were formerly assigned—Pycnonotidae and even more so Timaliidae and Sylviidae—were used as "wastebin taxa", uniting unrelated lineages that were somewhat similar ecologically and morphologically.

It was not until the analysis of mtDNA cytochrome b and 16S rRNA as well as nDNA RAG-1 and RAG-2 exon sequence data, that the long-proposed grouping was accepted.

== Taxonomy and systematics ==
The family contains 11 species divided into 8 genera.

Image	Genus	Species
	Oxylabes Sharpe, 1870	Oxylabes madagascariensis – White-throated oxylabes
	Bernieria Pucheran, 1855	Bernieria madagascariensis – Long-billed bernieria
	Cryptosylvicola Goodman, Langrand & Whitney, 1996	Cryptosylvicola randrianasoloi – Cryptic warbler
	Hartertula Stresemann, 1925	Hartertula flavoviridis – Wedge-tailed jery
	Thamnornis Milne-Edwards & Grandidier, 1882	Thamnornis chloropetoides – Thamnornis
	Xanthomixis Sharpe, 1881	Appert's tetraka, Xanthomixis apperti; Grey-crowned tetraka, Xanthomixis cinereiceps; Spectacled tetraka, Xanthomixis zosterops
	Crossleyia Hartlaub, 1877	Crossleyia xanthophrys – Madagascar yellowbrow; Crossleyia tenebrosa – Dusky tetraka
	Randia Delacour & Berlioz, 1931	Randia pseudozosterops – Rand's warbler

The first phylogeny of the Bernieridae to include all eleven recognized species was performed by Younger et al. 2019:

- Bernieridae
  - Xanthomixis
    - - X. zosterops
      - - X. cinereiceps
        - X. apperti
    - - X. tenebrosa
      - Crossleyia xanthophrys
  - - - Cryptosylvicola randrianasoloi
      - - Oxylabes madagascariensis
        - Bernieria
          - B. sp.
          - - B. inceleber
            - B. madagascariensis
    - - - Thamnornis chloropetoides
        - Randia pseudozosterops
      - Hartertula flavoviridis

Notably, this phylogeny suggests that the genus Xanthomixis is paraphyletic, with X. tenebrosa more closely related to Crossleyia xanthophrys than to the other members of Xanthomixis. Additionally, Bernieria madagascariensis appears to be composed of three deeply diverging lineages, which may each deserve species status. However, official taxonomic descriptions of these discoveries are yet to be published.

Several Bernierids are very poorly known and were described by science only very recently. Appert's tetraka was only described in 1972 and the cryptic warbler in 1996. The Appert's tetraka, along with the dusky tetraka are threatened by habitat loss, and are listed as vulnerable.

Most members of this family live in the humid rainforests in the east of Madagascar, though a few species are found in the drier southwest of the island. They feed on insects and will form mixed-species feeding flocks of up to six species while foraging. Additionally, Bernierid species are the only known hosts for the feather mite genus Bernierinyssus.
