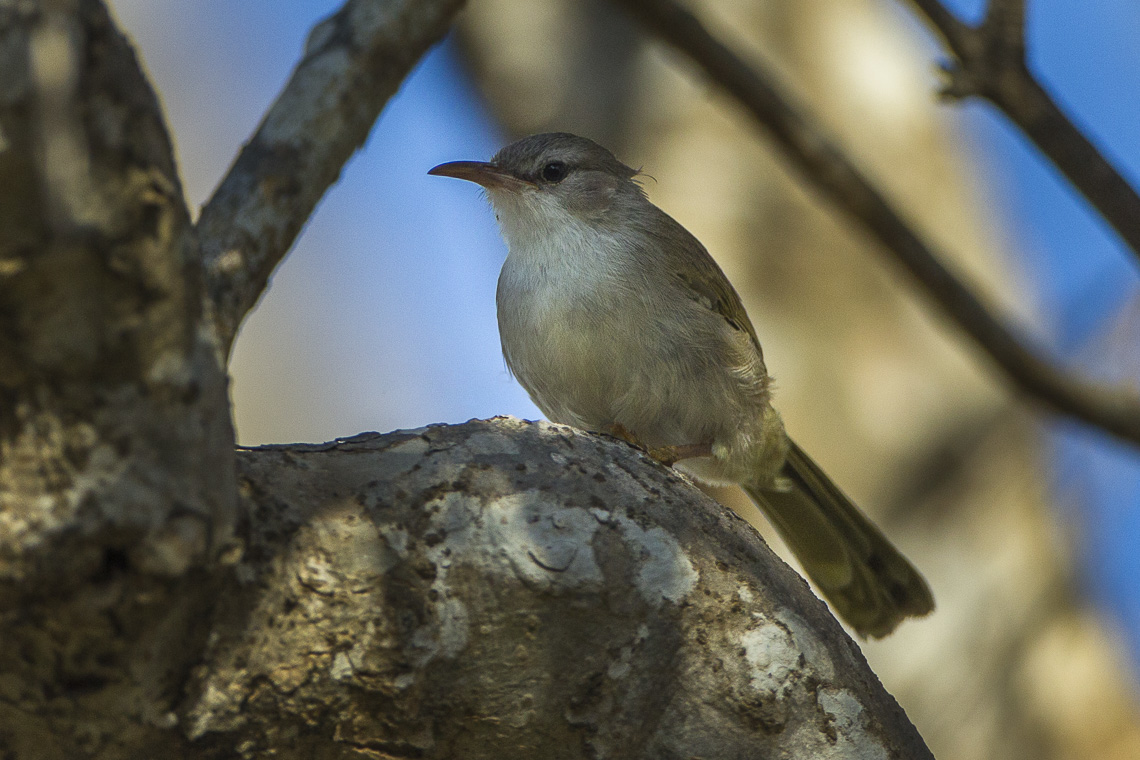

Conservation status
- Least Concern (IUCN 3.1)

Scientific classification
- Kingdom: Animalia
- Phylum: Chordata
- Class: Aves
- Order: Passeriformes
- Family: Bernieridae
- Genus: Thamnornis; Milne-Edwards & Grandidier, 1882
- Species: T. chloropetoides

Binomial name
- Thamnornis chloropetoides (Grandidier, 1867)

= Thamnornis =

Species of bird

The thamnornis or thamnornis warbler (Thamnornis chloropetoides) is a species of Malagasy warbler in the family Bernieridae. It is endemic to Madagascar, where it is restricted to the spiny forest of the island's southwest. It is greyish above and whitish below, with narrow green fringes to the wing feathers and a marked supercilium. The outer tail-feathers have pale tips.

Its natural habitats are subtropical or tropical dry forests and subtropical or tropical dry shrubland. It is usually seen near the ground, but sings from tall trees. It often associates in family groups or with Newtonias in mixed-species flocks. While not considered threatened, its population is inferred to be decreasing due to widespread deforestation across its range.

A 2019 phylogenetic study found the Thamnornis to be the sister species of Rand's warbler.
