= Red-tailed newtonia =

Conservation status
- Vulnerable (IUCN 3.1)

Scientific classification
- Kingdom: Animalia
- Phylum: Chordata
- Class: Aves
- Order: Passeriformes
- Family: Vangidae
- Genus: Newtonia
- Species: N. fanovanae

Binomial name
- Newtonia fanovanae Gyldenstolpe, 1933

Species of bird

The red-tailed newtonia (Newtonia fanovanae) is a species of bird in the family Vangidae. It is endemic to Madagascar.

Its natural habitat is subtropical or tropical moist lowland forests. It is threatened by habitat loss.
