= Dusky tetraka =

Conservation status
- Data Deficient (IUCN 3.1)

Scientific classification
- Kingdom: Animalia
- Phylum: Chordata
- Class: Aves
- Order: Passeriformes
- Family: Bernieridae
- Genus: Crossleyia
- Species: C. tenebrosa

Binomial name
- Crossleyia tenebrosa (Stresemann, 1925)

Synonyms
- Phyllastrephus tenebrosus (Stresemann, 1925)

Species of bird

The dusky tetraka (Crossleyia tenebrosa) is a species of Old World warbler in the family Bernieridae. It is found only in Madagascar. Its natural habitat is subtropical or tropical moist lowland forests. It is threatened by habitat loss.

In 2023, three individuals were discovered in northern Madagascar after it was assumed that the species had gone extinct due to threats to its habitat. Before then it was last seen in 1999. It is one of the ten most endangered bird species in the world.

The dusky tetraka was formerly placed in the genus Xanthomixis. It was moved to the genus Crossleyia based on a molecular genetic study published online in 2019.
