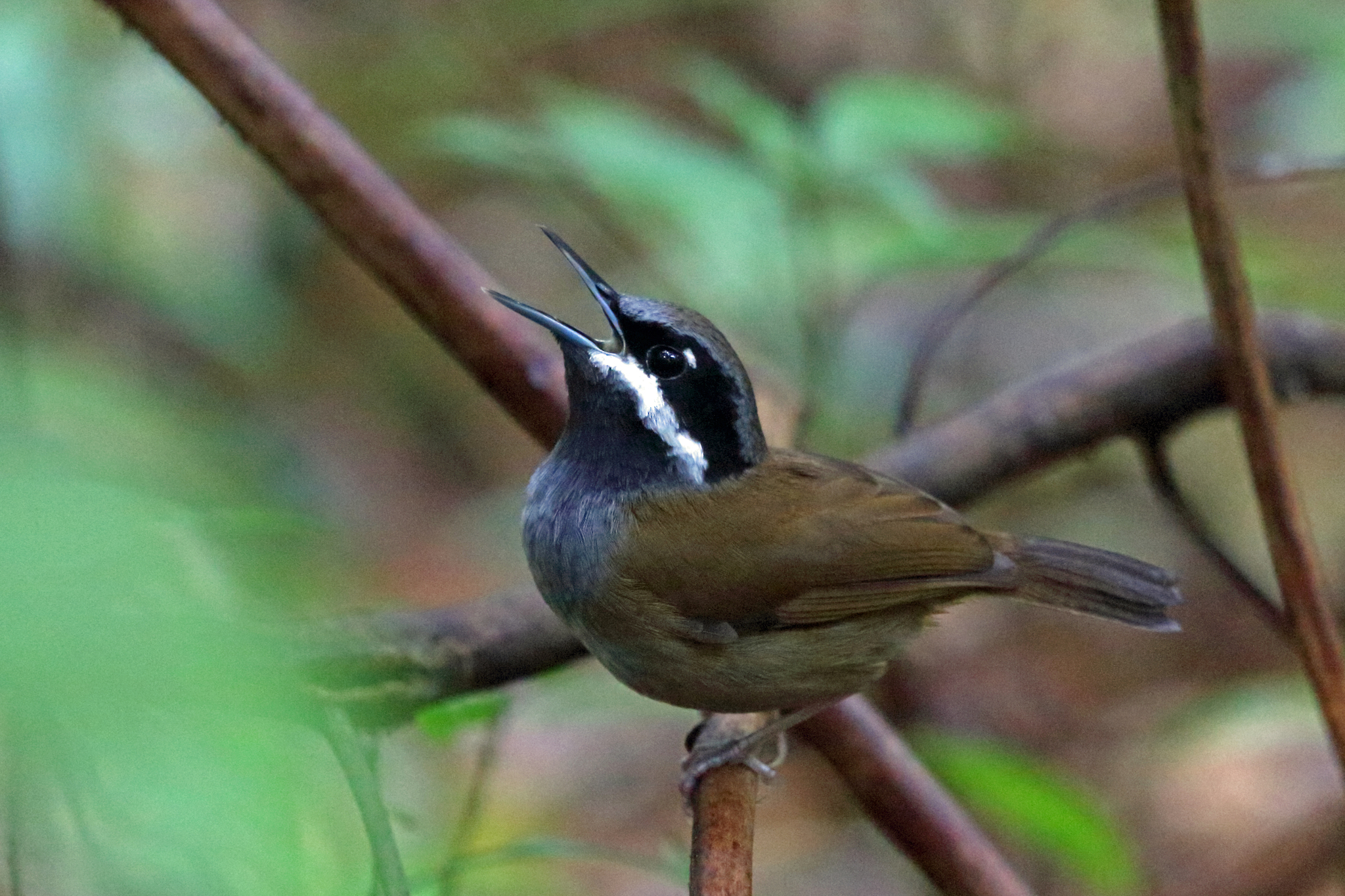

Conservation status
- Least Concern (IUCN 3.1)

Scientific classification
- Kingdom: Animalia
- Phylum: Chordata
- Class: Aves
- Order: Passeriformes
- Family: Vangidae
- Genus: Mystacornis; Sharpe, 1870
- Species: M. crossleyi

Binomial name
- Mystacornis crossleyi (Grandidier, 1870)

= Crossley's vanga =

Species of bird

Crossley's vanga (Mystacornis crossleyi), also known as Crossley's babbler-vanga, Crossley's babbler, Madagascar groundhunter, or Madagascar groundjumper, is a bird species in the family Vangidae. It is named after the specimen collector Alfred Crossley.

== Taxonomy ==
The bird is in the monotypic genus Mystacornis. The species is an example of convergent evolution: its bill and body shape adapted to its habit of looking for insect prey in the leaf litter, eventually becoming so similar to that of ground-babblers that early naturalists initially classified the Crossley's vanga into what was then known as the babbler family, Timaliidae.

== Description ==
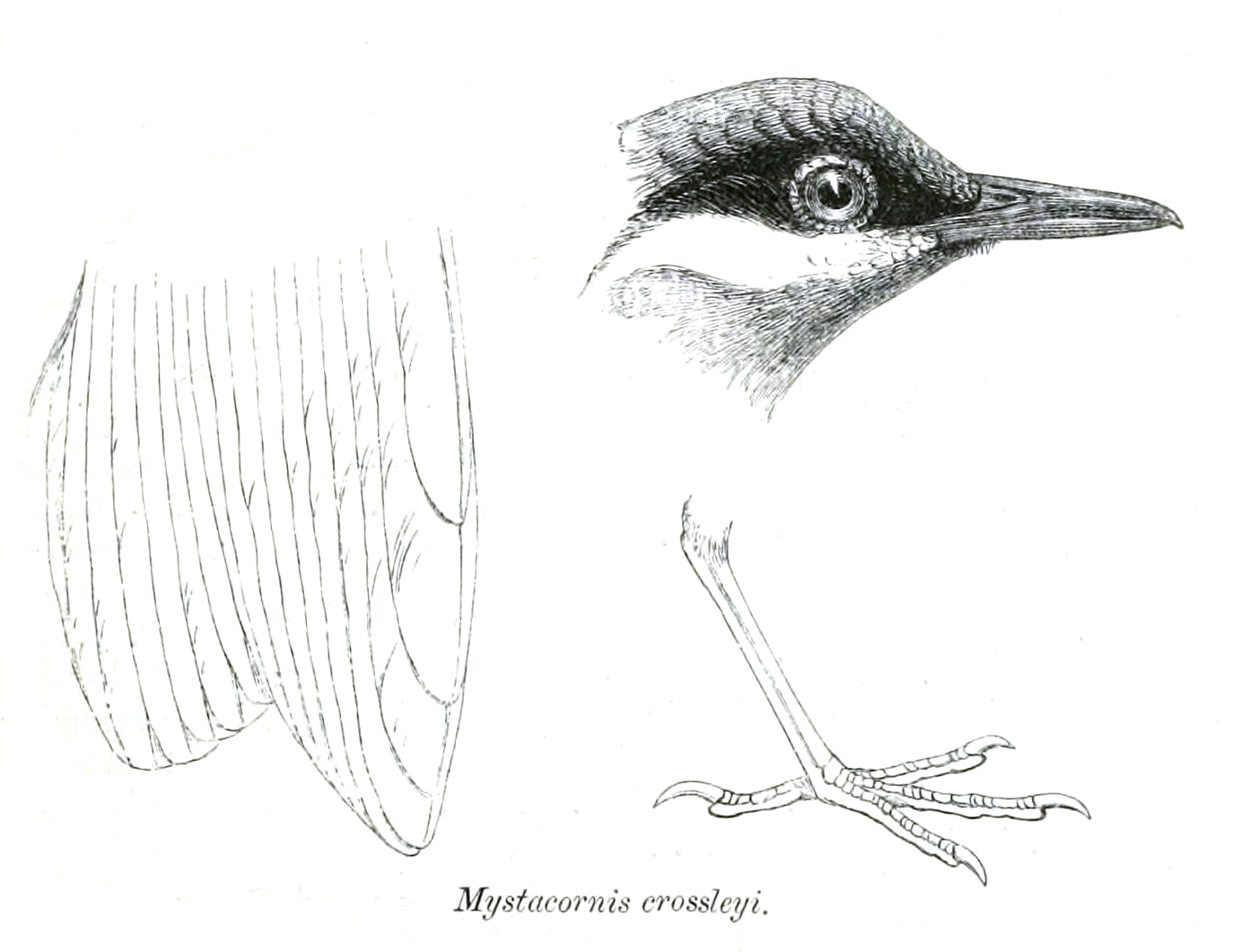
Details of morphology

Crossley's vanga is a small babbler-like bird, 15 cm long and weighing around 25 g. Its most distinctive feature is the olive-grey bill, which is disproportionately long and slightly hooked at the end. The plumage of the male is olive green on the crown, back, wings, tail and flanks, a grey belly, black throat and face, with a white submoustachial stripe and grey stripe above the eye. The legs are grey and the iris black. The female is similar but with a white throat and belly.

== Behaviour ==
=== Breeding ===
The breeding season for this species is from August to November. The male builds a shallow cup nest of twigs and rootlets in a tree or other vegetation around 1.5 m off the ground. Two to three eggs are laid and incubated by both sexes.

=== Feeding ===
It forages singly or in pairs. It is a terrestrial bird that feeds on the ground on spiders, cockroaches, earwigs, true bugs, grasshoppers and ants. It rarely flies but instead walks and runs and probing its bill into leaf-litter, mosses, and soil.

== Distribution and habitat ==
Crossley's vanga is endemic to Madagascar. It is distributed in the east of Madagascar in broadleaf forest, from sea level up to 1800 m.
