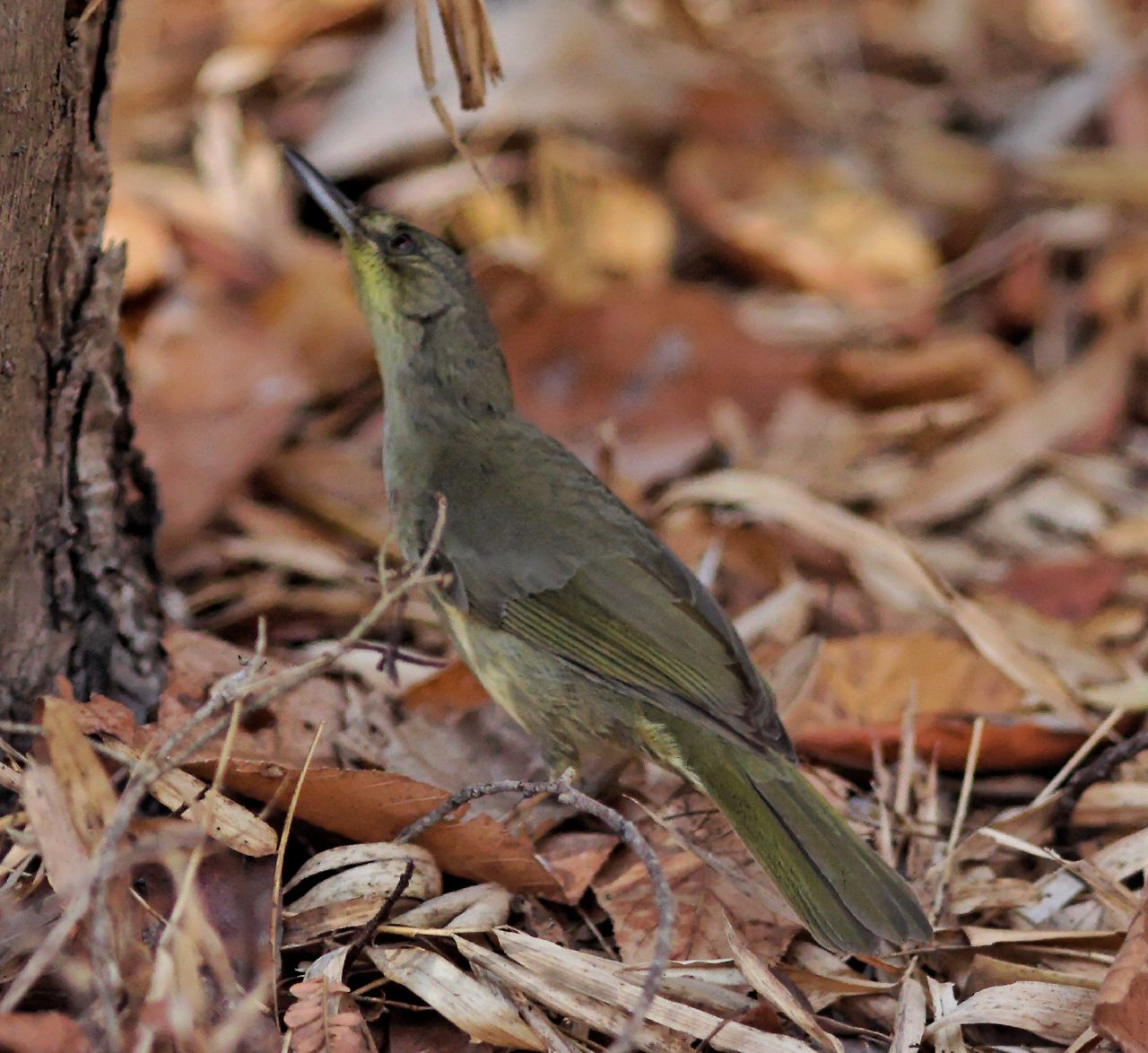

Conservation status
- Least Concern (IUCN 3.1)

Scientific classification
- Kingdom: Animalia
- Phylum: Chordata
- Class: Aves
- Order: Passeriformes
- Family: Bernieridae
- Genus: Bernieria; Pucheran, 1855
- Species: B. madagascariensis

Binomial name
- Bernieria madagascariensis (Gmelin, JF, 1789)

Synonyms
- Phyllastrephus madagascariensis

= Long-billed bernieria =

Species of bird

The long-billed bernieria (Bernieria madagascariensis), formerly known as long-billed greenbul and sometimes as common tetraka or long-billed tetraka, is a songbird species endemic to Madagascar. It is the only species placed in the genus Bernieria. Its natural habitat is subtropical or tropical moist lowland forests.

== Taxonomy ==
In 1760 the French zoologist Mathurin Jacques Brisson included a description and an illustration of the long-billed bernieria in the third volume of his Ornithologie based on a specimen collected on the island of Madagascar. He used the French name Le grand figuier de Madagascar and the Latin name Ficedula Madagascariensis Major. Although Brisson coined Latin names, these do not conform to the binomial system and are not recognised by the International Commission on Zoological Nomenclature. When in 1789 the German naturalist Johann Friedrich Gmelin revised and expanded Carl Linnaeus's Systema Naturae he included the long-billed bernieria based on Brisson's description. He placed it with the flycatchers in the genus Muscicapa and coined the binomial name Muscicapa madagascariensis. The long-billed bernieria is now the only species placed in the genus Bernieria that was erected in 1855 by the French zoologist Jacques Pucheran. The genus name honours the French surgeon-naturalist Chevalier J. A. Bernier who resided in Madagascar from 1831 to 1834.

Two subspecies are recognised.

- B. m. madagascariensis (Gmelin, JF, 1789) – east Madagascar
- B. m. incelebris Bangs & Peters, JL, 1926 – north, west Madagascar

It was initially considered a greenbul, and later with the Old World warblers. Recent research indicates it is part of the endemic Malagasy radiation Bernieridae (Malagasy warblers). Its presumed relatives are not as closely related as was once believed and have been restored to the old genus Xanthomixis.

== Description ==
The long-billed bernieria is a slender species with an overall length of 17.5–20 cm (6.9–7.9 in). The top of the head, the upperparts and the tail are brownish green, the underparts are mainly yellow. The bill is long and thin; the upper mandible has a small terminal hook.
