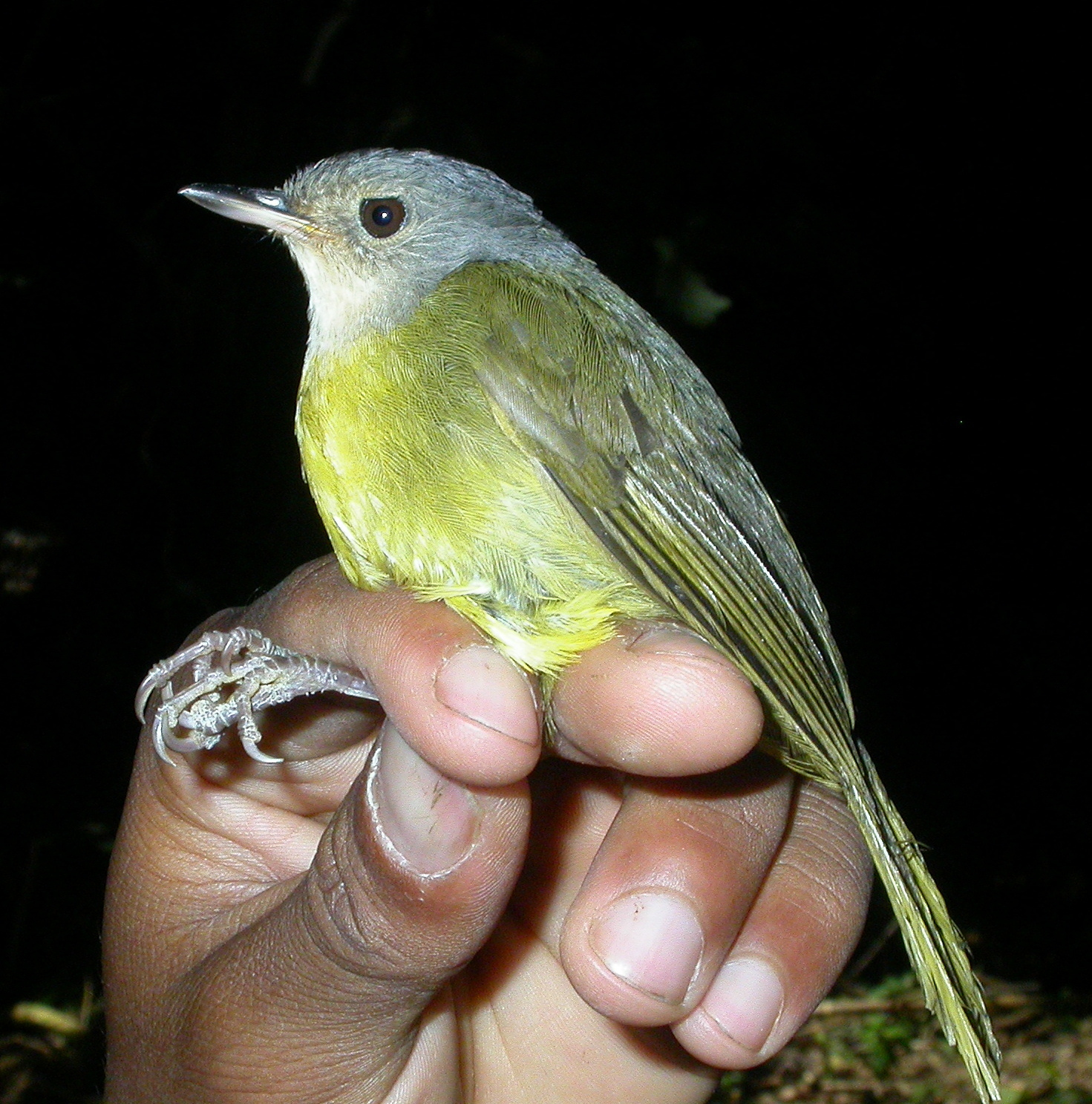

Conservation status
- Near Threatened (IUCN 3.1)

Scientific classification
- Kingdom: Animalia
- Phylum: Chordata
- Class: Aves
- Order: Passeriformes
- Family: Bernieridae
- Genus: Xanthomixis
- Species: X. cinereiceps

Binomial name
- Xanthomixis cinereiceps (Sharpe, 1881)
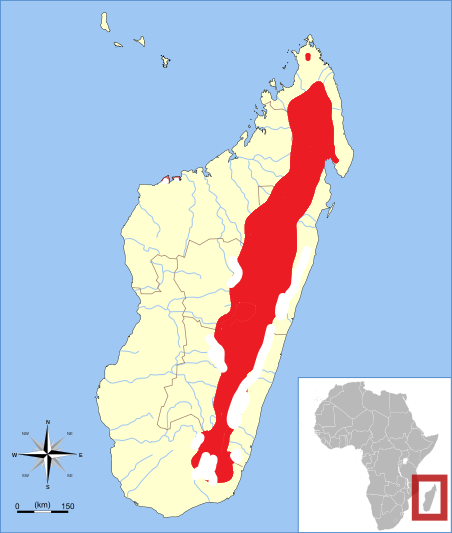
- Range map of Xanthomixis cinereiceps in Madagascar

Synonyms
- Phyllastrephus cinereiceps (Sharpe, 1881); Bernieria cinereiceps

= Grey-crowned tetraka =

Species of bird

The grey-crowned tetraka (Xanthomixis cinereiceps), formerly known as the grey-crowned greenbul, is a species of Malagasy warbler in the family Bernieridae. It is found only in eastern and northern Madagascar.

== Description ==
The bird is slender, with a green back, pale grey crown and ear coverts, a white throat, yellow underparts, and grey legs. The slim bill is pale pink with a darker culmen.

== Habitat and range ==
Its natural habitat is primary humid montane forests along the length of eastern Madagascar. It ranges from 900 to 2000 meters elevation, and is most common in higher-elevation forests at 1,400 to 1,800 meters. It is seldom found in disturbed forests or drier forests in the mountains' rain shadow.

It feeds on small insects on mossy tree trunks and sometimes on understory shrubs, but is seldom observed on the ground. It is often found in multi-species flocks.

It is threatened by habitat loss.

== Breeding ==
Birds have been observed nesting in November, and juveniles observed in November and December. Nests are bowl-shaped and made of moss lined with dry grass and palm fibers, built in horizontal branch forks one to two meters above the ground. Females generally lay three eggs per season. Observations suggest it is a cooperative feeder.
