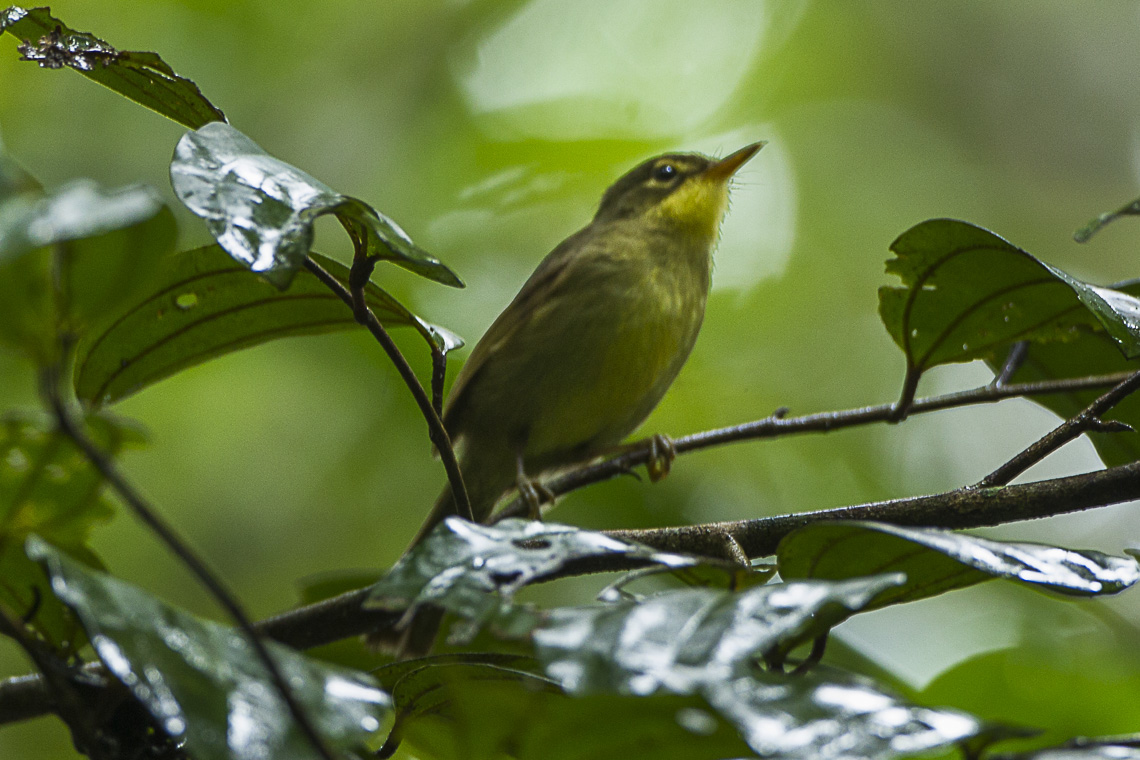

Conservation status
- Least Concern (IUCN 3.1)

Scientific classification
- Kingdom: Animalia
- Phylum: Chordata
- Class: Aves
- Order: Passeriformes
- Family: Bernieridae
- Genus: Xanthomixis
- Species: X. zosterops

Binomial name
- Xanthomixis zosterops (Sharpe, 1875)

= Spectacled tetraka =

Species of bird

The spectacled tetraka (Xanthomixis zosterops) is a species of Malagasy warbler in the family Bernieridae. It is found only in Madagascar. Its natural habitat is subtropical or tropical moist lowland forests.
