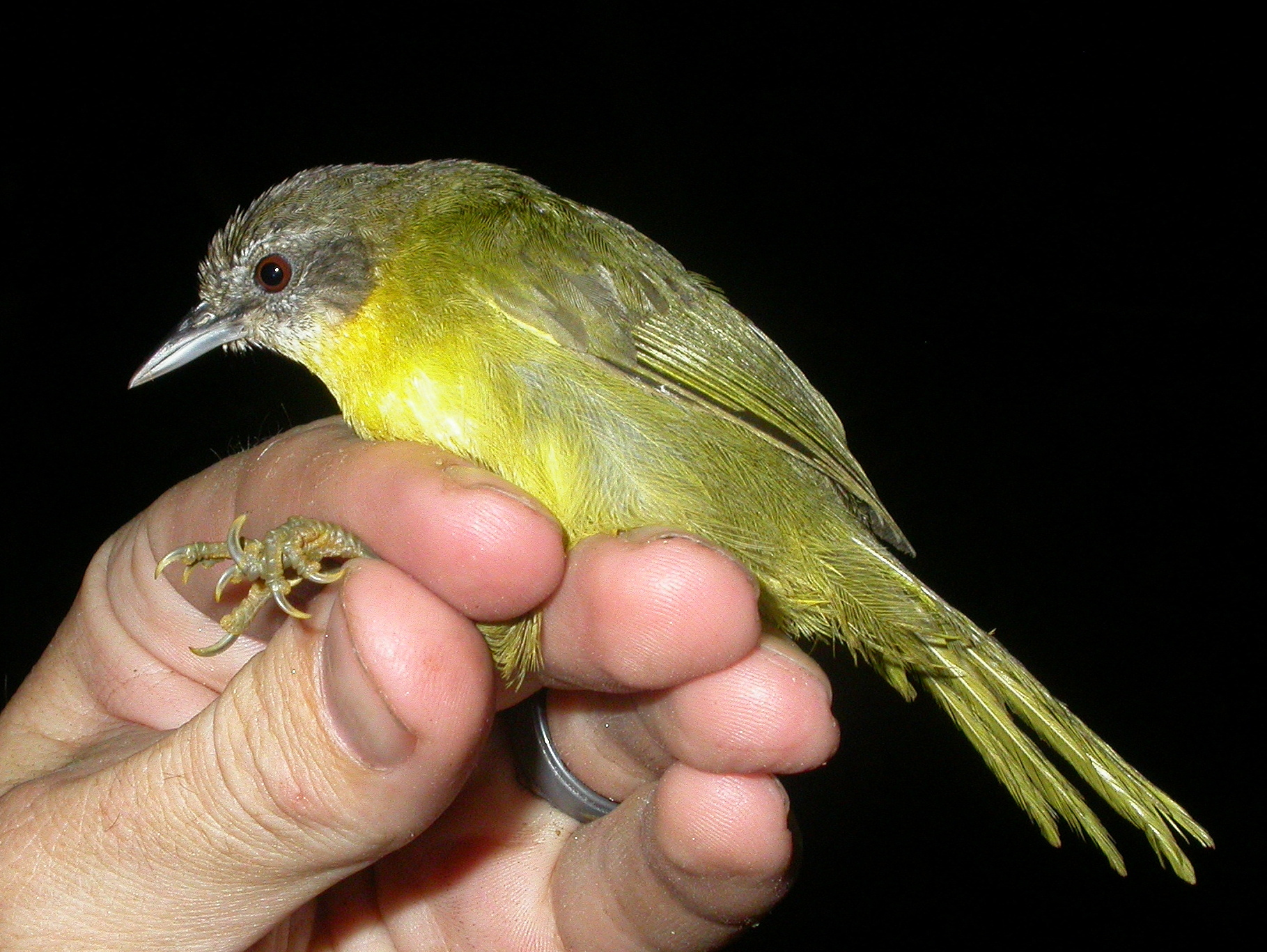

Conservation status
- Near Threatened (IUCN 3.1)

Scientific classification
- Kingdom: Animalia
- Phylum: Chordata
- Class: Aves
- Order: Passeriformes
- Family: Bernieridae
- Genus: Hartertula; Stresemann, 1925
- Species: H. flavoviridis

Binomial name
- Hartertula flavoviridis (Hartert, EJO, 1924)

Synonyms
- Neomixis flavoviridis

= Wedge-tailed jery =

Species of bird

The wedge-tailed jery (Hartertula flavoviridis) is a small bird endemic to the east of Madagascar. The species has been the cause of some taxonomic confusion, it was originally placed with the jeries in the genus Neomixis (Cisticolidae) before being placed in its own monotypic genus Hartertula, but still considered close to Neomixis. Recent research indicates it is part of an endemic Malagasy radiation currently known as the Malagasy warblers (Cibois et al. 2001).

== Description ==
The wedge-tailed jery is a small, slender warbler-like bird between 12–13 cm long and weighing around 10 g. The plumage is bright yellow before and olive on the crown, wing and back. The eye has a pale white ring and is crossed with a pale supercilium. There is no sexual dimorphism in the plumage of adults, and juvenile birds have similar plumage as well.

== Ecology and behaviour ==
The call, sung repetitively during foraging, is a nasal tsee zeezeezeezeezeezee. In the rainforest they forage in the low understory, gleaning insects from the undersides of leaves and branches, often hanging upside down to do so. They are also accomplished at extracting insects from clumps of leaves and spider web at the ends of branches. They forage in small groups and will also join mixed-species feeding flocks. They nest in small grass nests shaped like balls suspended between 1–2 m above the ground. Little is known about their breeding behaviour but they are known to have clutch sizes of two eggs.

== Distribution and habitat ==
Wedge-tailed jeries inhabit dense stands of rainforest in the east of Madagascar. They are most commonly found in the mid-altitude rainforests between 500–1400 m, and are rarer at lower altitudes and absent above 2300 m.

The wedge-tailed jery is currently listed as near-threatened by the IUCN. The species is confined to mid-altitude rainforest, but this is currently the least threatened forest habitat in Madagascar. There is some danger of habitat loss, and the species is not common anywhere in its range.
