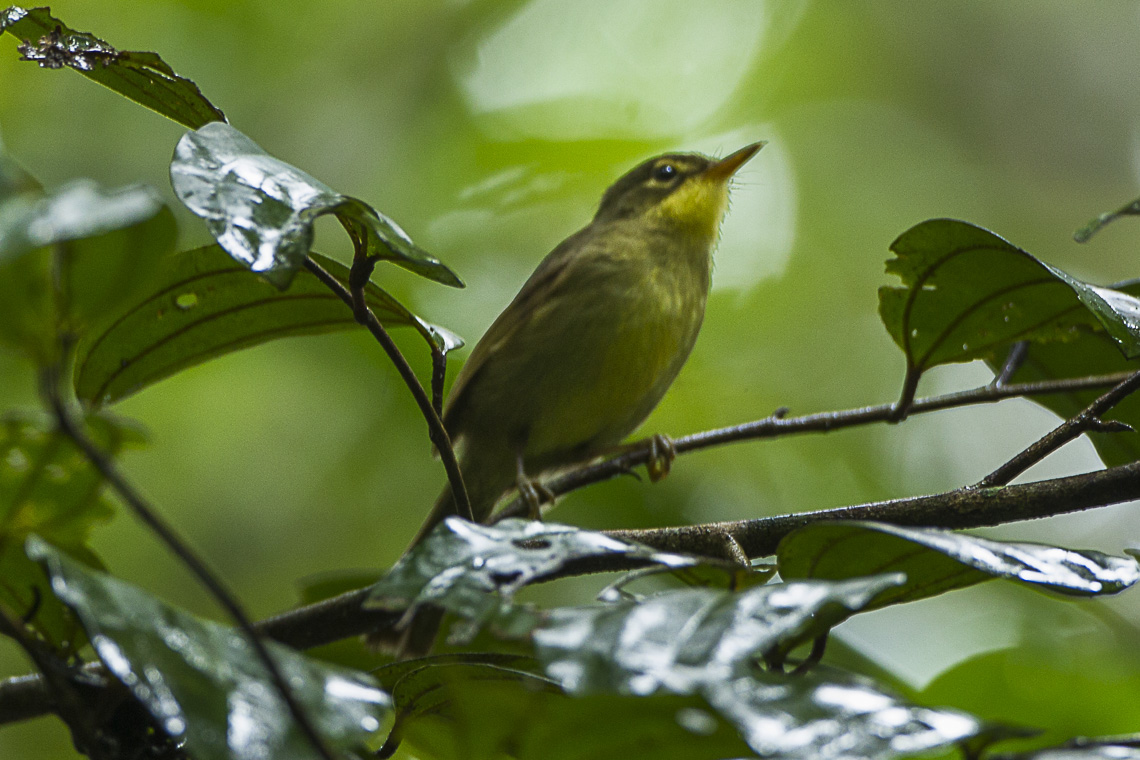
- Spectacled tetraka (Xanthomixis zosterops)

Scientific classification
- Kingdom: Animalia
- Phylum: Chordata
- Class: Aves
- Order: Passeriformes
- Family: Bernieridae
- Genus: Xanthomixis; Sharpe, 1881

Type species
- Bernieria zosterops Sharpe, 1875

= Xanthomixis =

Genus of birds

Xanthomixis is a genus of birds in the Malagasy warbler family, Bernieridae. It contains the tetrakas.

== Species ==
The genus contains three species:

Image	Common name	Scientific name	Distribution
	Appert's tetraka	Xanthomixis apperti	south-west of Madagascar.
	Grey-crowned tetraka	Xanthomixis cinereiceps	eastern and northern Madagascar.
	Spectacled tetraka	Xanthomixis zosterops	Madagascar.
