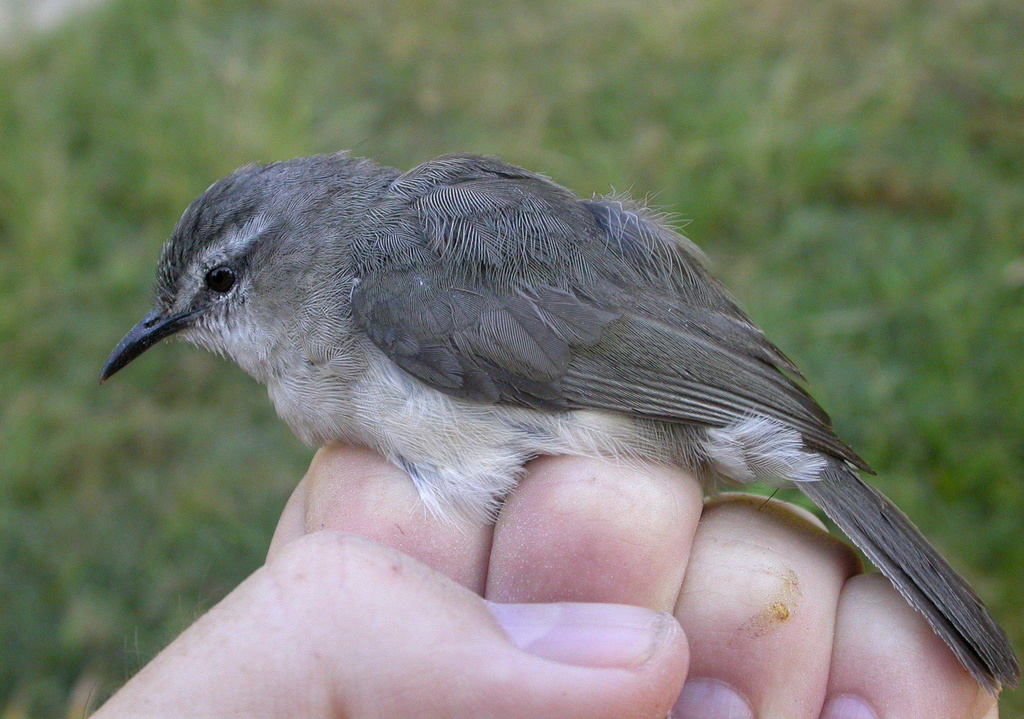

Conservation status
- Least Concern (IUCN 3.1)

Scientific classification
- Kingdom: Animalia
- Phylum: Chordata
- Class: Aves
- Order: Passeriformes
- Family: Bernieridae
- Genus: Randia; Delacour & Berlioz, 1931
- Species: R. pseudozosterops

Binomial name
- Randia pseudozosterops Delacour & Berlioz, 1931

= Rand's warbler =

Species of bird

Rand's warbler (Randia pseudozosterops) is a species in the family Bernieridae. It is found only in Madagascar, where it is restricted to the island's eastern rainforests. It is grey above and unmarked pale below, with a strong pale supercilium. The bill is strong and slightly decurved, with some individuals possessing a pale orange lower mandible.

Its natural habitat is subtropical or tropical moist lowland forests, where it is fairly common up to 1200 m. It frequently joins mixed-species flocks, where it often feeds along horizontal or angled branches. It also tends to sing for long periods from the canopy. While not considered threatened, its population is inferred to be decreasing due to widespread deforestation across its range.

A 2019 phylogenetic study found Rand's warbler to be the sister species of the Thamnornis.
