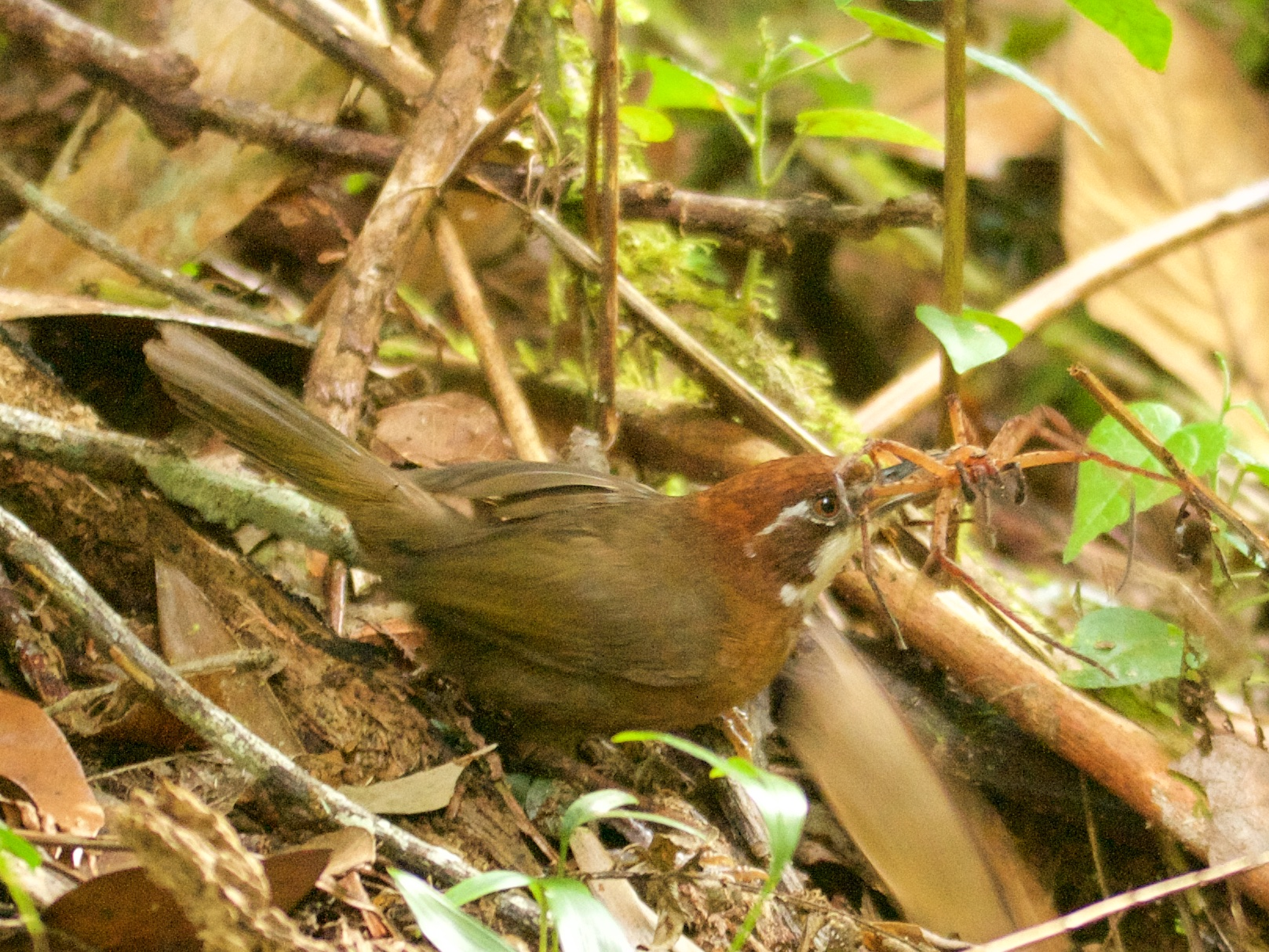

Conservation status
- Least Concern (IUCN 3.1)

Scientific classification
- Kingdom: Animalia
- Phylum: Chordata
- Class: Aves
- Order: Passeriformes
- Family: Bernieridae
- Genus: Oxylabes; Sharpe, 1870
- Species: O. madagascariensis

Binomial name
- Oxylabes madagascariensis (Gmelin, JF, 1789)

Synonyms
- Hypositta perdita

= White-throated oxylabes =

Species of bird

The white-throated oxylabes (Oxylabes madagascariensis) is a species of passerine bird that is endemic to Madagascar. It is the only species placed in the genus Oxylabes. Formerly considered as a member of the Old World warbler family Sylviidae, it has been moved to the family Bernieridae — the Malagasy warblers. Its natural habitat is subtropical or tropical moist lowland forests.

== Taxonomy ==
In 1760 the French zoologist Mathurin Jacques Brisson included a description and an illustration of the white-throated oxylabes in the third volume of his Ornithologie based on a specimen collected on the island of Madagascar. He used the French name Le rossignol de Madagascar and the Latin name Luscinia madagascariensis. Although Brisson coined Latin names, these do not conform to the binomial system and are not recognised by the International Commission on Zoological Nomenclature. When in 1789 the German naturalist Johann Friedrich Gmelin revised and expanded Carl Linnaeus's Systema Naturae he included the white-throated oxylabes based on Brisson's description. He placed it with the wagtails in the genus Motacilla and coined the binomial name Motacilla madagascariensis. The white-throated oxylabes is now the only species placed in the genus Oxylabes that was introduced in 1870 by the English ornithologist Richard Bowdler Sharpe. The genus name is from Ancient Greek oxulabēs meaning "quick at seizing". The species is monotypic: no subspecies are recognised.

In 2013, genetic studies determined that the Bluntschli's vanga (also known as short-toed nuthatch-vanga), a species described in 1996 from two specimens collected in 1931, was actually this species. The specimens were both juveniles in a poorly known brown plumage.

== Description ==
The white-throated oxylabes is a large warbler 17–18 cm (6.7–7.1 in) in length. It has short wings, long legs and a long stout bill. The upperparts are dark olive-brown with a rufous top and side of head. It has a narrow white supercilium and a white chin and throat. The underparts are dark brown. The sexes are alike.
