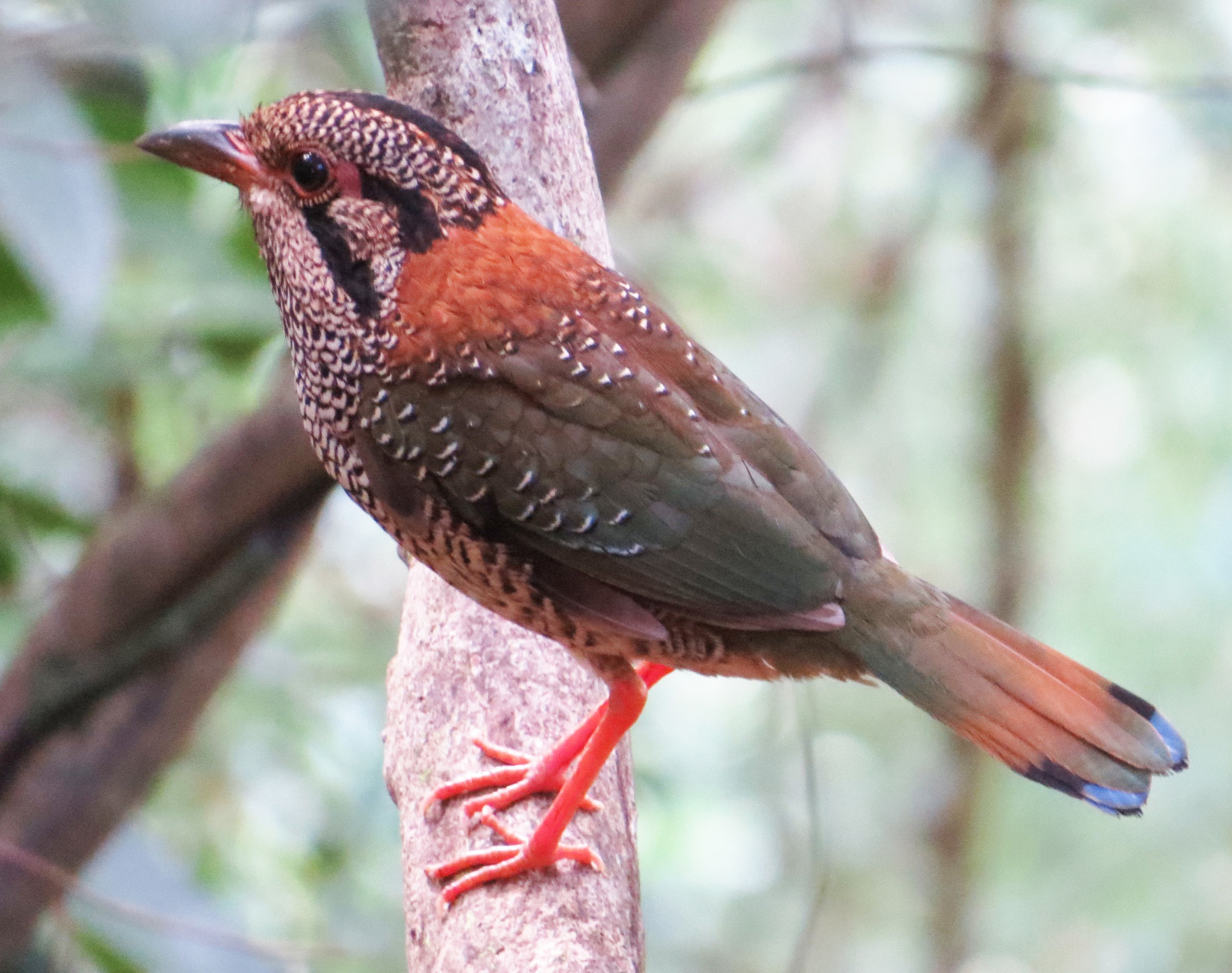

Conservation status
- Vulnerable (IUCN 3.1)

Scientific classification
- Kingdom: Animalia
- Phylum: Chordata
- Class: Aves
- Order: Coraciiformes
- Family: Brachypteraciidae
- Genus: Geobiastes; Sharpe, 1871
- Species: G. squamiger

Binomial name
- Geobiastes squamiger (Lafresnaye, 1838)

Synonyms
- See text

= Scaly ground roller =

Species of bird endemic to Madagascar

The scaly ground roller (Geobiastes squamiger) is a species of bird in a monotypic genus in the family Brachypteraciidae. It is endemic to eastern Madagascar. Its natural habitat is subtropical or tropical moist lowland forest. The scaly ground roller is found at elevations below 1,000 meters (3,300 ft), and one of the few birds of Madagascar to reside in lowland rainforest.

== Morphology ==
Scaly ground rollers grow to between 27 and 31 cm (11 and 12 in). The head is covered with a black and white scaly pattern. It is a copper brown color and has green wings, with white tips. The center of the tail is reddish-brown, and has blue tips and black marks. The underside is pale, with black crescents. Its gray bill is thick and long, and its legs are pink in color.

== Ecology and behavior ==
The diet of the scaly ground roller mostly consists of invertebrates it collects from the ground but it does also eat vertebrates it can find. It has been reported to chiefly eat earthworms (Pheretima sp.) and centipedes (Scolopendra morsitons), but spiders, frogs, lizards (Zonosaurus sp. and Phelsuma sp.), and tenrecs (Microgale sp.) have also been reported to be eaten by the ground roller.

Nesting occurs in small burrows, ranging from 6.5 to 10 cm (2.6–3.9 in) wide and 55 to 77 cm (22–30 in) deep. The nests are generally found near sources of water and where there's great herbaceous ground coverage. The scaly ground roller lays its eggs from mid-October to early November, with a clutch size of one egg. Incubation is conducted solely by the female for a period of 18 days. During brooding, the female generally will remain with the egg while a male brings food to the nest. Both parents provide food for their young after hatching.

== Taxonomy ==
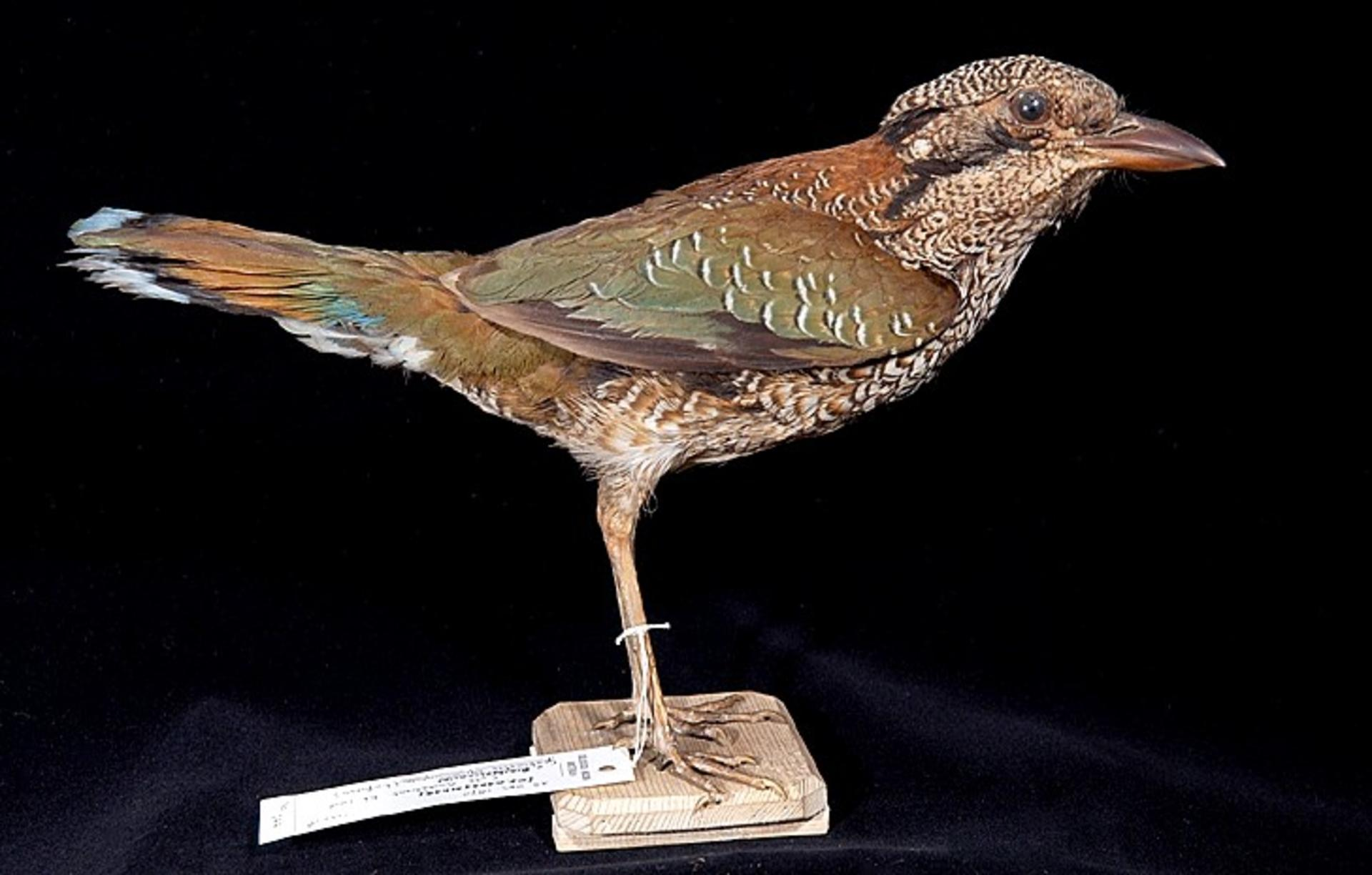
Specimen collected in April 1878 and held at Naturalis Biodiversity Center in the Netherlands.

This species taxon has been referred to by several other synonymous names until recently, including the following binomial names:

- Brachypteracias squamigera Lafresnaye, 1838
- Atelornis squamirgera Pucheran, 1846
- Geobiastes squamigerus Hartlaub, 1877

Until the 2000s, the taxon was called Brachypteracias squamigera, in the genus Brachypteracias. The scaly ground roller, Geobiastes squamiger, is in the monotypic genus Geobiastes, however was originally placed in the genus Brachypteracias in 1838 by Frédéric de Lafresnaye. The species was moved to Geobiastes to reflect its unclear phylogenetic relationship with the sister taxon to its family Brachypteraciidae, Brachypteracias leptosomus. The scaly ground roller also has a different tarsometatarsus to hallux measurement ratio compared to the genera Brachypteracias, Uratelornis, and Atelornis, where the scaly ground roller has a smaller ratio (2.8) compared to the other genera (4.5). An enlarged tarsometatarsus may be a derived character in the family Brachypteraciidae.

== Etymology ==
The generic name comes from Greek γη (gē) 'ground' and βιαστης (biastēs) 'mighty, one who uses force'. Its specific epithet "squamiger" means "scale-bearing" in Latin, deriving from Latin squama 'scale' and -gera 'carrying'.

== Conservation status ==
The scaly ground roller is threatened by habitat loss and is considered by IUCN to be a vulnerable species. Although threatened by removal of its ecological niche, it is more resilient to climate change and forest conversion effects than other similar species. Climate change can result in further loss of its habitat. It may also face risks from human hunters and domesticated dogs.
