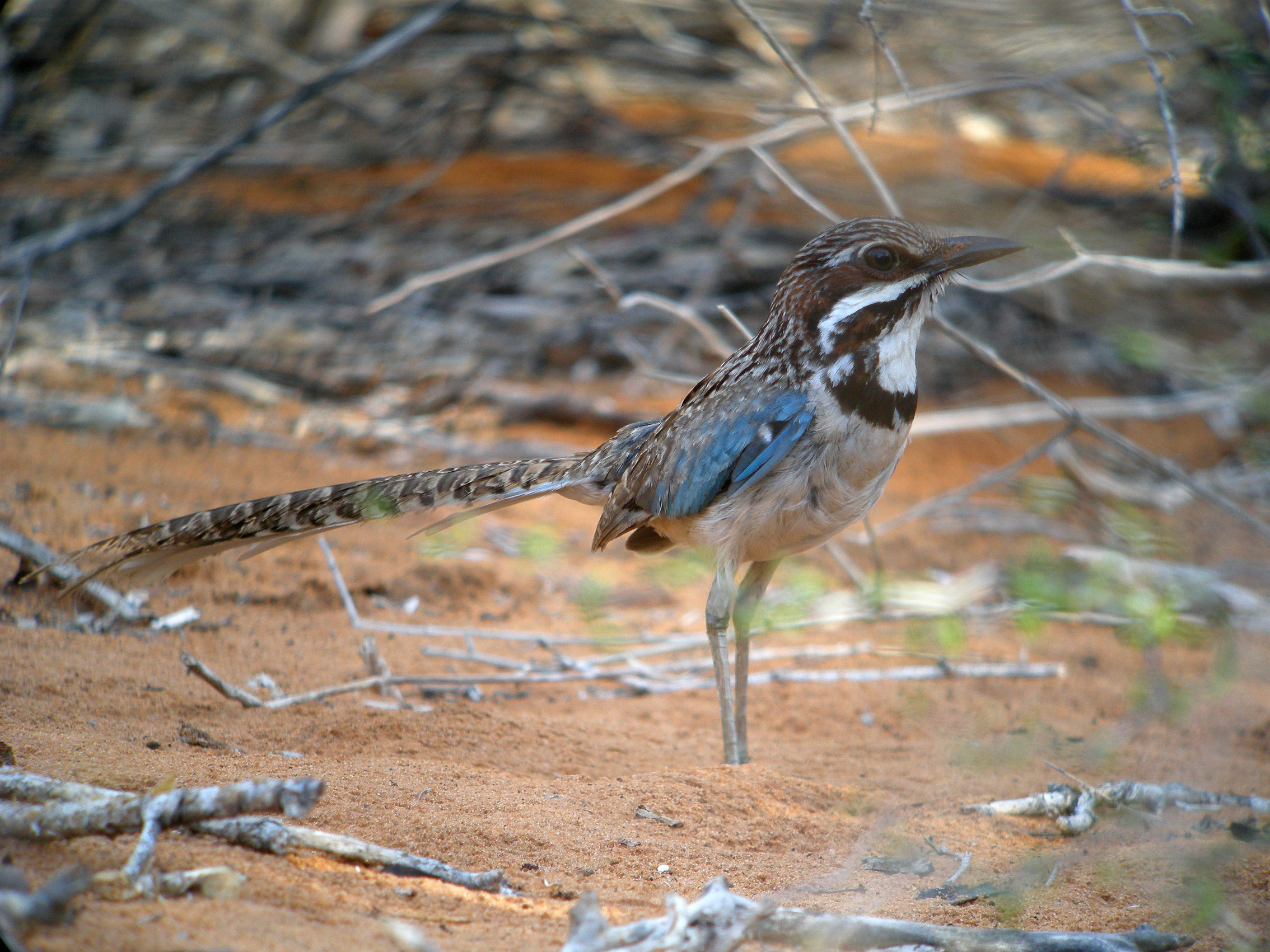
- Adult in Mangily, Madagascar

Conservation status
- Vulnerable (IUCN 3.1)

Scientific classification
- Kingdom: Animalia
- Phylum: Chordata
- Class: Aves
- Order: Coraciiformes
- Family: Brachypteraciidae
- Genus: Uratelornis; Rothschild, 1895
- Species: U. chimaera

Binomial name
- Uratelornis chimaera Rothschild, 1895
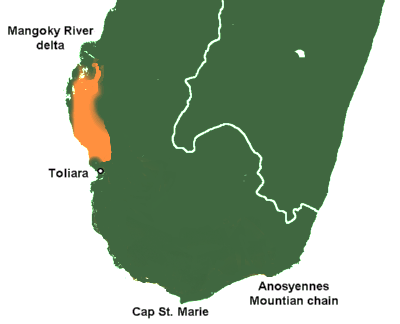
- Distribution (orange) in southern Madagascar

= Long-tailed ground roller =

Species of bird endemic to Madagascar

The long-tailed ground roller (Uratelornis chimaera) is a species of bird in the ground roller family Brachypteraciidae, placed in the monotypic genus Uratelornis. Endemic to arid spiny forests near the coast in southwestern Madagascar, this ground roller occurs at extremely low population densities throughout its habitat. This species requires shade and a deep layer of leaves on the ground, and it is absent from parts of the spiny forest lacking these features. It has no recognized subspecies, and its closest relative is the scaly ground roller. The long-tailed ground roller is the only ground roller to definitively display sexual dimorphism (differences in plumage or size between sexes). It is a medium-sized bird with a plump silhouette and a long tail. The upperparts are dark brown with black streaks while the underparts are light gray. The white throat is framed by black malar stripes and a black breastband, and a white stripe is present at the base of the bill. Sky-blue feathers are visible at the edge of the wings and the tail. Calls are rarely made outside the breeding season, though multiple courtship calls are made.

These ground rollers feed primarily on invertebrates, including ants, beetles, butterflies, and worms, which they find by searching through deep leaf litter or by remaining still and watching attentively. The ground roller primarily runs through its habitat on its strong legs, as its wings are relatively weak. It is a monogamous species, and it defends a territory during the breeding season of October to February. It digs a tunnel in the sand, at the end of which is a wider chamber where it makes its nest out of leaves and earthy pellets. Two to four eggs are laid. After the chicks fledge, the birds continue living in family groups until at least February before dispersing more widely across the scrubland.

This bird is classified as vulnerable by the IUCN and is threatened by habitat destruction. Since the arid, spiny forests in which it lives are not protected by the Malagasy government, it is losing habitat to slash-and-burn agriculture, charcoal collection, and logging. It is also hunted by the native peoples of Madagascar.

== Taxonomy ==
British banker and naturalist Walter Rothschild first described the long-tailed ground roller in 1895, giving it the scientific name Uratelornis chimaera; Rothschild published his description in Novitates Zoologicae, the periodical of his private museum. The adaptations required for the ancestral long-tailed ground roller to inhabit scrubland led Rothschild to create the monotypic genus Uratelornis for the species in his description. The genus name Uratelornis is derived from the Ancient Greek word oura "tail," and atelornis in reference to another genus of ground roller. Atelornis comes from the Ancient Greek words ateles "indeterminate or incomplete," and ornis "bird." The specific name, chimaera, is a reference to the Ancient Greek mythological creature known as the chimera. The long-tailed ground roller is placed in the ground roller family, which gets its common name due to its similarity to the rollers and its largely terrestrial nature. Until recently the ground rollers, cuckoo roller, and rollers were all placed in a single family, Coraciidae, in which each of the three groups formed a subfamily. In 1971, Joel Cracraft proposed a separate family for the ground rollers based on significant differences in behavior, plumage, and post-cranial anatomy between the groups. This position is supported by DNA evidence. It has been suggested, but not widely accepted, that ground rollers are closely related to the puffbirds and jacamars. It has been speculated that the ancestor of the long-tailed ground roller was an arboreal roller that crossed over from Africa to Madagascar and developed a terrestrial lifestyle before moving from the rainforests into the long-tailed ground roller's arid scrubland. No fossils have been found for this genus, and genetic analysis suggests that this bird's closest relative is the scaly ground roller. The long-tailed ground roller has no subspecies.

== Description ==
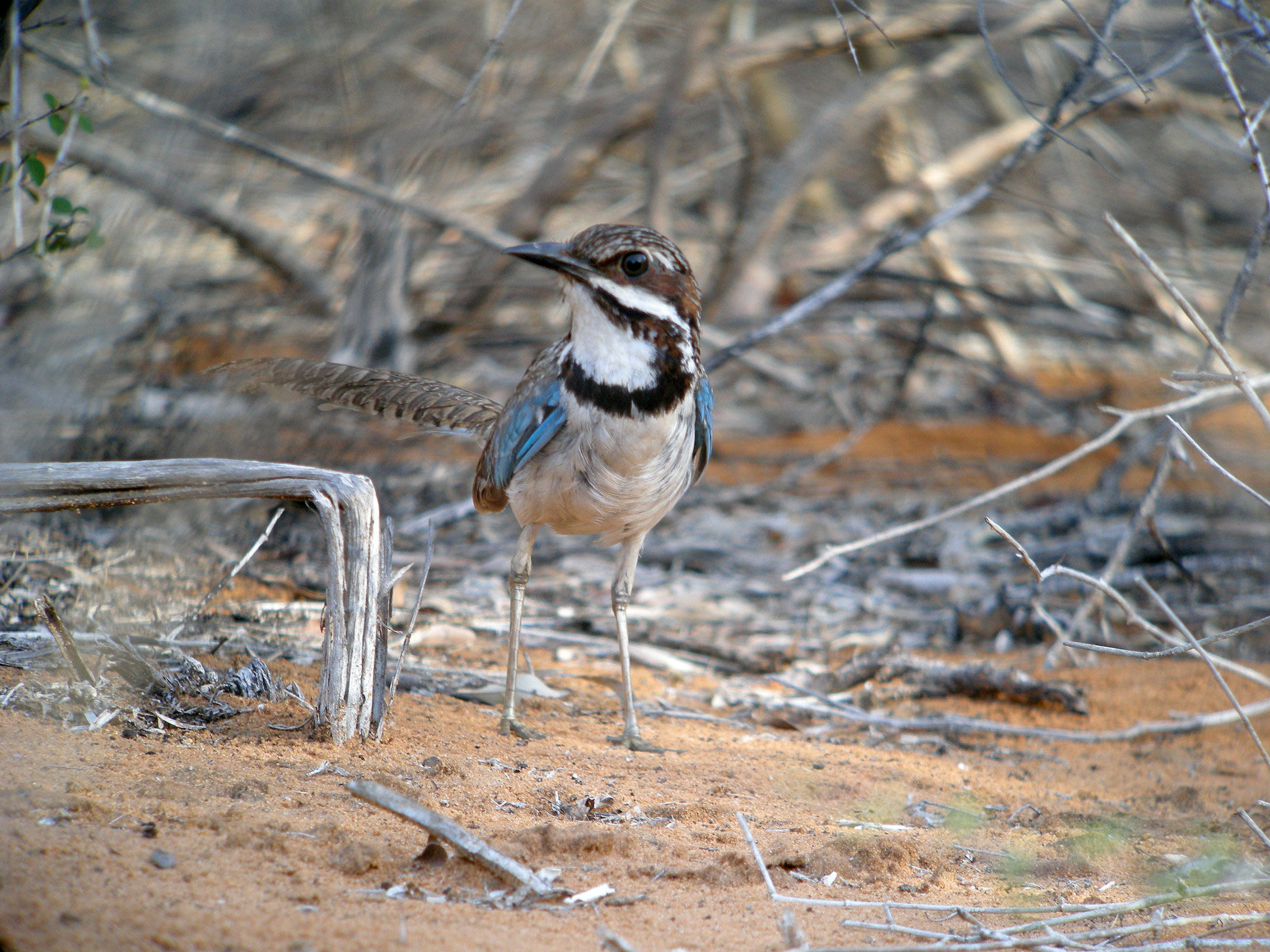
The long-tailed ground roller is largely terrestrial.

The long-tailed ground roller's silhouette is highly distinctive due to its long tail and plump silhouette. The bird is 34 to 47 centimeters (13 to 19 in) long, although its tail can contribute up to 30 centimeters (12 in) of the length, which makes it the longest tail of any of the ground rollers. This ground roller has short wings and long, pinkish-brown legs. The male has a sandy buff crown and dark brown upperparts with black streaks. Its supercilium is a pale buff color, while the ear-coverts are brown. The eyes are brown, while the short and stout beak is black. Its tongue is long with a brush-like tip to help it collect insects. A white stripe is present at the base of the bill and is surrounded by brown and black malar stripes. These malar stripes and the black breastband frame a white throat. The tail has 15 to 20 dark brown bars marking it, while the outer rectrices are sky blue; this sky blue is also present on the wing-coverts. In flight, the bird's two black and white bands on the primaries and secondaries are conspicuous. The underparts are a light gray, and the breast white. The toes are zygodactylous, with the first and fourth toes turned outwards and the middle two toes turned inwards. The female resembles the male, but is smaller and has a narrower chestband and a shorter tail. Also, the female loses her tail while nesting. These differences make the long-tailed ground roller the only ground roller to definitively display sexual dimorphism. Juveniles of both sexes resemble the adult female, but have duller plumage, particularly in the black bands on the chest, neck, and eyes.

Although it is generally a silent species, during the breeding season the vocalizations of the long-tailed ground roller include a "hooting" sound, a "popping" tu-tuc, and a soft boo sound. The low-pitched "hooting" is given by males from a perch 2 to 6 meters (6.6 to 19.7 ft) above the ground at dusk or at night. The sound carries for a distance of at least 200 meters (660 ft) and may either attract a mate or defend a territory. The bird pumps its tail while giving this call. One territorial call is a series of soft boo notes, typically coming in sets of six to ten and descending in volume near the end. Another call, given by both sexes, is a series of chuckling tu-tuc sounds lasting between 10 and 40 seconds that occasionally ends in a loud snapping sound produced by the wings. This call is given when birds are close to each other either on the ground or on low perches, and it does not carry over long distances. The use of wing-snapping to produce a sound is a rare phenomenon in birds, and in the order Coraciiformes only one other family, the todies, is known to do it. Low gu notes are given by mates as they come in contact with each other.

== Distribution and habitat ==
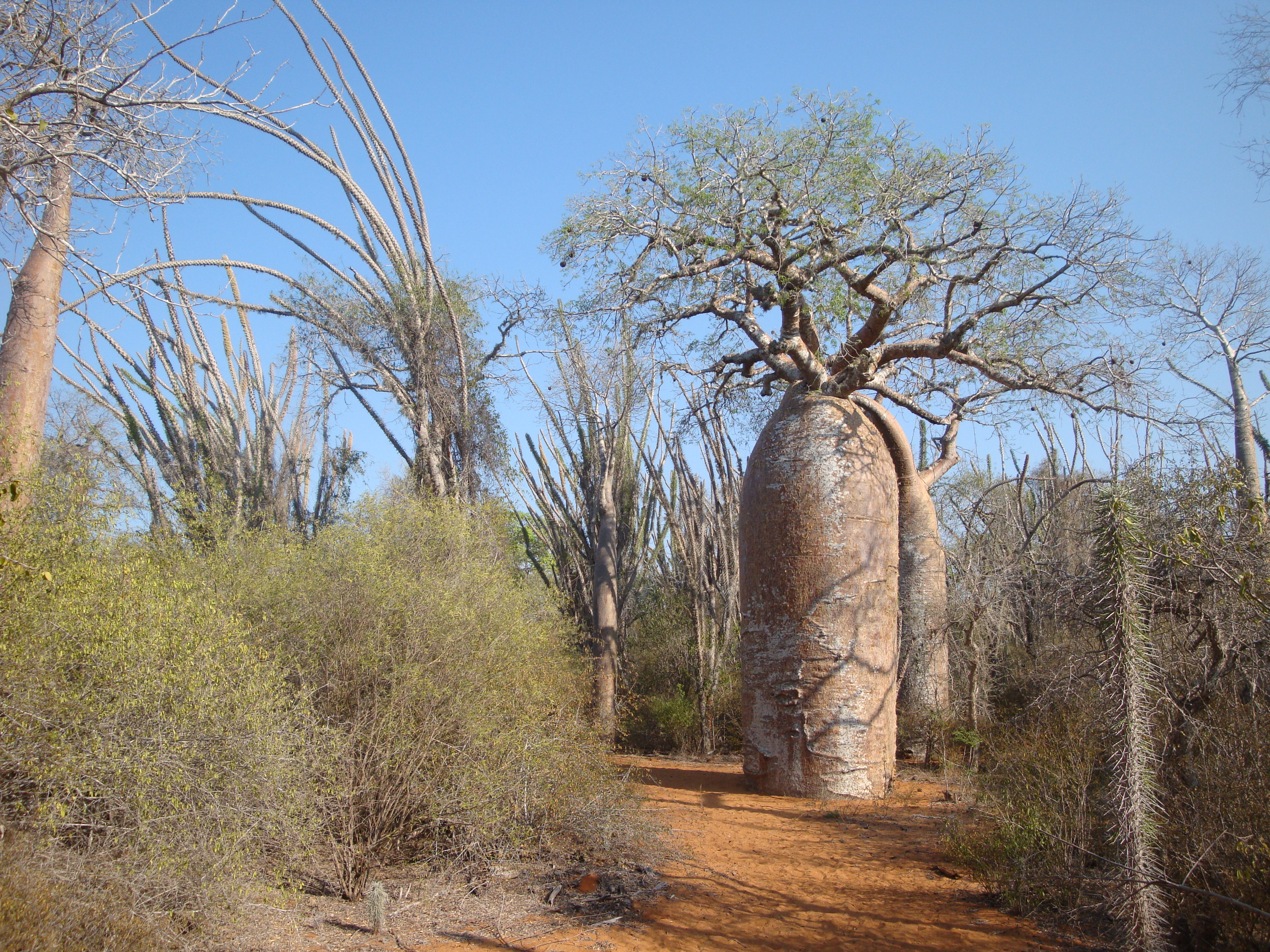
Spiny forest at Ifaty, featuring an Adansonia (baobab) species and other vegetation

Endemic to the island nation of Madagascar, the long-tailed ground roller inhabits a narrow strip of suitable habitat by the coast in the southwestern part of the island. This strip is bordered by the Mangoky River in the north, the Fiherenana River in the south, and lowland hills in the east. It totals about 10,500 square kilometers (4,100 sq mi) in area; however, the species is extremely uncommon within its range and occurs at densities of about 0.8 to 10 per square kilometer (2.1 to 25 per square mile). This area ranges in elevation from sea level to 100 meters (330 ft). The long-tailed ground roller does not migrate, though it may disperse across a larger area outside the breeding season.

This species' prime habitat is spiny forest, a mix of sub-arid thorn-scrub and deciduous woodland that only receives on average 500 millimeters (20 in) of water a year and is covered in sandy soil. The dominant plants in these spiny forests belong to the cactus-like family Didiereaceae (especially Didierea madagascariensis) and more tree-like family Euphorbiaceae (especially Euphorbia stenoclada). Baobab trees are also prevalent. It was formerly believed that the long-tailed ground roller preferred an undisturbed forest habitat, while tolerating small amounts of disturbance. Later studies have concluded that it actually prefers degraded habitat. Despite this, shade is necessary, and the species is not found in deforested habitat or on the shadeless dunes prevalent in its range.

== Ecology and behavior ==
The long-tailed ground roller is a shy and elusive bird and, if seen by a human observer, it either freezes or runs away. As its short wings suggest, the species rarely flies, but it is a powerful runner. While largely terrestrial, it roosts in low trees and bushes, and sings from low perches. Long-tailed ground rollers are solitary outside the breeding season. Although diurnal, it does occasionally forage at night unlike most other ground rollers. When calling, this ground roller bobs its head and raises its tail. The long-tailed ground roller also raises its tail when it is excited.

=== Diet ===
This species forages almost exclusively from the ground, where it alternates between remaining still and watching attentively and actively searching for it by rummaging through deep leaf litter. It eats a wide range of invertebrates, including ants, beetles, butterflies, caterpillars, cockroaches, grasshoppers, woodlice, and worms, and occasionally small vertebrates. Despite the long-tailed ground roller's poor flying abilities, it has been seen catching butterflies in midair.

=== Reproduction ===
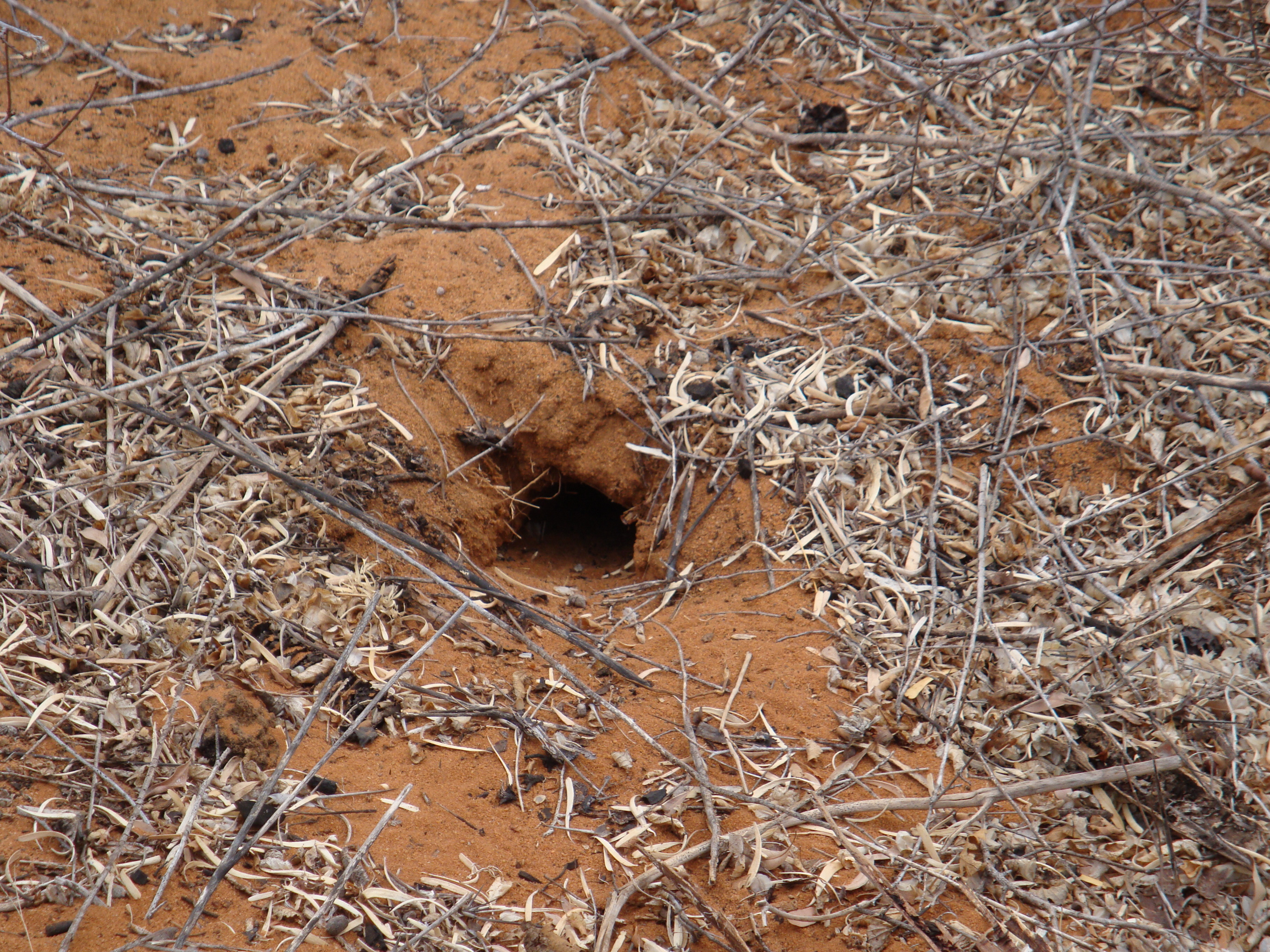
Entrance to a nesting burrow

The breeding season coincides with the rainy season, which lasts from October to January. During this period this bird abandons its solitary habits to find a mate, with which it remains monogamous. Males form territories during the breeding season, and they defend their area with territorial calls. These calls are given from a perch up to 6 meters (20 ft) off the ground for an hour after sunrise and occasionally throughout the day and night. During courtship, males have been observed feeding the female.

Male and female long-tailed ground rollers use their bills and feet to excavate a burrow in consolidated, flat sand and construct their nest at the end of it. The burrow, always constructed away from grassy vegetation, is downward-sloping and is between 0.8 and 1.2 meters (2.6 and 3.9 ft) long with a diameter of 8 centimeters (3.1 in). The end of the burrow widens into a 20-centimeter (7.9 in) wide chamber with a shallow depression covered in dry leaves and earthy pellets. When digging its nest, the long-tailed ground roller occasionally walks underneath a low branch, tilts its head upwards, and, while remaining motionless, releases a rising crescendo of its tu-tuc calls. At the height of the crescendo the bird breaks off its call and flies upwards onto the branch while producing a "ripping and crackling sound" with its wingbeats. From the perch the bird releases a stream of boo notes. This display is thought to be part of a courtship ritual. Each pair digs one to six nesting burrows during the breeding season; the extra burrows are known as speculative burrows.

Between October and January, and peaking in November, the species normally lays two smooth, white eggs, though sometimes it lays three or four. The incubation period and fledging time of this ground roller is unknown. After the young fledge, they live in a family group of four to five birds until approximately February, at which point the family disperses.

== Conservation ==
Classified as vulnerable by the IUCN due to ongoing habitat destruction and a decline in the quality of the remaining habitat, the long-tailed ground roller is believed to be the most threatened species of ground roller. Thirty percent of its already small habitat area was degraded between the mid-1970s and 2000. Slash-and-burn agriculture, charcoal production, logging, and cattle grazing have all contributed to the loss of habitat. As of 2012, no reserves protect any portion of its habitat, and as a result its habitat has been described as the area of Madagascar most in need of conservation efforts. It is also threatened by both hunting and egg-collecting. In addition to humans, dogs hunt this species, and the introduced black rat is a nest predator. This ground roller is capable of tolerating some habitat disturbance, but requires a suitable amount of shade and leaf litter to continue living in the area. Although it was fairly common at the beginning of the twentieth century, its population went into decline and it was considered rare by the 1960s. As of 2012, the estimated population of the long-tailed ground roller is between 9,500 and 32,700 birds and declining.

== Relationship with humans ==
As the long-tailed ground roller is remarkably silent and difficult to see during the non-breeding season, the local inhabitants of Madagascar once believed that this bird hibernated in its burrows. While not particularly tasty, this species is hunted for food due to its large size and the relative ease of capture compared with arboreal birds. In the early twentieth century, it was hunted by herdsmen with blowguns. In the 1950s and 1960s, natives trapped this ground roller and dug out its nesting burrows. This bird has been featured on several of Madagascar's stamps. Only one zoo, Germany's Weltvogelpark Walsrode, keeps this species. It is considered by birdwatchers to be one of the world's most elusive birds.
