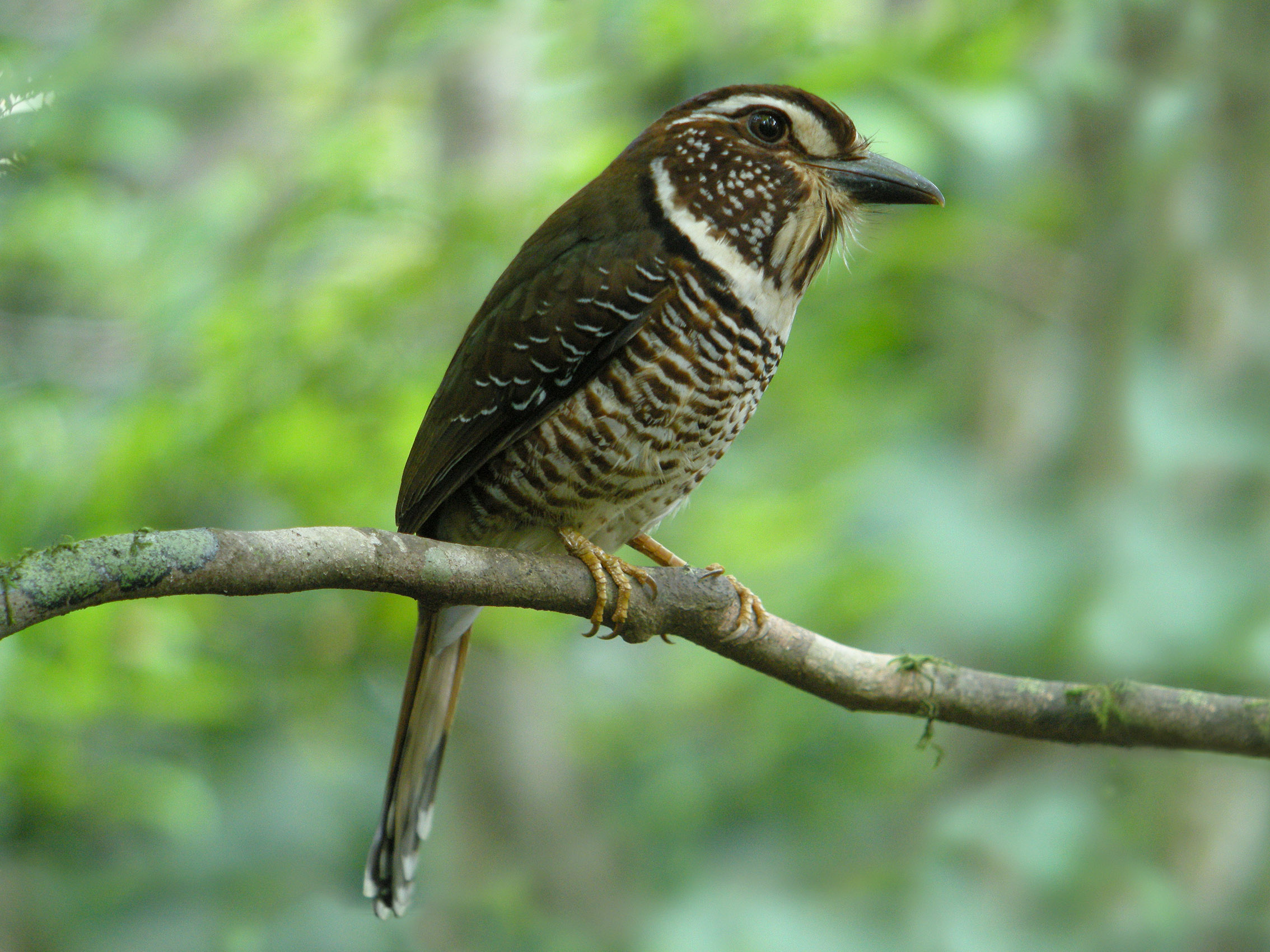

Conservation status
- Vulnerable (IUCN 3.1)

Scientific classification
- Kingdom: Animalia
- Phylum: Chordata
- Class: Aves
- Order: Coraciiformes
- Family: Brachypteraciidae
- Genus: Brachypteracias
- Species: B. leptosomus

Binomial name
- Brachypteracias leptosomus (Lesson, 1833)

= Short-legged ground roller =

Species of bird

The short-legged ground roller (Brachypteracias leptosomus) is a species of bird in the ground roller family Brachypteraciidae. It is the only living species in the genus Brachypteracias and is endemic to Madagascar. It is threatened by habitat loss.

== Taxonomy and systematics ==
The short-legged ground roller is the only extant species in the genus Brachypteracias, although a fossil species, Brachypteracias langrandi, has been described. The short-legged ground roller is more arboreal than other ground rollers, and may represent the ancestral form of the family. The genus Brachypteracias once included the scaly ground roller, but a 2001 study of the DNA of the family found that the two are not closely related. The same study found that the short-legged ground roller is basal in the family.

The genus name is derived from the Ancient Greek brakhupteros for short-winged. The species name leptosomus is also of Greek origin, and is derived from leptos for delicate and sōma for body.

== Distribution and habitat ==
The short-legged ground roller is endemic to Madagascar, where it is present in the northern part of the island through the eastern coast, to the southern end of the island. Its natural habitat is humid tropical moist lowland forests, from sea-level to 1,500 m (4,900 ft), although it is more common at lower altitudes. It is almost exclusively found in mature closed forest with large trees, but it can also be found on slopes with numerous saplings. It is rarely seen in disturbed forests.

== Description ==
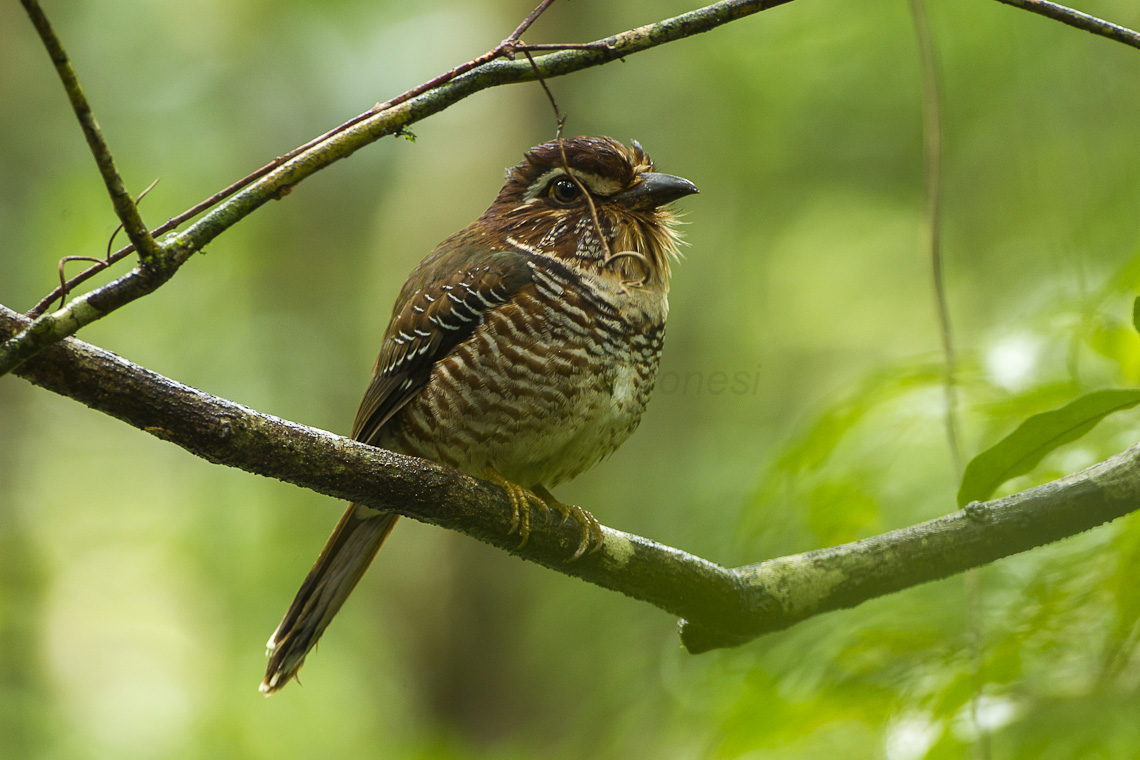
The throat of this species is puffy

The short-legged ground roller has a large head and bill, and a puffy throat. It is the largest forest ground roller, and is stouter than the other species (except for the scaly ground roller). It measures 30 to 38 cm (12–15 in) in length, and weighs 154–217 g (5.4–7.7 oz). Where sexed individuals have been weighed, the males were heavier, but the sample size was small. Females are smaller in other body measurements, for example the wing chord length, which is 138 to 143 mm (5.4–5.6 in) in females compared to 140 to 152 mm (5.5–6.0 in) in males. As the name suggests, the legs are short for the family, but contrary to its generic name, the wings are the longest in the family, making this the most arboreal species, but it is still not a strong flier.

Like the other members of the family, the plumage is cryptic.

== Behaviour ==
The short-legged ground roller is a secretive species that has only been limitedly studied. Everything that is known about the behaviour of the species has come from a single systematic study of a single pair in Masoala National Park, and from incidental observations of other birds.

== Status and conservation ==
The short-legged ground roller is considered to be fairly common in its natural habitat. Nevertheless, it is considered to be threatened with extinction due to the rapid loss of its habitat to slash and burns for subsistence agriculture. Its habitat is also considered to be threatened by climate change. Modelling of habitat change due to climate change predicts that the species may lose up to 62% of its current habitat. The species is also hunted.
