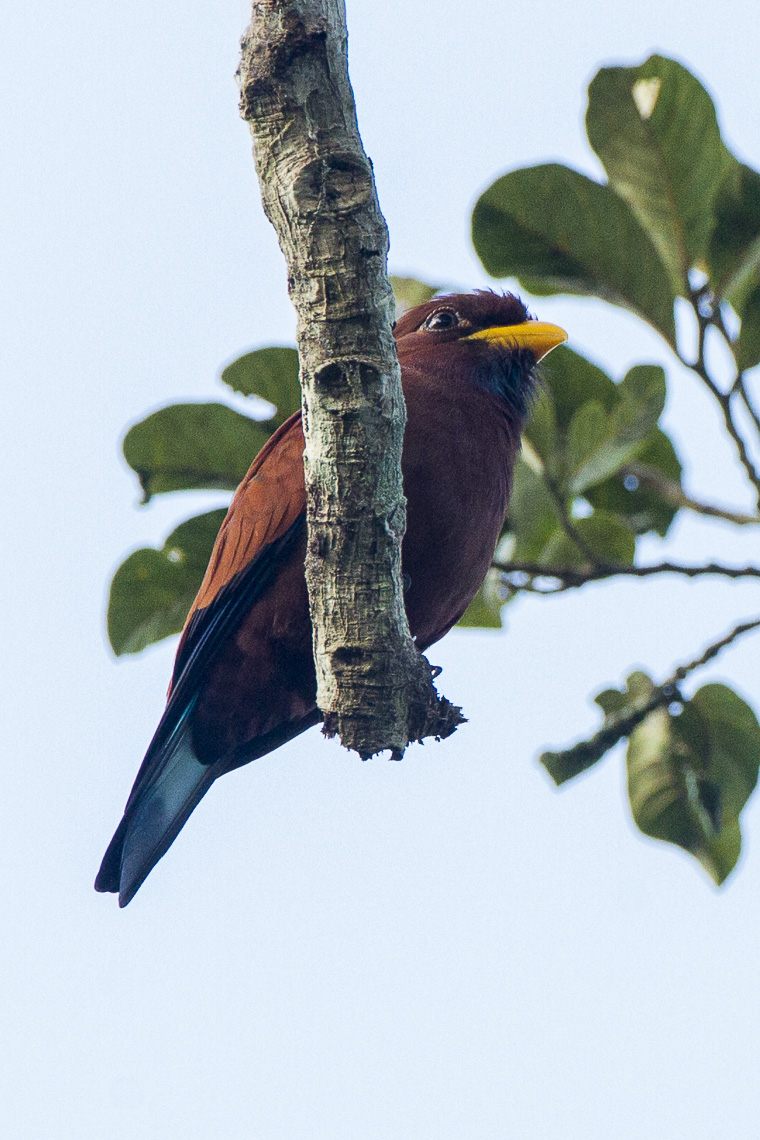

Conservation status
- Least Concern (IUCN 3.1)

Scientific classification
- Kingdom: Animalia
- Phylum: Chordata
- Class: Aves
- Order: Coraciiformes
- Family: Coraciidae
- Genus: Eurystomus
- Species: E. gularis

Binomial name
- Eurystomus gularis Vieillot, 1819
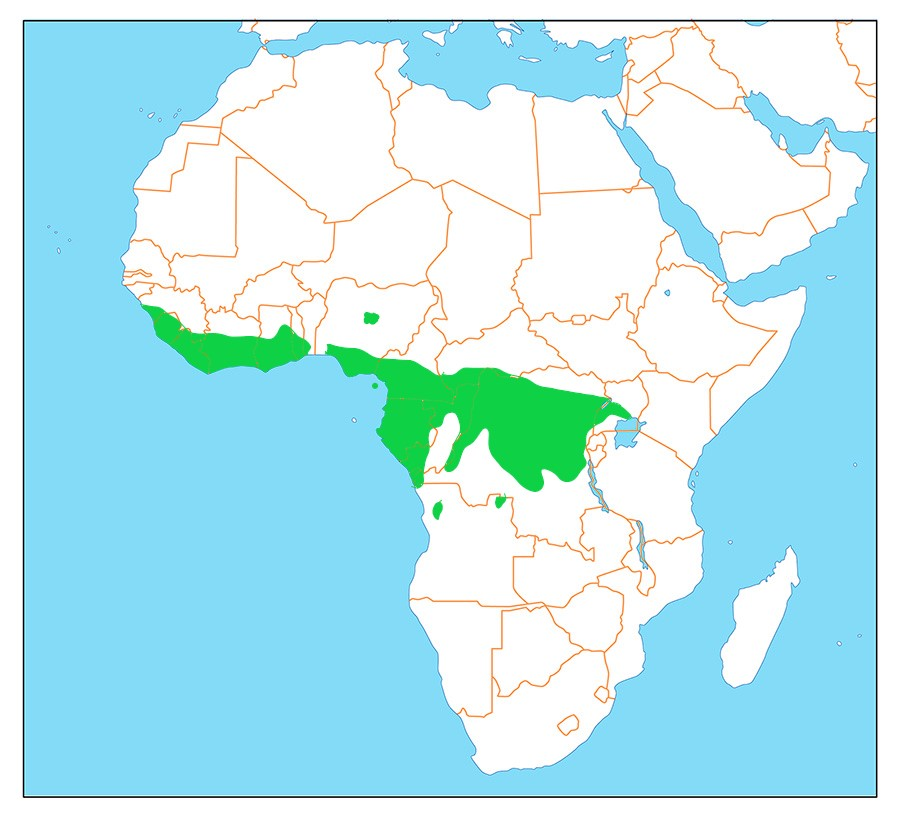
- resident range

= Blue-throated roller =

Species of bird

The blue-throated roller (Eurystomus gularis) is a species of roller in the family Coraciidae. It is native to the African tropical rainforest.

== Taxonomy and systematics ==
The blue-throated roller was formally described in 1819 by the French ornithologist Louis Pierre Vieillot under its current binomial name Eurystomus gularis. The specific epithet gularis is Modern Latin meaning "-throated". Vieillot based his description on a specimen in the Muséum National d'Histoire Naturelle in Paris which he mistaken believed had been collected in "Australasie"; the type locality has been designated as Senegal. A molecular phylogenetic study published in 2018 found that the blue-throated roller was most closely related to the broad-billed roller (Eurystomus glaucurus).

Two subspecies are recognized:

- E. g. gularis - Vieillot, 1819: Found from Guinea to western Cameroon
- E. g. neglectus - Neumann, 1908: Found from south-eastern Nigeria and southern Cameroon to northern Angola and Uganda

== Description ==
The blue-throated roller is a dumpy, large-headed, thick-necked bird that frequents the tops of trees. Overall, it is a dark bird, mainly chestnut brown with a bright yellow bill and a blue patch on the throat, a blue tail and purplish blue wings. The juvenile shows bluish on the underparts. It is a rather long-winged roller and can give a falcon like silhouette in flight. It measures 25 cm in length; the males weigh 82–117.5 g, the females 88–108g.

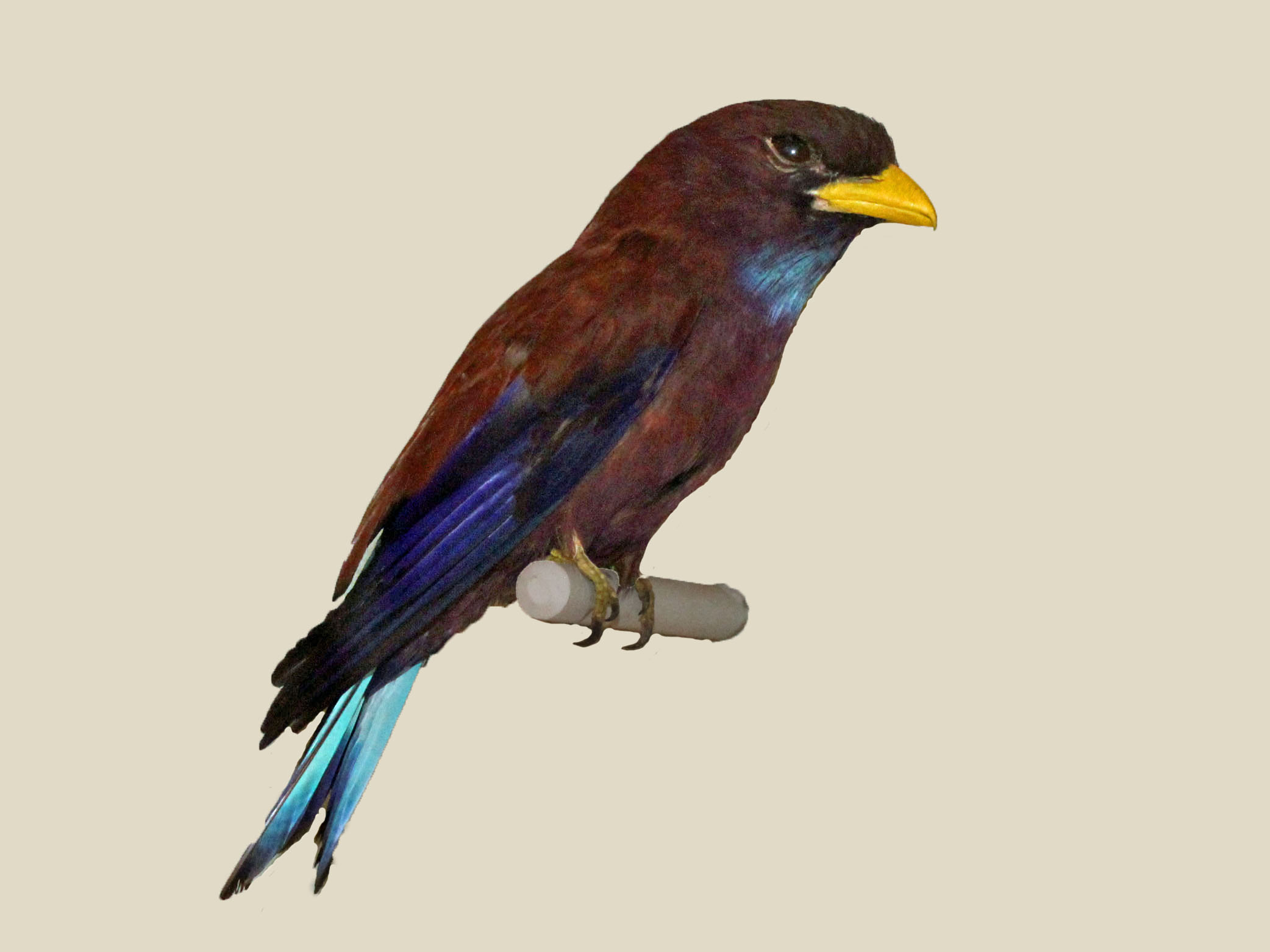
a specimen at Nairobi National Museum

== Distribution and habitat ==
The blue-throated roller occurs in western sub-Saharan Africa from Guinea to Cameroon, south to northern Angola, and west to south-eastern Uganda. It is also found on Bioko Island.

The blue-throated roller tends to remain high up in the tops of trees and hunts above the canopy of primary and secondary rainforest, plantations, gallery forests and relict forest patches in cleared regions. They prefer clearings, riversides and giant emergent trees.

== Behaviour and ecology ==
The blue-throated roller perches high up, either singly or in pairs, on bare branches, frequently at the very top of the canopy. They often sit for long periods, and sometimes make their shrill chattering calls. When active they hawk insects in the air and aggressively defend their territory from other bird species. In the late afternoon the birds gather in small flocks, often mixed with broad-billed rollers, to feed on ants and termites which emerge after a rainfall. The rollers feed on these insects in flight, acrobatically chasing them and eating them on the wing. This activity continues until dusk and one roller may eat over 700 insects weighing 40g.

The blue-throated roller is a territorial species when breeding and both courtship and territorial defence involve noisy aerial chases. The nest is an unlined cavity, normally about 10m up the trunk of a tree on the edge of a clearing; 2-3 eggs are laid with laying recorded in February to March in the Ivory Coast, February to April in Ghana, April and September in Nigeria, January in Gabon, and April and October in the Democratic Republic of Congo.
