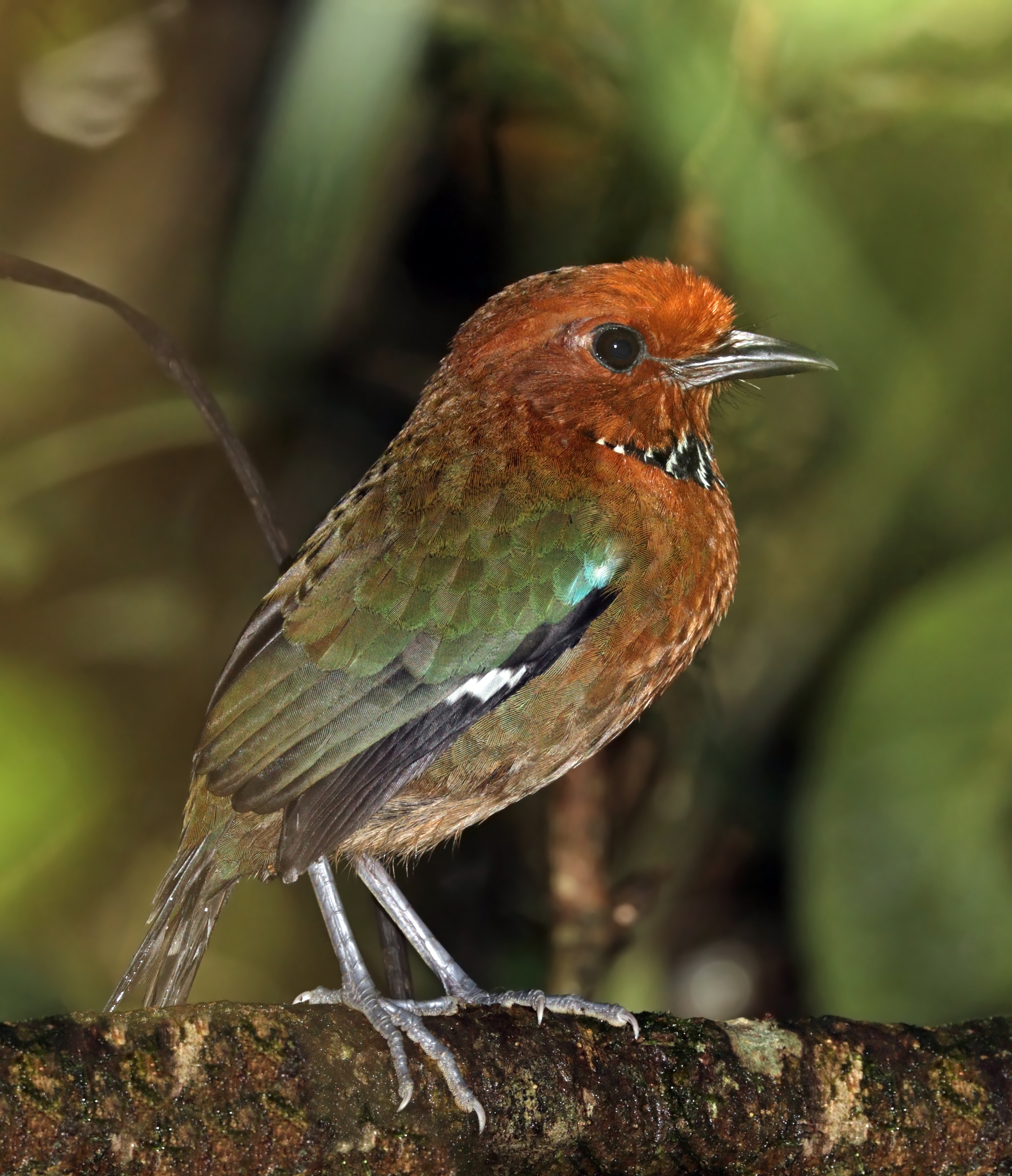
- Ranomafana National Park

Conservation status
- Near Threatened (IUCN 3.1)

Scientific classification
- Kingdom: Animalia
- Phylum: Chordata
- Class: Aves
- Order: Coraciiformes
- Family: Brachypteraciidae
- Genus: Atelornis
- Species: A. crossleyi

Binomial name
- Atelornis crossleyi Sharpe, 1875

= Rufous-headed ground roller =

Species of bird

The rufous-headed ground roller (Atelornis crossleyi) is a species of bird in the ground roller family, Brachypteraciidae. It is endemic to Madagascar. There are currently five known species of ground rollers. Four of these species live in the eastern and central highland humid forests. Unlike the four other species, the fifth species lives in the dry southwestern spiny bushes of Madagascar. The Atelornis crossleyi species of the ground rollers lives with most of its family in humid forests. The International Union for Conservation of Nature considers the bird to be near-threatened because, although it is present in a number of protected areas, it is hunted for food and the forests in which it lives are threatened by slash-and-burn cultivation. The bird's scientific name commemorates Alfred Crossley who collected mammals, birds, butterflies and moths in Madagascar and Cameroon in the 1860s and 1870s. Many of these are in the Natural History Museum, London.

== Description ==
The sexes are similar in this distinctively-coloured bird about 25 cm (10 in) long. The head and breast are reddish-brown, the upper parts olive green and the underparts buff with darker markings. There is a narrow blackish collar with white vertical streaks on the upper breast and an iridescent light blue patch on the carpal wing joint. The tail is short and the beak and legs are grey.

== Distribution and habitat ==
The rufous-headed ground roller is endemic to eastern Madagascar where it is found in montane evergreen rain forests at altitudes between 800 and 2,000 m (2,600 and 6,600 ft), but is most common between 1,250 and 1,750 m (4,100 and 5,700 ft). Although present in most mountain regions, it is absent from Montagne d'Ambre in the far north of the island.

== Ecology ==
The rufous-headed ground roller is terrestrial and feeds amongst dense vegetation on the ground, taking a range of prey, particularly insects such as ants, beetles and their larvae, caterpillars, butterflies and cockroaches. It nests in a burrow up to 50 cm (20 in) deep in an earth bank. Breeding probably takes place in December and January, and the clutch size is normally two eggs.
