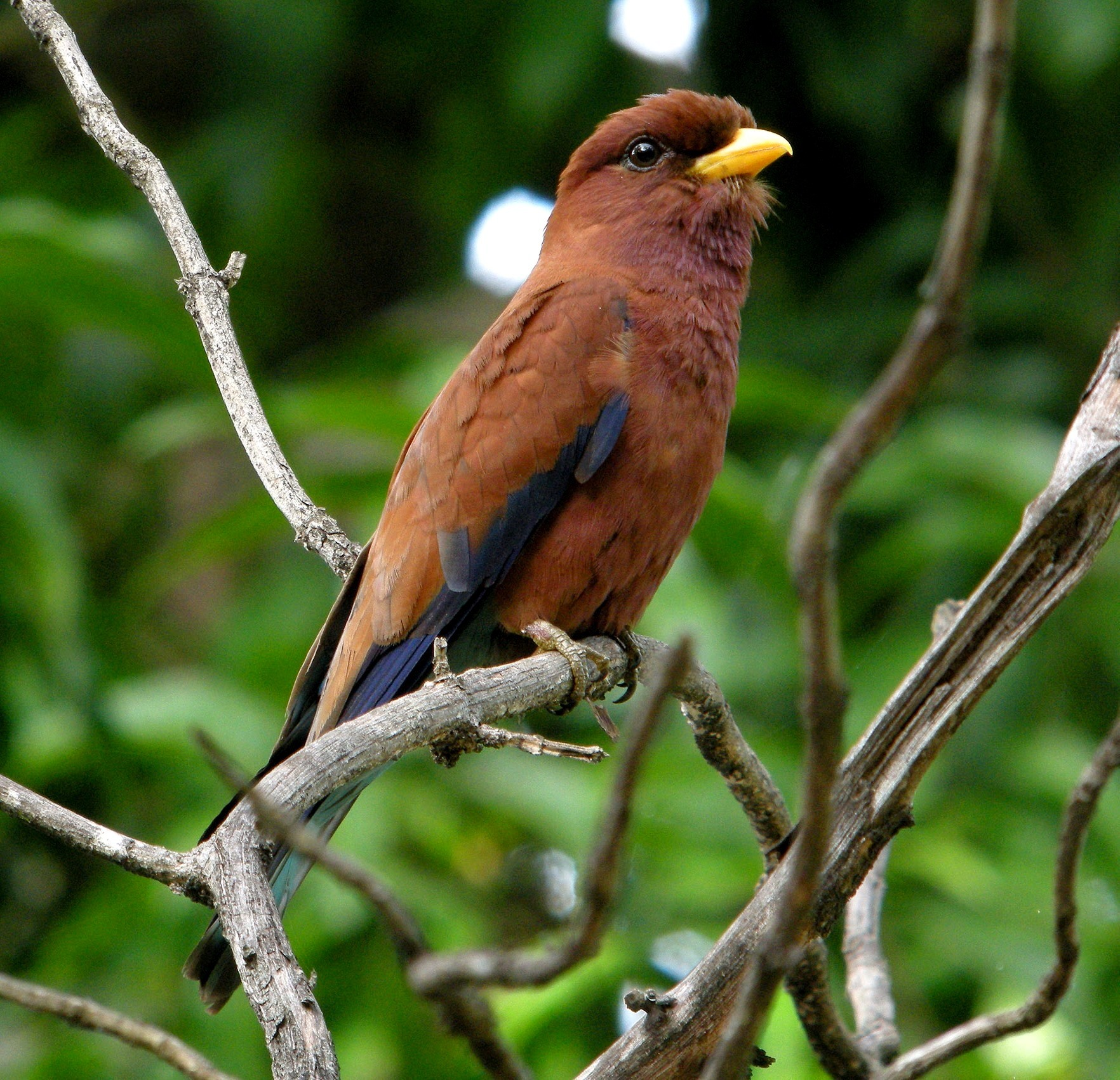

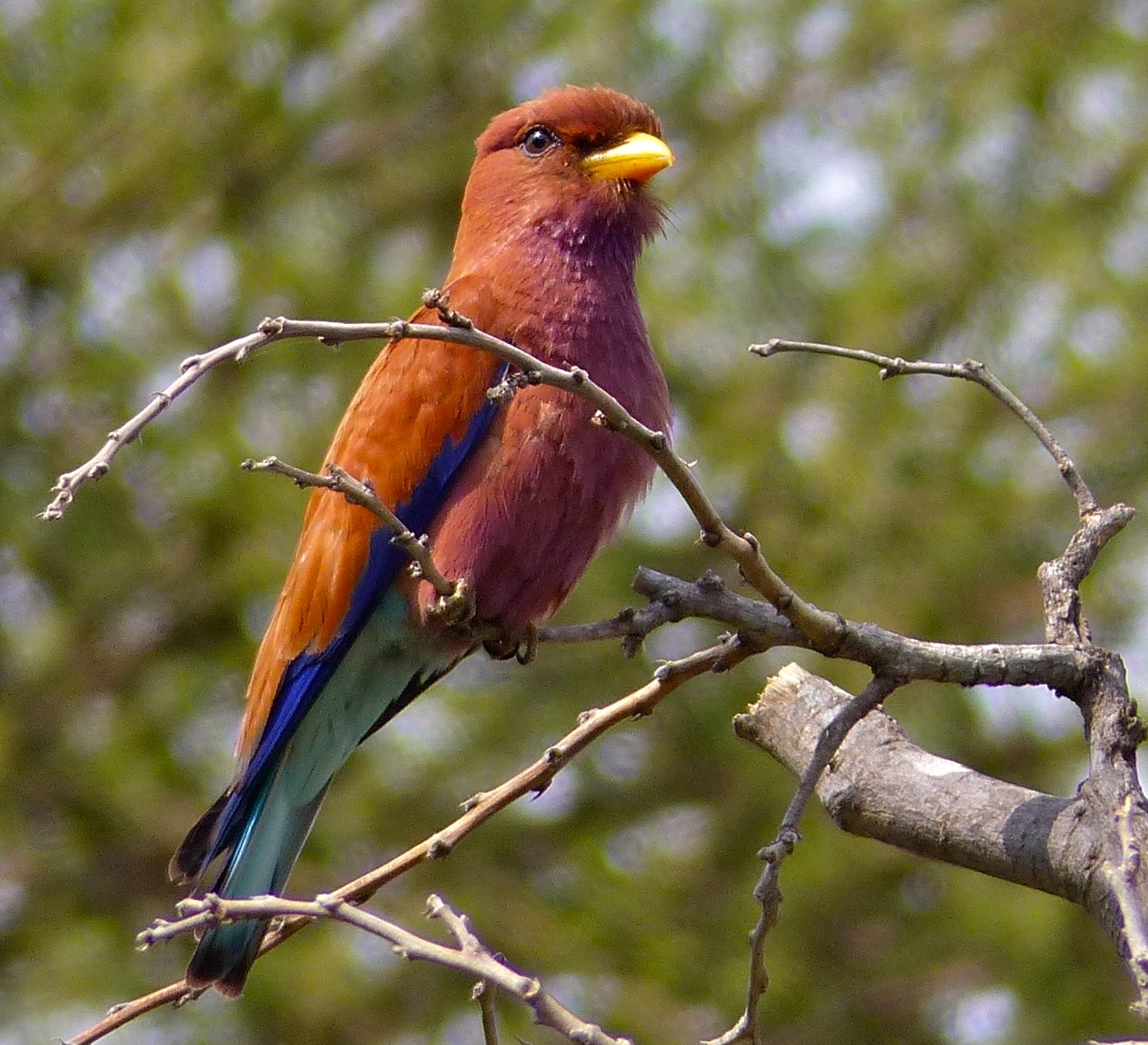
- Nominate race in Madagascar (above) E. g. suahelicus in South Africa (below)

Conservation status
- Least Concern (IUCN 3.1)

Scientific classification
- Kingdom: Animalia
- Phylum: Chordata
- Class: Aves
- Order: Coraciiformes
- Family: Coraciidae
- Genus: Eurystomus
- Species: E. glaucurus

Binomial name
- Eurystomus glaucurus (Müller, PLS, 1776)
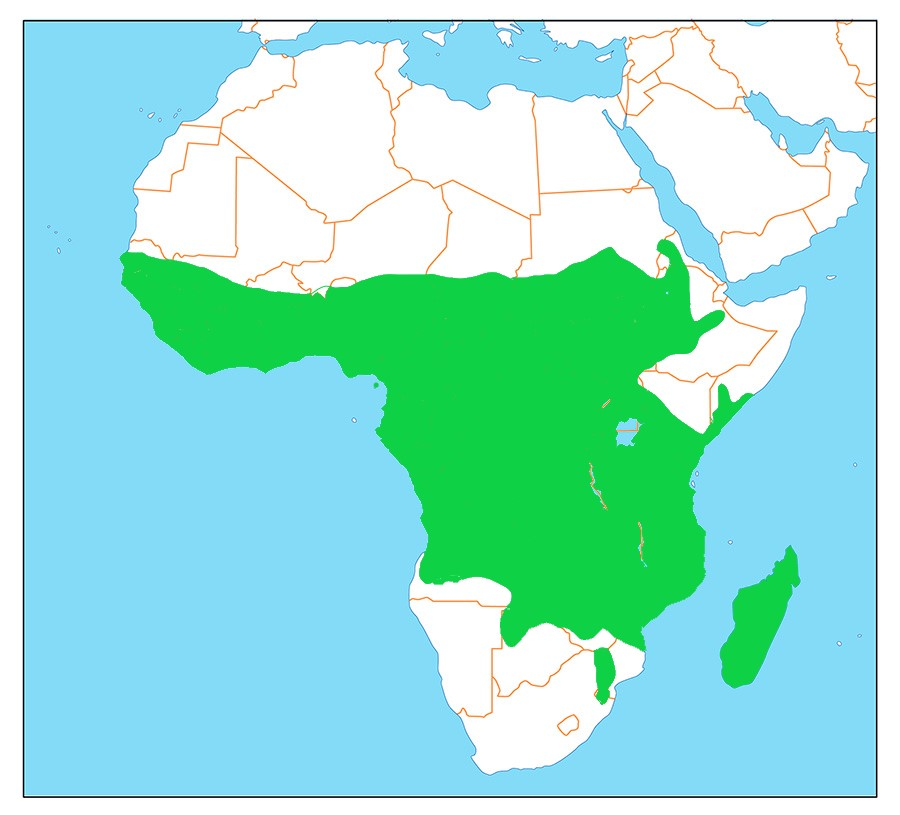
- native range

Synonyms
- Coracias glaucurus; Eurystomus afer; Eurystomus orientalis calonyx

= Broad-billed roller =

Species of bird

The broad-billed roller (Eurystomus glaucurus) is a member of the roller family of birds which breeds across tropical Africa and Madagascar in all but the driest regions. It is a wet season breeder, which migrates from the northern and southern areas of its range towards the moister equatorial belt in the dry season.

== Taxonomy ==
The broad-billed roller was formally described in 1776 by the German zoologist Philipp Ludwig Statius Müller under the binomial name Coracias glaucurus. The specific epithet is from Ancient Greek glaukos meaning "blue-grey". Statius Müller based his brief description on "Le Rollier de Madagascar" that had been described in 1775 by the French polymath Georges-Louis Leclerc, Comte de Buffon and illustrated by Edme-Louis Daubenton. The type locality is Madagascar. The broad-billed roller is now placed in the genus Eurystomus that was introduced in 1816 by the French ornithologist Louis Pierre Vieillot. A molecular phylogenetic study published in 2018 found that the broad-billed roller was most closely related to the blue-throated roller (Eurystomus gularis). Alternate names for the broad-billed roller include the African broad-billed roller and the cinnamon roller.

Four subspecies are recognized:

- E. g. aethiopicus Neumann, 1905, the Nile Valley broad-billed roller or Abyssinian broad-billed roller is found in Ethiopia
- E. g. afer (Latham, 1790), originally described as a separate species in the genus Coracias, is found from Senegambia to northern Democratic Republic of Congo and South Sudan
- E. g. suahelicus Neumann, 1905, the East African broad-billed roller, is found in from Somalia to Uganda, northern Zambia, Angola, Mozambique and north-eastern South Africa
- E. g. glaucurus (Statius Muller, 1776), the Madagascar roller or Madagascar broad-billed roller, breeds in Madagascar but ranges to mainland Africa in winter

== Description ==
The broad-billed roller is 29–30 cm in length. It has a warm back and head, lilac foreneck and breast, with the rest of the plumage mainly brown. The broad bill is bright yellow. Sexes are similar, but the juvenile is a drabber version of the adult, with a pale breast. The broad-billed roller is striking in its strong direct flight, with the brilliant blues of the wings and tail contrasting with the brown back.

The call of the broad-billed roller is a snarling k-k-k-k-k-r-r-r-r-r sound.

== Distribution and habitat ==
This is a species of open woodland with some tall trees, preferably near water. These rollers often perch prominently on trees, posts or overhead wires, like giant shrikes.

== Behaviour and ecology ==
They are inactive for most of the day, apart from chasing intruders, but in late afternoon they hunt for the swarming ants and termites on which they feed, sometimes in groups of 100 or more rollers. They drink like swallows, dipping their bills into water in flight.

This bird nests in an unlined hole in a tree cavity, laying 2-3 eggs.
