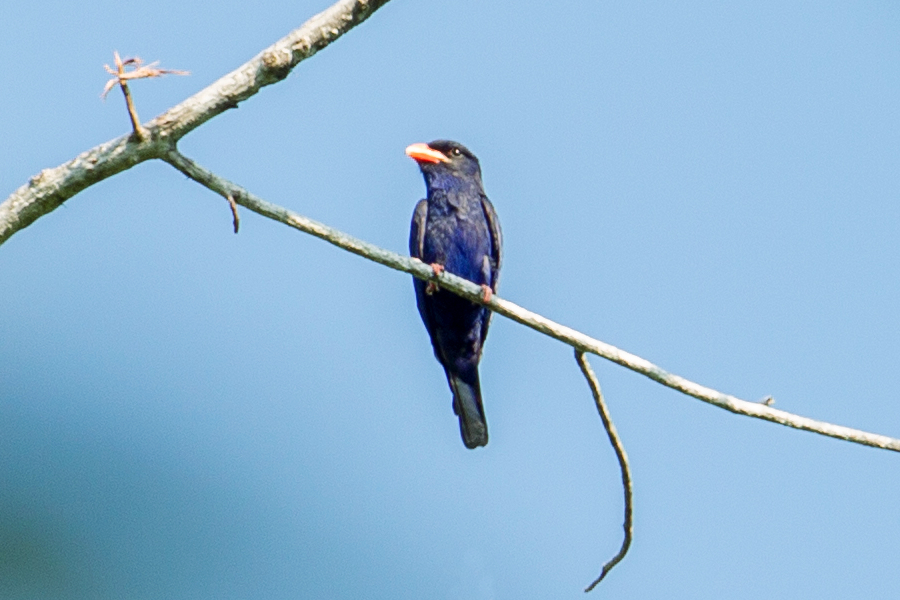
- Azure dollarbird, Halmahera Timur, Indonesia

Conservation status
- Near Threatened (IUCN 3.1)

Scientific classification
- Kingdom: Animalia
- Phylum: Chordata
- Class: Aves
- Order: Coraciiformes
- Family: Coraciidae
- Genus: Eurystomus
- Species: E. azureus

Binomial name
- Eurystomus azureus Gray, G.R., 1861

Synonyms
- Eurystomus orientalis azureus

= Azure dollarbird =

Species of bird

The azure dollarbird (Eurystomus azureus) also known as the azure roller, purple dollarbird or purple roller, is a species of bird in the family Coraciidae. It is endemic to North Maluku in Indonesia. Formerly, some authorities considered the azure dollarbird to be a subspecies of the oriental dollarbird.

A molecular phylogenetic study by Ulf Johansson and collaborators published in 2018 found that the azure dollarbird was nested in a clade containing subspecies of the Oriental dollarbird (Eurystomus orientalis).

== Habitat ==
The azure dollarbird's natural habitats are subtropical or tropical moist lowland forest and plantations. It is negatively affected by habitat loss. For some time, it was assumed to be decreasing in numbers quite rapidly and it was uplisted to Vulnerable in the 2000 IUCN Red List. However, more recently it was determined to be, although still declining, more common than previously believed, and thus it was downlisted to Near Threatened in 2007.
