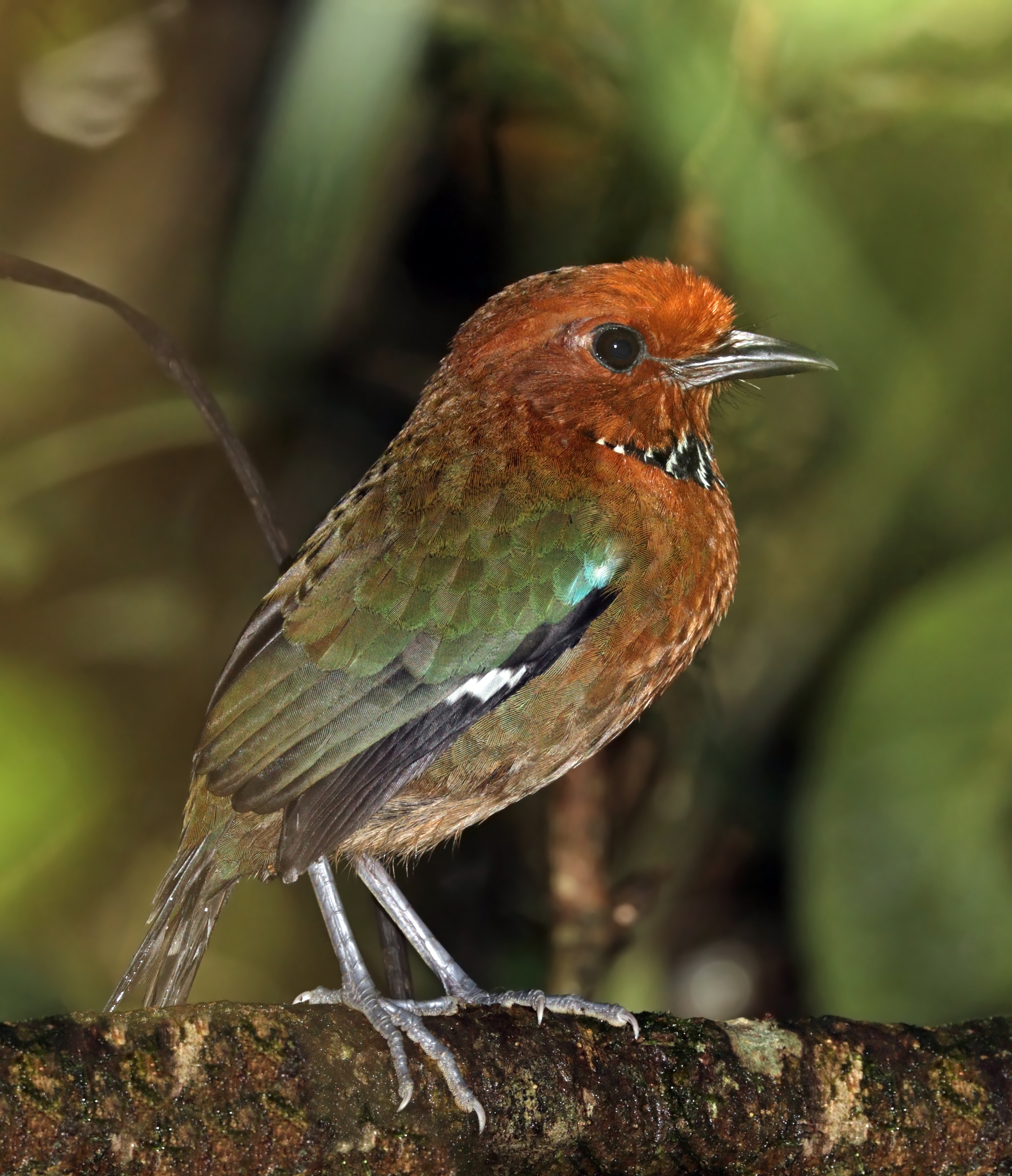
- Rufous-headed ground-roller (Atelornis crossleyi), in Ranomafana National Park, Madagascar

Scientific classification
- Kingdom: Animalia
- Phylum: Chordata
- Class: Aves
- Order: Coraciiformes
- Family: Brachypteraciidae; Bonaparte, 1854

Genera
- Brachypteracias; Geobiastes; Atelornis; Uratelornis

Synonyms
- Atelornithidae Chenu & Des Murs 1852

= Ground roller =

Family of birds

The ground rollers, Brachypteraciidae, are a small family of non-migratory birds restricted to Madagascar. They are members of the order Coraciiformes, and are most closely related to the rollers in the family Coraciidae; Brachypteraciidae and Coraciidae together make up the suborder Coracii within Coraciiformes.

== Description ==
Ground rollers share the generally crow-like size and build of the true rollers, ranging from 25 to 49 centimetres (9.8–19.3 in) in length, and also hunt reptiles and large insects. They are more terrestrial than Coraciidae species, and this is reflected in their longer legs and shorter, more rounded wings.

They lack the highly colourful appearance of the true rollers, and are duller in appearance, with striped or flecked plumage. They are much more elusive and shy than their relatives, and are normally difficult to find in the Malagasy forests. Often the hooting breeding call is all that betrays their presence.

These birds nest as solitary pairs in holes in the ground which they excavate themselves, unlike the true rollers, which rarely nest in ground holes and even then do not dig their own nests.

== Taxonomy ==
The phylogenetic relationship between the six families that make up the order Coraciiformes is shown in the cladogram below. The number of species in each family is taken from the list maintained by Frank Gill, Pamela C. Rasmussen and David Donsker on behalf of the International Ornithological Committee (IOC).

- Coraciiformes
  - - Meropidae – bee-eaters (31 species)
    - - Brachypteraciidae – ground rollers (5 extant species)
      - Coraciidae – rollers (13 species)
  - - Todidae – todies (5 species)
    - - Momotidae – motmots (14 species)
      - Alcedinidae – kingfishers (118 species)

mtDNA analyses confirmed the systematics of this group but indicated that merging Geobiastes into Brachypteracias, as was usually done since the 1960s, should be reversed at least until a more comprehensive review (e.g. supported by fossils) is possible (Kirchman et al., 2001). Also, 2000-year-old subfossil remains of ground rollers are known from the Holocene of Ampoza (Goodman, 2000); Eocene remains from Europe at first tentatively assigned to this family were later recognized as quite distinct (Mayr & Mourer-Chauviré 2000). Presently, there is no indication that ground rollers ever occurred anywhere outside Madagascar (Mayr & Mourer-Chauviré, 2001).

== Species ==
There are five extant species in four genera in the family Brachypteraciidae:

Image	Genus	Living species
	Brachypteracias Lafresnaye, 1834	Short-legged ground roller, Brachypteracias leptosomus
	Geobiastes Sharpe, 1871	Scaly ground roller, Geobiastes squamiger
	Uratelornis Rothschild, 1895	Long-tailed ground roller, Uratelornis chimaera
	Atelornis Pucheran, 1846	Pitta-like ground roller, Atelornis pittoides; Rufous-headed ground roller, Atelornis crossleyi

An extinct species, the Ampoza ground roller (Brachypteracias langrandi), of presumed Holocene age, was described in 2000 based on a single humerus.
