= Oriental dollarbird =

- Adult E. o. orientalis, Malaysia

Conservation status
- Least Concern (IUCN 3.1)

Scientific classification
- Kingdom: Animalia
- Phylum: Chordata
- Class: Aves
- Order: Coraciiformes
- Family: Coraciidae
- Genus: Eurystomus
- Species: E. orientalis

Binomial name
- Eurystomus orientalis (Linnaeus, 1766)
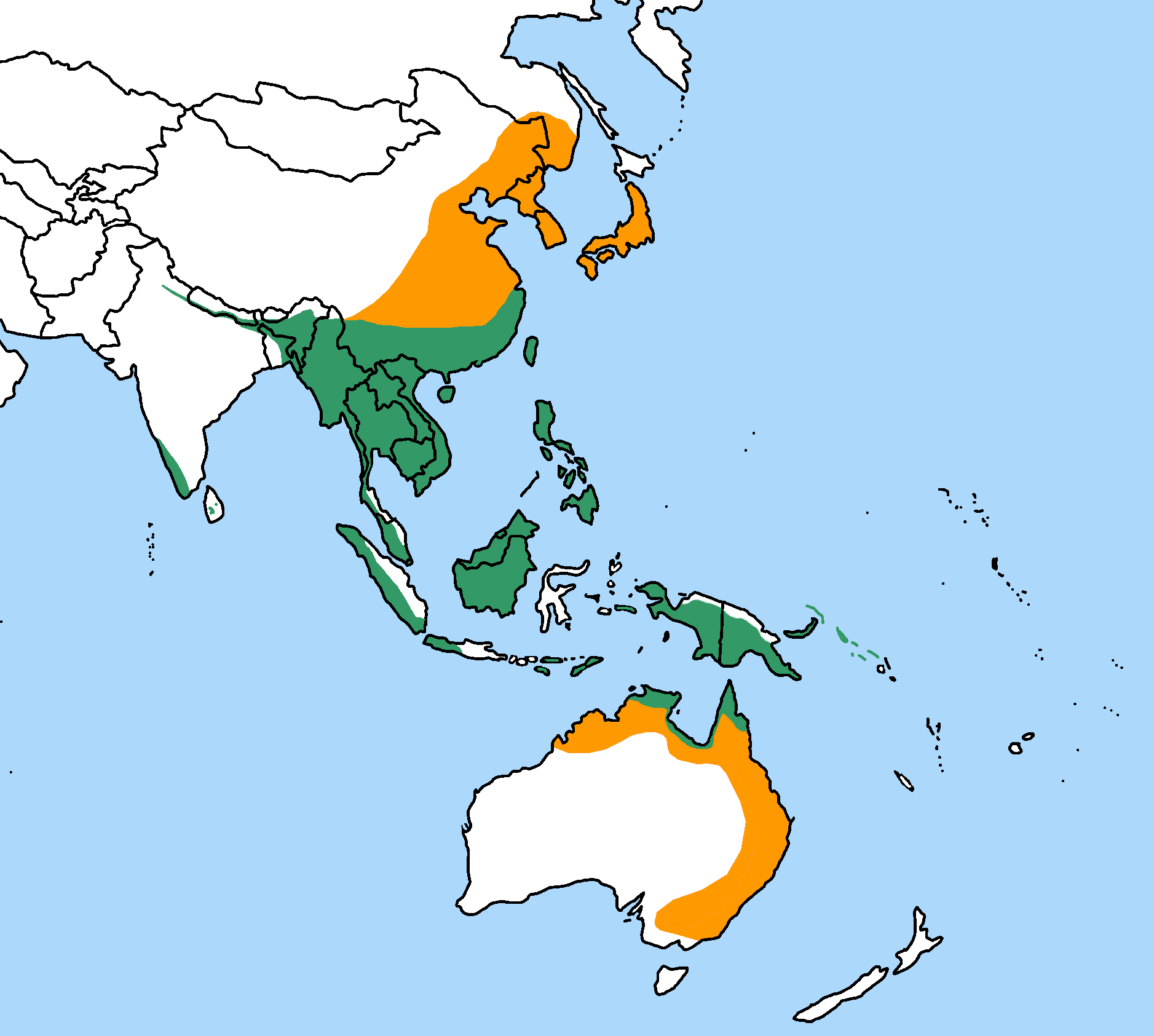
- Distribution of the oriental dollarbird

Synonyms
- Coracias orientalis Linnaeus, 1766

Species of bird

The Oriental dollarbird (Eurystomus orientalis) is a bird of the roller family, so named because of the distinctive pale blue or white, coin-shaped spots on its wings. It can be found from Australia to Korea, Japan and India.

== Taxonomy ==
The Oriental dollarbird was formally described by the Swedish naturalist Carl Linnaeus in 1766 in the twelfth edition of his Systema Naturae under the binomial name Coracias orientalis. Linnaeus based his description on "Le Rollier des Indes" that had been described and illustrated by the French zoologist Mathurin Jacques Brisson in 1760. The type locality is the island of Java in Indonesia. The Oriental dollarbird is now placed in the genus Eurystomus that was introduced in 1816 by the French ornithologist Louis Pierre Vieillot.

A molecular phylogenetic study published in 2018 found that the azure dollarbird (Eurystomus azureus) of the North Moluccas was nested in a clade containing subspecies of the Oriental dollarbird. Formerly, some authorities have considered the azure dollarbird to have been another subspecies of the oriental dollarbird.

=== Subspecies ===
Ten subspecies are recognised:

- E. o. cyanocollis – Vieillot, 1819. Found from the Himalayas through China to south-eastern Siberia, Korea and Japan
- E. o. orientalis – (Linnaeus, 1766). Found from southeastern India to Indochina, the Malay Peninsula, Sumatra, Java, Borneo and the Philippines
- E. o. laetior – Sharpe, 1890. Found in the Western Ghats of southwestern India
- E. o. gigas – Stresemann, 1913. Found on southern Andaman Islands
- E. o. irisi – Deraniyagala, 1951. Found in Sri Lanka
- E. o. oberholseri – Junge, 1936. Found on Simeulue (off north-western Sumatra)
- E. o. pacificus – (Latham, 1801). Originally described as a separate species in the genus Coracias. Found on the Lesser Sunda Islands, and northern and eastern Australia
- E. o. waigiouensis – Elliot, DG, 1871. Originally described as a separate species. Found on New Guinea, western Papuan islands, D'Entrecasteaux Islands and the Louisiade Archipelago
- E. o. crassirostris – Sclater, PL, 1869. Originally described as a separate species. Found in the Bismarck Archipelago
- E. o. solomonensis – Sharpe, 1890. Originally described as a separate species. Found in the Solomon Islands

== Etymology ==
E. o. pacificus, wing-stretching to show the 'dollar' patch that gives it its name

The generic name derives from Ancient Greek eurustomos 'wide-mouthed' and the specific epithet is Latin orientalis 'eastern'.

The name "dollarbird" is from the round bluish-white patch on the wing, visible in flight or when stretching its wings, "said to resemble a silver dollar" (coin).

Alternative names for the oriental dollarbird include the Asian dollarbird, Australian roller (E. o. pacificus), dark roller, dollar roller, dollarbird, eastern broad-billed roller and oriental broad-billed roller.

== Description ==
The oriental dollarbird 27–32 cm long. It is dark brown but this is heavily washed with a bluish-green sheen on the back and wing coverts. Its belly and undertail coverts are light coloured, and it has glossy bright blue colouring on its throat and undertail. Its flight feathers are a darker blue. Its bill is short and wide and in mature animals is coloured orange-red with a black tip. It has very light blue-white patches on the outer parts of its wings which are highly visible in flight. The females are slightly duller than the males but overall the two are very similar. Immature birds are much duller than the adults and do not have the blue colouring on their throats. They also have dark blackish-grey to brown bills and feet instead of the red of the adults.

== Distribution and habitat ==
The oriental dollarbird is found from Australia to Japan and India. At least two subspecies (E. o. cyanocollis and E. o. pacificus) are migratory; the former breeds in northeastern Asia and winters southeastern Asia, and the latter in northern and eastern Australia between the months of September and April and winters in New Guinea and nearby islands. The birds prefer open wooded areas with hole-bearing trees to build nests in.

== Behaviour and ecology ==
The oriental dollarbird is most commonly seen singly with a distinctive upright silhouette on a bare branch high in a tree, from which it hawks for flying insects, often returning to the same perch after a few seconds.

== Gallery ==
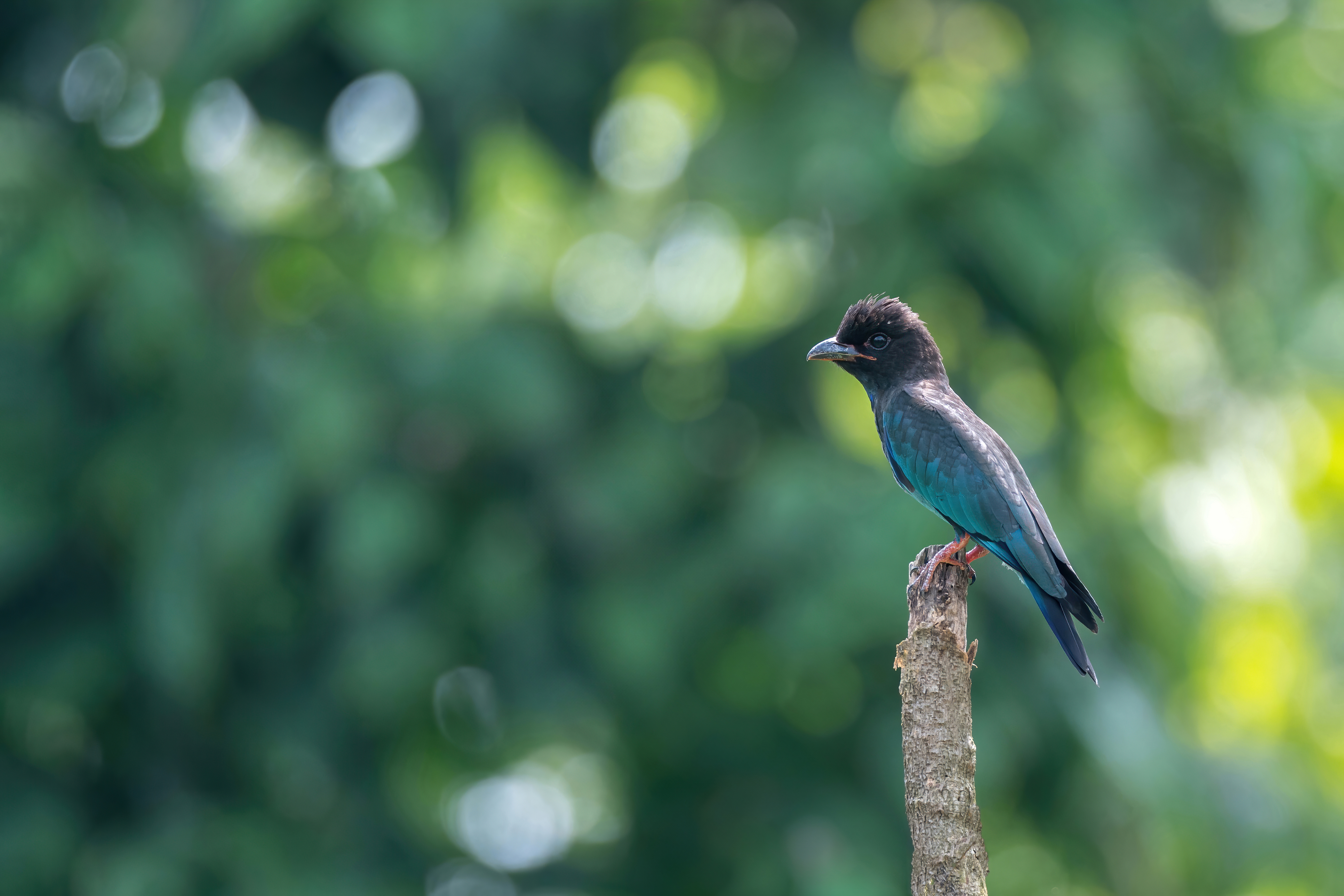
E. o. cyanocollis, juvenile with dull bill, at Rangapur near Dhansar River, Nepal

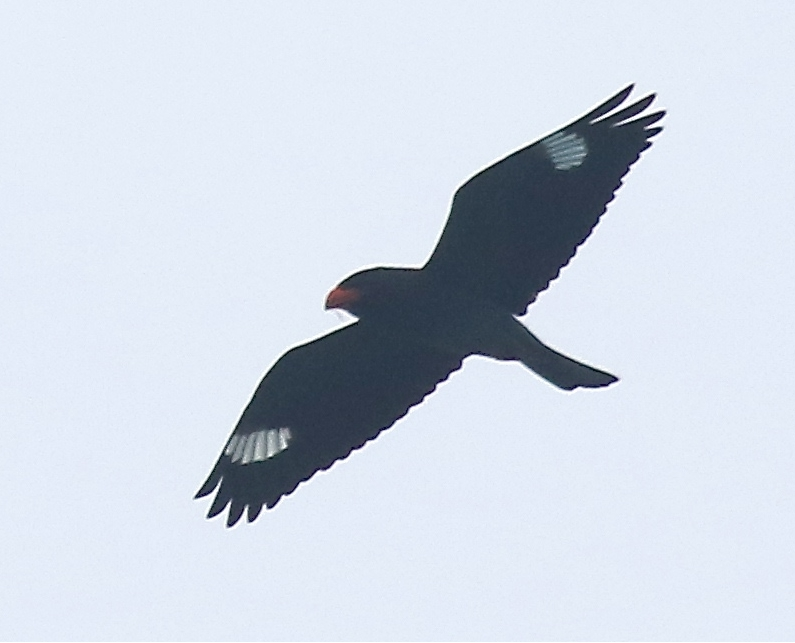
Kaeng Krachan Nat'l Park - Thailand

E. o. pacificus pair, Rush Creek, SE Queensland, Australia

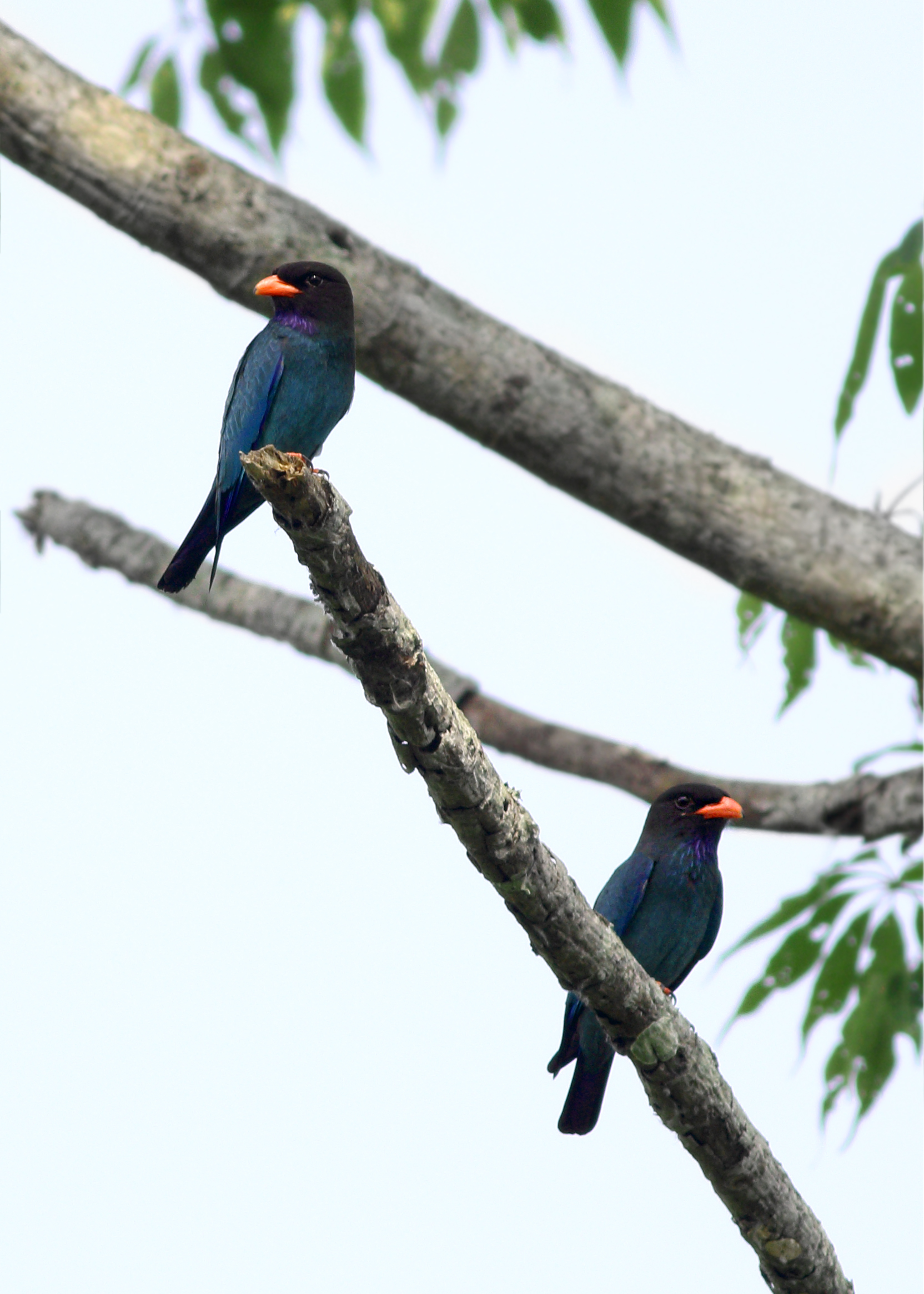
A pair of E. o. cyanocollis from Manas, Assam, India.

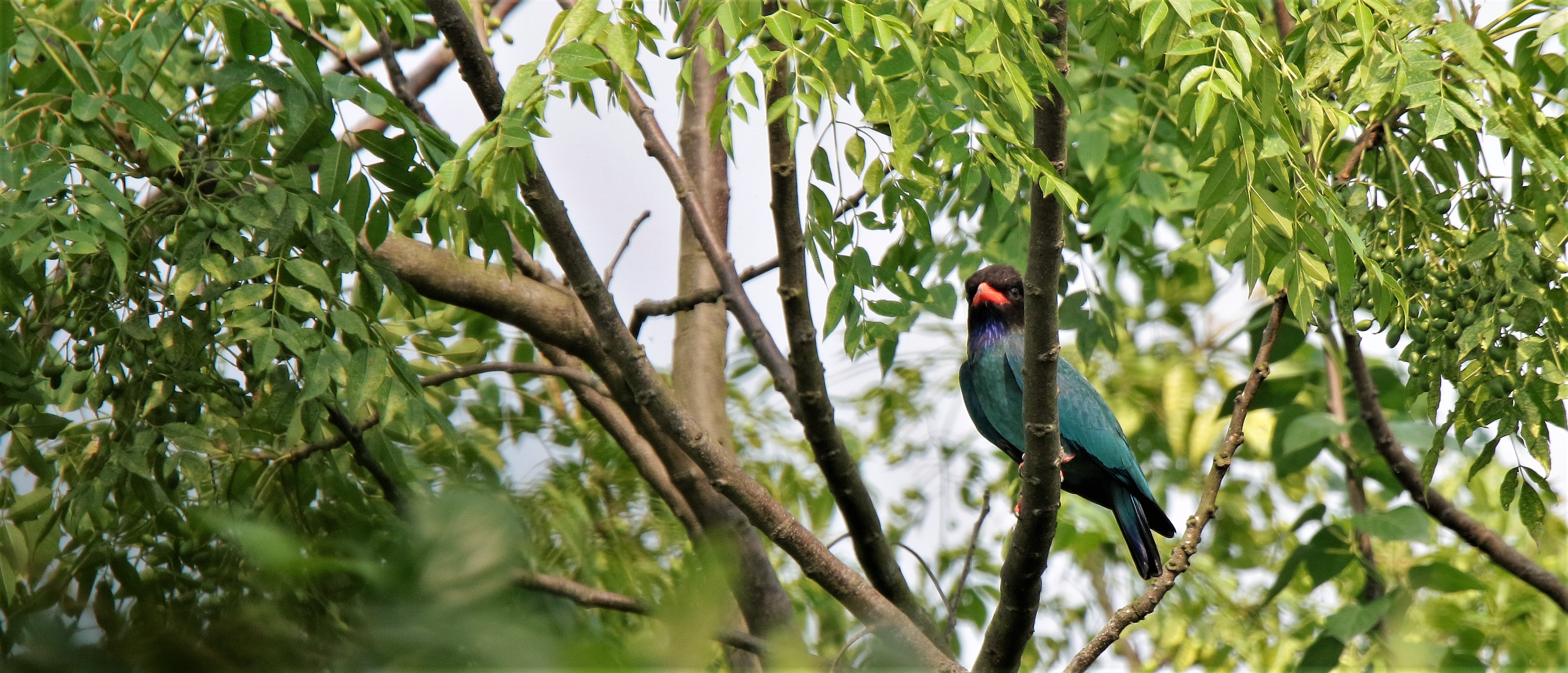
E. o. orientalis, Vietnam

E. o. gigas, Andaman Islands, India

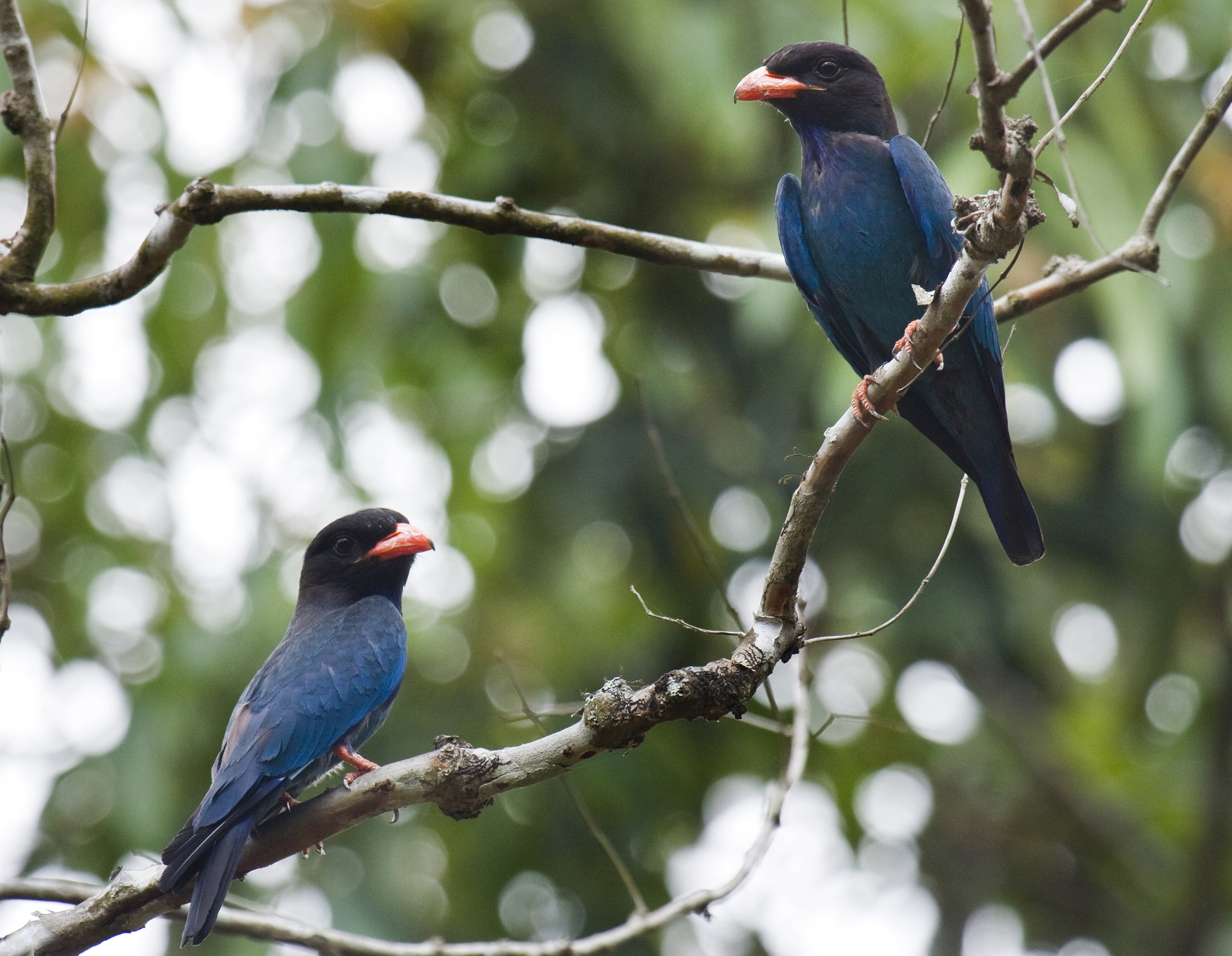
E. o. laetior pair, in Kerala, India
