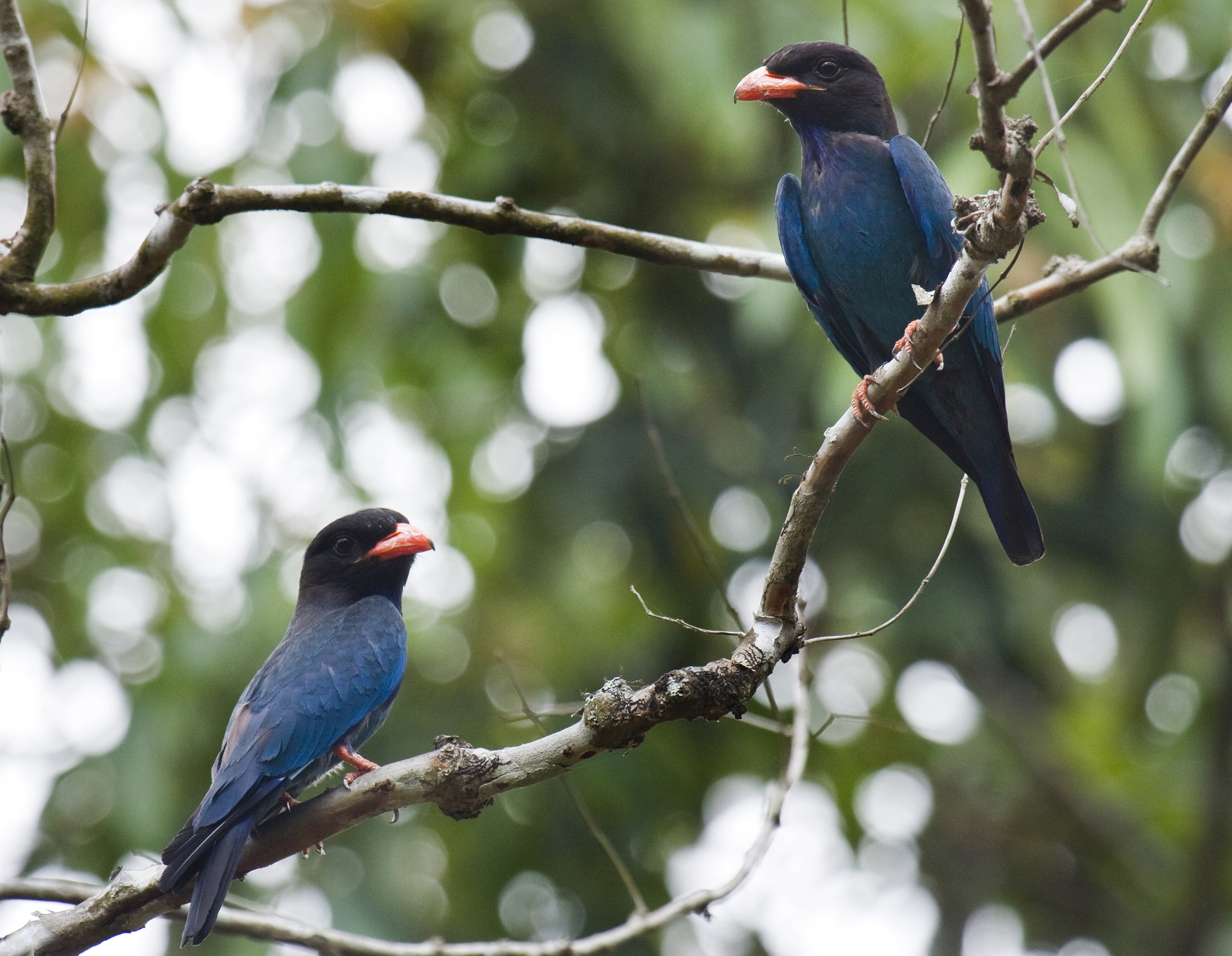
- Dollarbirds in India

Scientific classification
- Kingdom: Animalia
- Phylum: Chordata
- Class: Aves
- Order: Coraciiformes
- Family: Coraciidae
- Genus: Eurystomus; Vieillot, 1816

Type species
- Eurystomus orientalis Linnaeus, 1766

Species
- See text.

= Eurystomus =

Genus of birds

Eurystomus is a genus of roller, one of the two genera in that family of birds. The name means ‘broad mouth’, from the Greek eurus (εὐρύς, ‘broad, wide’) and stoma (στόμα, ‘mouth’).

Eurystomus contains four broad-billed species, which breed in Africa, Asia and Australasia. Two species are restricted to Africa, one of which, the broad-billed roller, is migratory. The oriental dollarbird has a large distribution ranging from India to Japan and Australia and it too, is migratory over the northern and southern extremes of its range. The final species, the azure dollarbird, is endemic to the Moluccas in Indonesia. In general they are open country foragers, occurring in woodland, savanna and farmland. The azure dollarbird and the broad-billed roller are both associated with rainforests but nevertheless require open areas in which to forage.

The species of the genus Eurystomus vary from the other genus of rollers, Coracias, in having proportionally longer wings and shorter legs. These morphological differences are reflected in differences of foraging techniques. Coracias rollers forage from a fixed perch and take prey by swooping down onto it on the ground, while the faster and more agile Eurystomus rollers catch their prey on the wing. Unlike the species of the genus Coracias, they do not perform the "rolling" display which gives the family its common name.

== Taxonomy ==
The genus Eurystomus was introduced in 1816 by the French ornithologist Louis Pierre Vieillot to accommodate the Oriental dollarbird. The name is from Classical Greek eurustomos meaning "wide-mouthed".

A molecular phylogenetic study by Ulf Johansson and collaborators published in 2018 found that the azure dollarbird (Eurystomus azureus) was nested in a clade containing subspecies of the Oriental dollarbird (Eurystomus orientalis).

- Eurystomus
  - - Broad-billed roller – E. glaucurus
    - Blue-throated roller – E. gularis
  - - Oriental dollarbird – E. orientalis orientalis
    - - Azure dollarbird – E. azureus
      - - Oriental dollarbird – E. orientalis pacificus
        - Oriental dollarbird – E. orientalis waigiouensis

== Species ==
Image	Scientific name	Common name	Distribution
	Eurystomus gularis	Blue-throated roller	western sub-Saharan Africa from Guinea to Cameroon, south to northern Angola, and west to south-eastern Uganda
	Eurystomus glaucurus	Broad-billed roller	tropical Africa and Madagascar
	Eurystomus orientalis	Oriental dollarbird	Australia to Japan and India.
	Eurystomus azureus	Azure dollarbird	Maluku Islands in Indonesia
