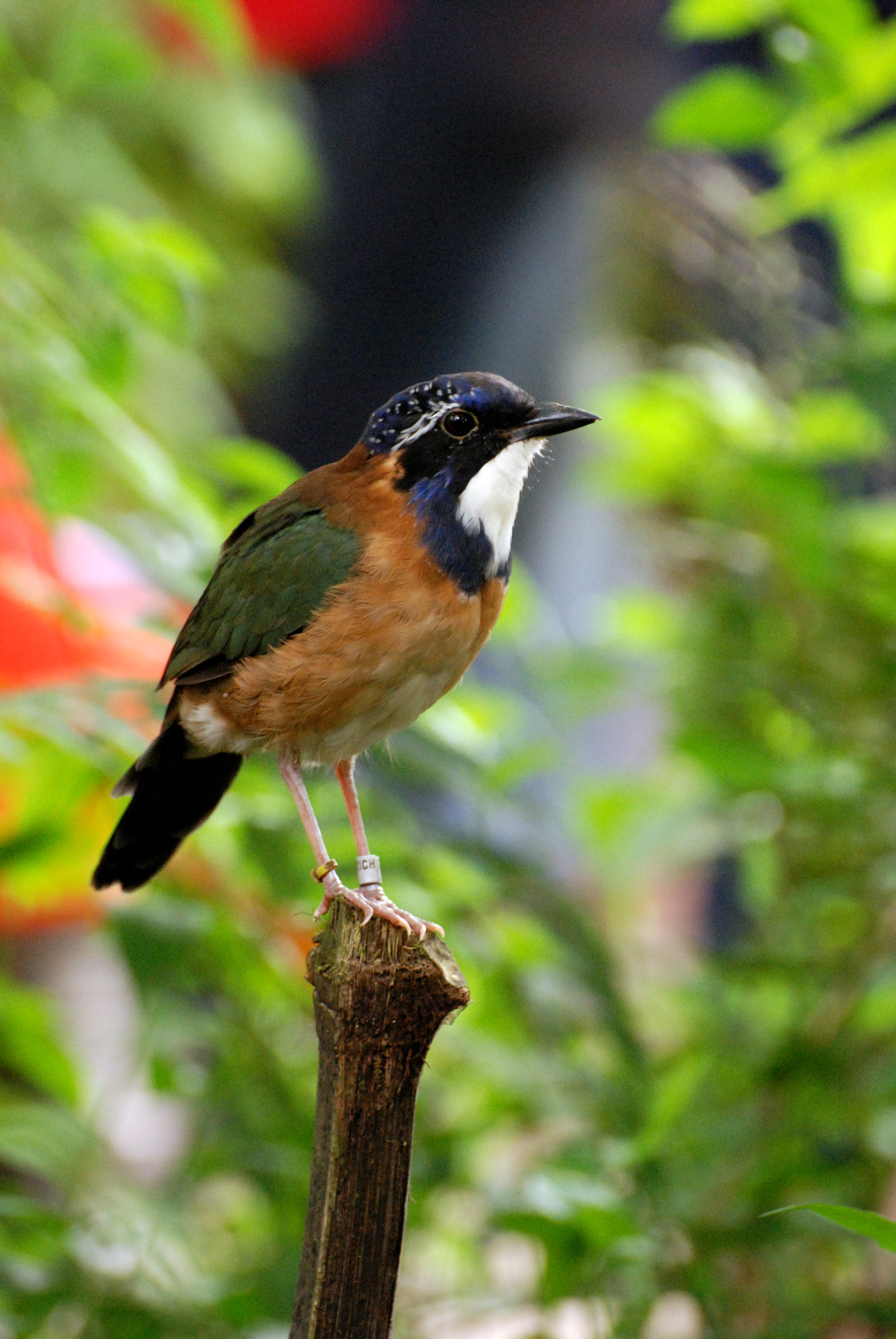
- At Zurich Zoologischer Garten, Switzerland

Conservation status
- Least Concern (IUCN 3.1)

Scientific classification
- Kingdom: Animalia
- Phylum: Chordata
- Class: Aves
- Order: Coraciiformes
- Family: Brachypteraciidae
- Genus: Atelornis
- Species: A. pittoides

Binomial name
- Atelornis pittoides (Lafresnaye, 1834)

= Pitta-like ground roller =

Species of bird

The pitta-like ground roller (Atelornis pittoides) is a species of bird in the ground roller family Brachypteraciidae. The species is monotypic, having no subspecies. It is endemic to Madagascar.

The species was described by Frédéric de Lafresnaye in 1834. The specific name pittoides is a reference to its resemblance to the pittas, an unrelated family of passerine birds.

== Description ==
The pitta-like ground roller is a small and slender member of the family, 25 to 29 cm (9.8–11.4 in) long and weighing 74–114 g (2.6–4.0 oz). It has a cobalt-blue head with a black mask and a white supercilium and throat, which is bordered in blue. The upperparts are bronzy green and the belly is white with buff flanks, and the breast and back have a rufous band.

== Distribution and habitat ==
The pitta-like ground roller is endemic to the eastern half of Madagascar, from the extreme north to the southern edge, and has the widest distribution of any member of the family. It also has a wider range of habitats that it is prepared to occupy, being found in all natural rainforest types on the island from sea-level to 2,000 m (6,600 ft), although it is commonest between 800–1,600 m (2,600–5,200 ft). It can also appear in smaller numbers in degraded secondary forest. It is generally non-migratory but changes in numbers linked to the weather have been noted so some undescribed movements may be happening.

== Behaviour ==
The pitta-like ground roller is terrestrial and feeds on the ground, taking a range of prey, particularly insects such as ants, beetles, cockroaches and butterflies. It also takes worms and small reptiles such as chameleons and frogs. It hunts by standing motionless and watching, followed by short runs to take a new position. Once prey is located it sallies or runs towards it to take it.

The pitta-like ground roller is a seasonal breeder, with most activity happening between October and February. It nests in a cavity dug into an earth bank, usually 50 to 100 cm (20–39 in) deep, which ends in a chamber 20 cm (7.9 in) in diameter. The female incubates the two to four shiny white eggs alone, although the male may feed her during the incubation period. Both parents feed the chicks.
