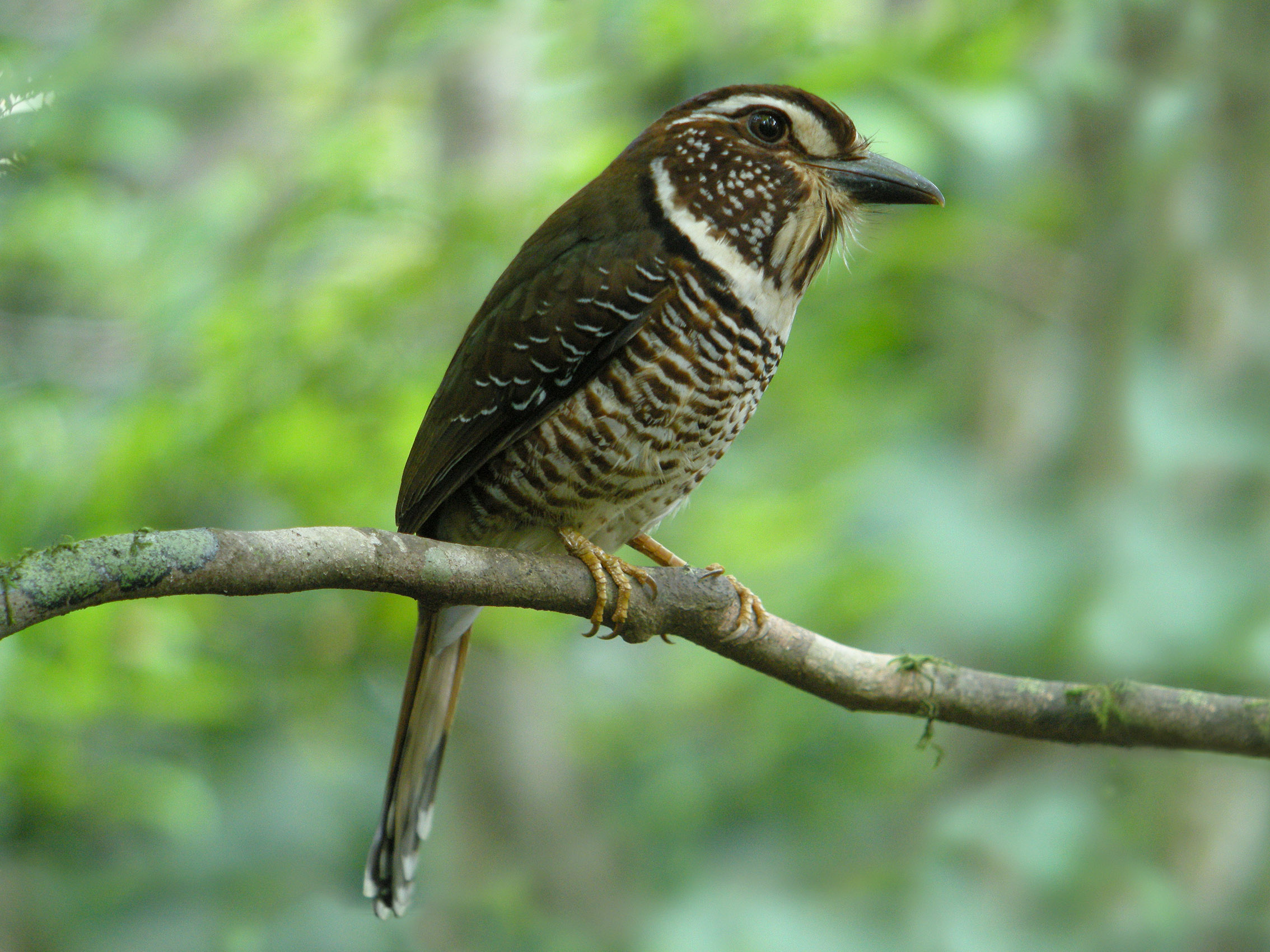
- Short-legged ground roller (Brachypteracias leptosomus)

Scientific classification
- Kingdom: Animalia
- Phylum: Chordata
- Class: Aves
- Order: Coraciiformes
- Family: Brachypteraciidae
- Genus: Brachypteracias; Lafresnaye, 1834

= Brachypteracias =

Genus of birds

Brachypteracias is a small genus of birds in the ground-roller family Brachypteraciidae. The genus is endemic to Madagascar.

== Species ==
There are two species:

Image	Scientific name	Common name	Distribution
	†Brachypteracias langrandi — Goodman, 2000	Ampoza ground roller	Madagascar.
	Brachypteracias leptosomus — (Lesson, 1833)	Short-legged ground roller	Madagascar.
