= Ampoza ground roller =

Ampoza ground roller Temporal range: Holocene

Scientific classification
- Domain: Eukaryota
- Kingdom: Animalia
- Phylum: Chordata
- Class: Aves
- Order: Coraciiformes
- Family: Brachypteraciidae
- Genus: Brachypteracias
- Species: †B. langrandi

Binomial name
- †Brachypteracias langrandi Goodman, 2000

Extinct species of bird

The Ampoza ground roller (Brachypteracias langrandi) was a species of bird in the ground roller family Brachypteraciidae. It is known only from a single humerus fossil discovered in 1929 in southwest Madagascar. Little is known about the species, but it is suggested that the bird's habitat becoming more arid was a contributing factor in its demise.

== Taxonomy and systematics ==
The genus name is derived from the Ancient Greek brakhupteros, meaning short-winged. The species was named in honour of Olivier Langrand, an ornithologist who had worked in Madagascar.
