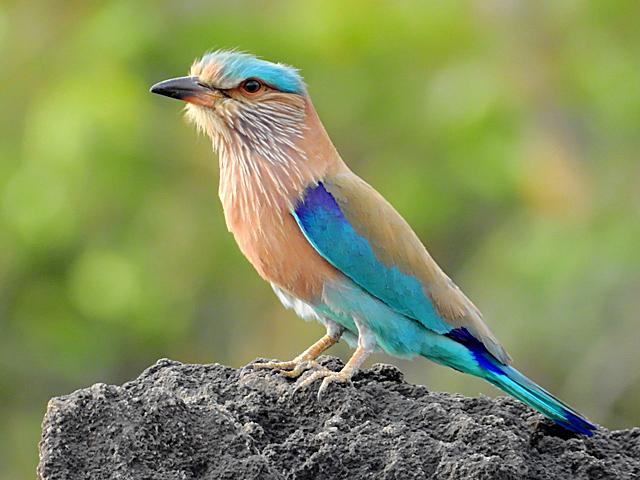
- Indian roller from Maharashtra, India

Scientific classification
- Kingdom: Animalia
- Phylum: Chordata
- Class: Aves
- Order: Coraciiformes
- Family: Coraciidae; Rafinesque, 1815

Genera
- Coracias; Eurystomus

= Coraciidae =

Rollers

Family of birds

Coraciidae (/kɒrəˈsaɪ.ɪdiː/) is a family of Old World birds, which are known as rollers because of the aerial acrobatics some of these birds perform during courtship or territorial flights. The family contains 13 species and is divided into two genera. Rollers resemble crows in size and build, and share the colourful appearance of kingfishers and bee-eaters, blues and pinkish or cinnamon browns predominating. The two inner front toes are connected, but not the outer one.

They are mainly insect eaters, with Eurystomus species taking their prey on the wing, and those of the genus Coracias diving from a perch to catch food items from on the ground, like giant shrikes.

Although living rollers are birds of warm climates in the Old World, fossil records show that rollers were present in North America during the Eocene. They are monogamous and nest in an unlined hole in a tree or in masonry, and lay 2–4 eggs in the tropics, 3–6 at higher latitudes. The eggs, which are white, hatch after 17–20 days, and the young remain in the nest for approximately another 30 days.

== Taxonomy and systematics ==
The roller family Coraciidae was introduced (as Coracinia) by the French polymath Constantine Samuel Rafinesque in 1815.

It is one of six families in the order Coraciiformes, which also includes the motmots, bee-eaters, todies, ground rollers, and kingfishers. The family gets its scientific name for Latin coracium, "like a raven", and the English name "roller" from the aerial acrobatics some of these birds perform during courtship or territorial flights.

The phylogenetic relationship between the six families that make up the order Coraciiformes is shown in the cladogram below. The number of species in each family is taken from the list maintained by Frank Gill, Pamela C. Rasmussen and David Donsker on behalf of the International Ornithological Committee (IOC).

- Coraciiformes
  - - Meropidae – bee-eaters (31 species)
    - - Brachypteraciidae – ground rollers (5 species)
      - Coraciidae – rollers (13 species)
  - - Todidae – todies (5 species)
    - - Momotidae – motmots (14 species)
      - Alcedinidae – kingfishers (118 species)

A molecular phylogenetic study by Ulf Johansson and collaborators published in 2018 found that the azure dollarbird (Eurystomus azureus) was nested in a clade containing subspecies of the Oriental dollarbird (Eurystomus orientalis).

- Coraciidae
  - Eurystomus
    - - - Broad-billed roller – E. glaucurus
        - Blue-throated roller – E. gularis
      - - Oriental dollarbird – E. orientalis orientalis
        - - Azure dollarbird – E. azureus
          - - Oriental dollarbird – E. orientalis pacificus
            - Oriental dollarbird – E. orientalis waigiouensis
  - Coracias
    - Blue-bellied roller – C. cyanogaster
    - - - Purple roller – C. naevius
        - Racket-tailed roller – C. spatulatus
      - - - Indian roller – C. benghalensis
          - - Indochinese roller – C. affinis
            - Purple-winged roller – C. temminckii
        - - Lilac-breasted roller – C. caudatus
          - - Abyssinian roller – C. abyssinicus
            - European roller – C. garrulus

=== Genera ===
The roller family has two extant genera as follows:

Image	Genus	Living species
	Coracias Linnaeus, 1758	Purple roller (Coracias naevius); Indian roller (Coracias benghalensis); Indochinese roller (Coracias affinis); Purple-winged roller (Coracias temminckii); Racket-tailed roller (Coracias spatulatus); Lilac-breasted roller (Coracias caudatus); Abyssinian roller (Coracias abyssinicus); European roller (Coracias garrulus); Blue-bellied roller (Coracias cyanogaster)
	Eurystomus Vieillot, 1816	Blue-throated roller (Eurystomus gularis); Broad-billed roller (Eurystomus glaucurus); Oriental dollarbird (Eurystomus orientalis); Azure dollarbird (Eurystomus azureus)

== Description ==
Rollers can be identified as medium-sized birds with strong, slightly hooked beaks and stocky bodies, often with brightly colored plumage. Rollers resemble crows in size and build, ranging from 25 to 27 cm (9.8 to 11 in) in length. They share the colourful appearance of kingfishers and bee-eaters, blues and pinkish or cinnamon browns predominating. The rollers are similar in general morphology to their relatives in the order Coraciiformes, having large heads on short necks, bright plumage, weak feet and short legs. The two inner front toes are connected, but not the outer one. The weakness of the feet and legs is reflected in their behaviour: rollers do not hop or move along perches and seldom use their feet other than for occasional lurching leaps along the ground pursuing escaping prey. The bill is robust, and is shorter yet broader in the genus Eurystomus, sometimes known as the broad-billed rollers. The broad-billed rollers have brightly coloured bills, whereas those of the Coracias (or true) rollers are black. Other differences between the two genera are in wing length; the more aerial Eurystomus rollers have longer wings (and shorter feet still) than the Coracias rollers, this reflects differences in their foraging ecology. Their calls are "repeated short, gruff caws".

== Distribution and habitat ==
The rollers are found in warmer parts of the Old World. Africa has most species, and is believed to be where the family originated. This is supported by the fact that the related ground rollers are found on Madagascar. The European roller is completely migratory, breeding in Europe and wintering in Africa, and the dollarbird also leaves much of its breeding range in winter. Other species are sedentary or short-range migrants. These are birds of open habitats with trees or other elevated perches from which to hunt.

== Behavior ==
=== Breeding ===
Rollers are noisy and aggressive when defending their nesting territories, which they patrol while displaying their striking plumage. Intruders are attacked with intimidating rolling dives. They are monogamous and nest in an unlined hole in a tree or in masonry, and lay 2–4 eggs in the tropics, 3–6 at higher latitudes. The eggs, which are white, hatch after 17–20 days, and the young remain in the nest for approximately another 30 days. Egg laying is staggered at one-day intervals so that if food is short only the older larger nestlings get fed. The chicks are naked, blind and helpless when they hatch.

=== Feeding ===
Coracias rollers are watch-and-wait hunters. They sit in a tree or on a post before descending on their prey and carrying it back to a perch in the beak before dismembering it. They take a wide range of terrestrial invertebrates, and small vertebrates such as frogs, lizards, rodents and young birds. They will take items avoided by many other birds, such as hairy caterpillars, insects with warning colouration and snakes.

Eurystomus rollers hunt on the wing, swooping on flying beetles, crickets and other insects which are crushed by their broad deep beaks and eaten on the wing. The azure roller and dollarbird will hunt huge swarms of termites and flying ants which appear after thunderstorms. Tens or hundreds of these rollers may be attracted to large swarms.

== Cited text ==
- Fry, C. Hilary; Fry, Kathie; Harris, Alan (1992). Kingfishers, Bee-eaters and Rollers. Christopher Helm. ISBN 0-7136-8028-8.
