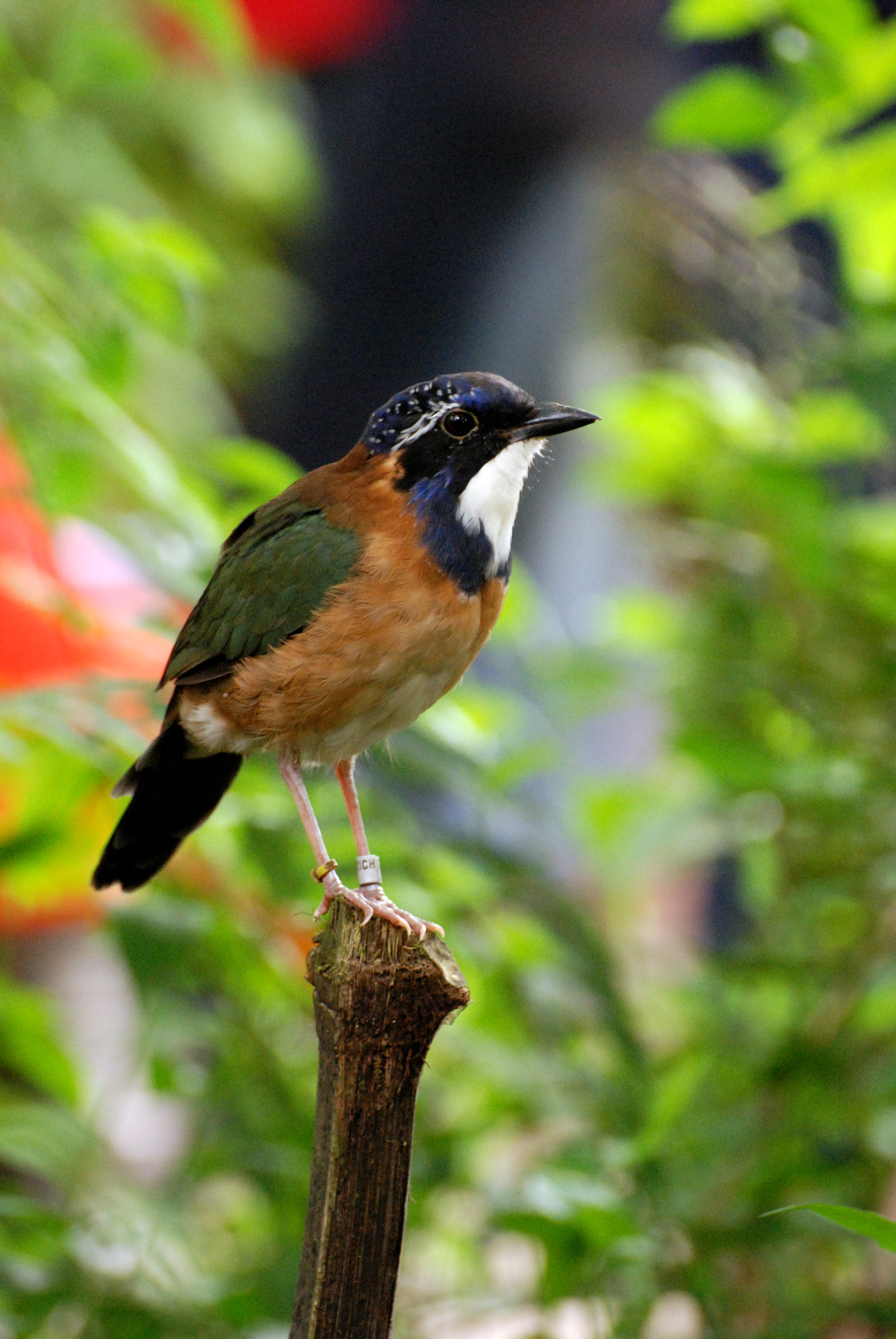
- Pitta-like ground roller

Scientific classification
- Kingdom: Animalia
- Phylum: Chordata
- Class: Aves
- Order: Coraciiformes
- Family: Brachypteraciidae
- Genus: Atelornis; Pucheran, 1846

= Atelornis =

Genus of birds

Atelornis is a small genus of birds in the ground-roller family Brachypteraciidae. The genus is endemic to Madagascar.

== Species ==
There are two species:

Genus Atelornis – Pucheran, 1846 – two species
| Common name | Scientific name and subspecies | Range | Size and ecology | IUCN status and estimated population |
|---|---|---|---|---|
| Rufous-headed ground roller | Atelornis crossleyi Sharpe, 1875 | Madagascar. | Size: Habitat: Diet: | NT |
| Pitta-like ground roller | Atelornis pittoides Lafresnaye, 1834 | Madagascar. | Size: Habitat: Diet: | LC |
