= List of birds of Madagascar =

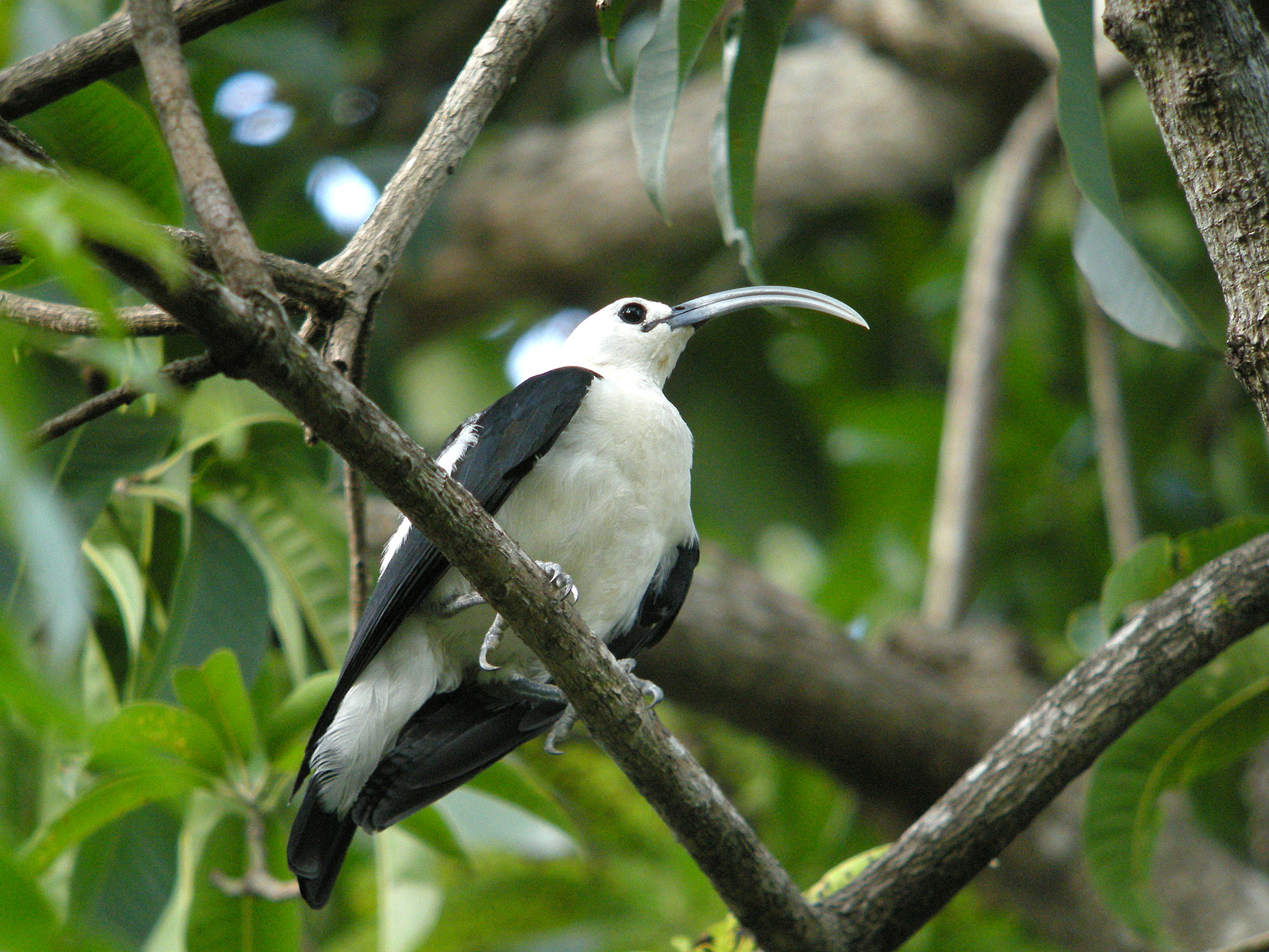
The sickle-billed vanga belongs to the family Vangidae, one of Madagascar's families.

Madagascar is an island nation located off the southeastern coast of Africa. Because of its long separation from neighboring continents—through tectonic movement, it split from Africa about 160 million years ago, and from India around 90 million years ago—it contains many species endemic to the island. Of the 311 bird species recorded on Madagascar, 109 are found nowhere else on earth, and a handful of others are shared only with the neighbouring Comoro Islands, 2 have been declared extinct, 36 are globally threatened, 7 species are introduced by humans.

This list's taxonomic treatment (designation and sequence of orders, families and species) and nomenclature (common and scientific names) follow the conventions of The Clements Checklist of Birds of the World, 2022 edition. The family accounts at the beginning of each heading reflect this taxonomy, as do the species counts found in each family account. Introduced and accidental species are included in the total counts for Madagascar.

Species status comments are taken from Morris and Hawkins's Birds of Madagascar: A Photographic Guide unless otherwise noted. Introduced and accidental species are included in the total counts. The IUCN Red List codes are those given by the International Union for the Conservation of Nature and Natural Resources; they come from the IUCN's Red List website.

== Table legend ==
(*) Species endemic to Madagascar
(%) Species introduced to Madagascar

IUCN Red List codes
Code	Description
CR	Critically endangered
EN	Endangered
EX	Extinct
LC	Least concern
NR	Not recognised as a species by IUCN
NT	Near threatened
VU	Vulnerable

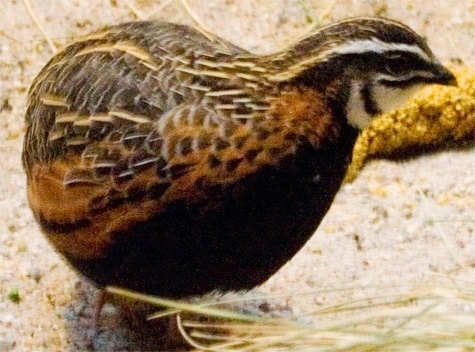
The harlequin quail breeds occasionally in Madagascar.

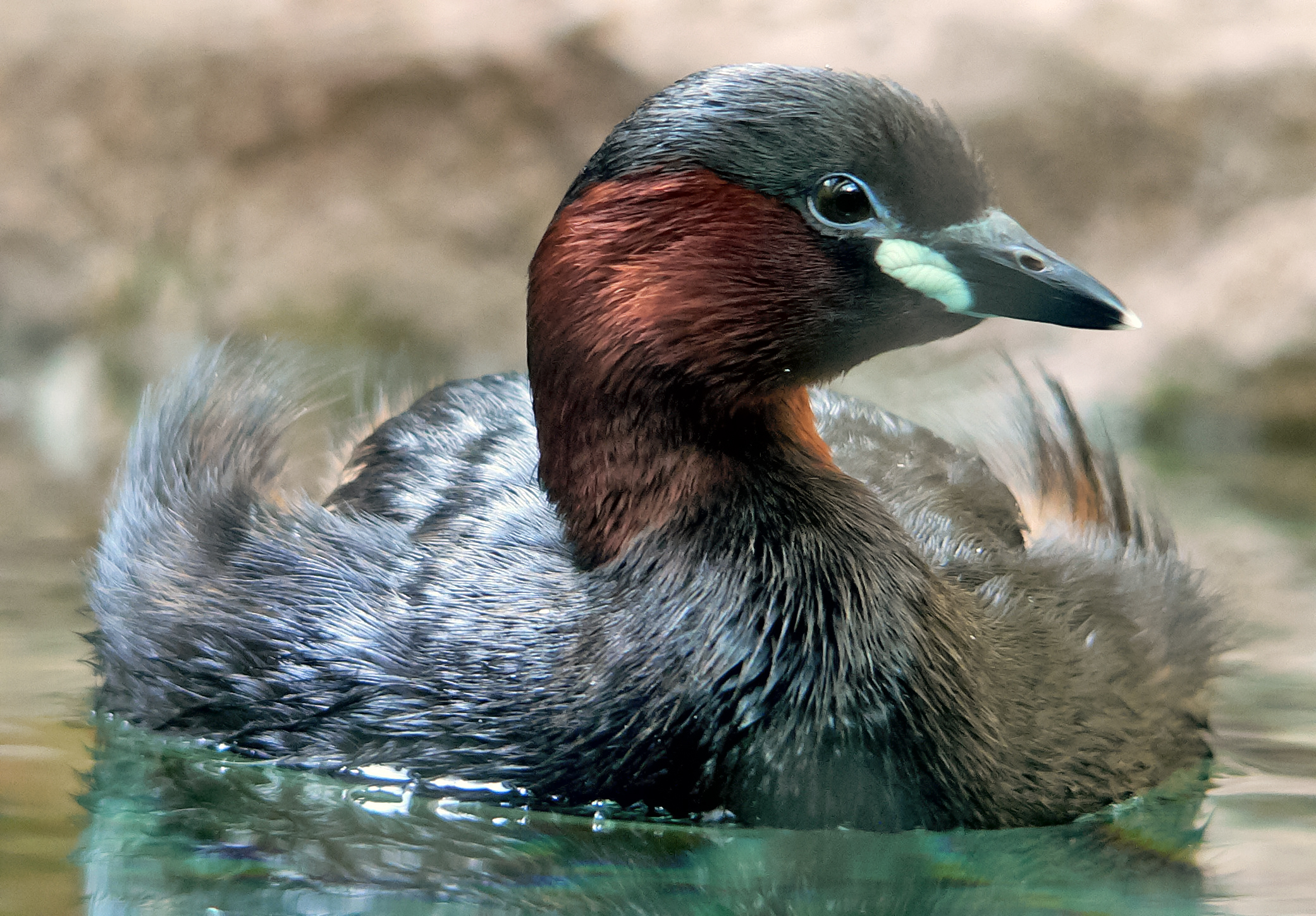
The little grebe is common on fresh and brackish waters, particularly in western wetlands and the northern highlands.

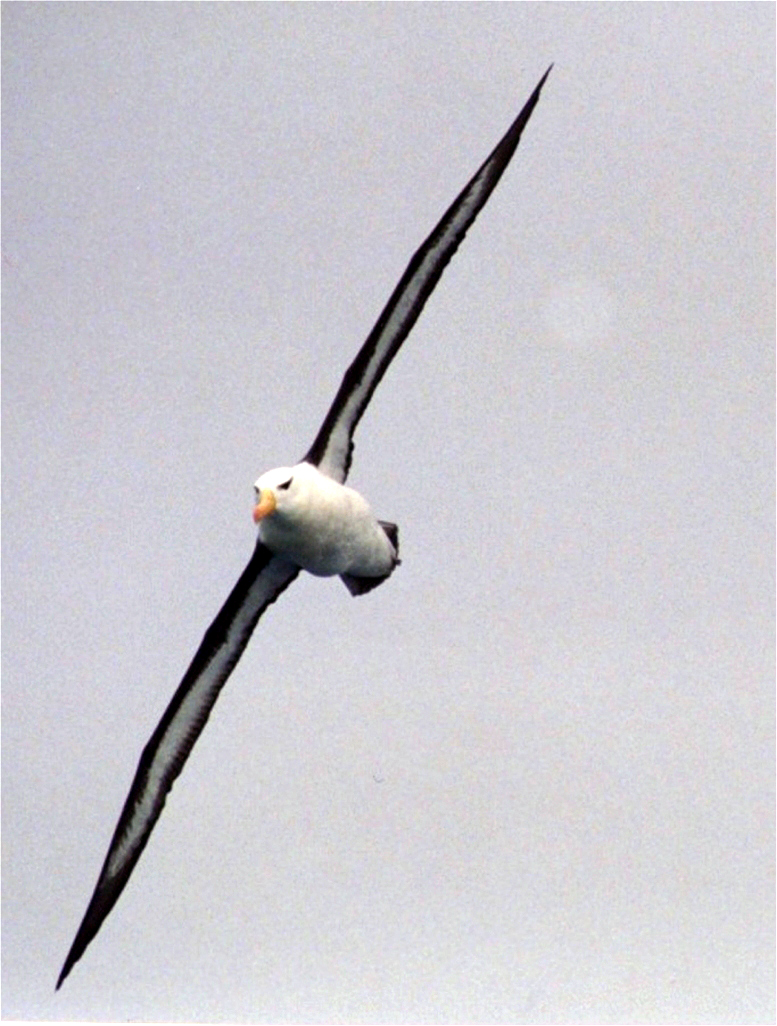
There are few recent records of black-browed albatross, which was formerly frequent in Madagascar waters.

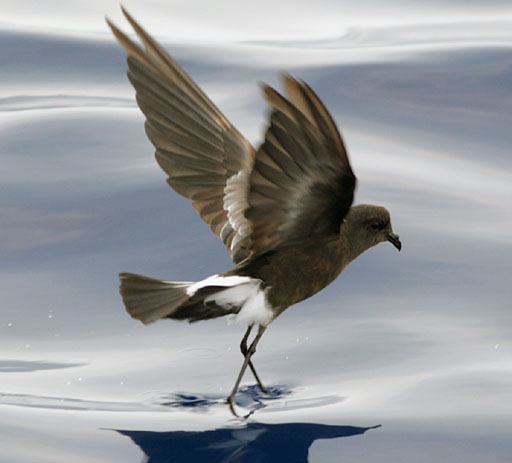
Though not often seen from land, the Wilson's storm petrel is regularly recorded on migration through Malagasy waters, sometimes in large numbers.

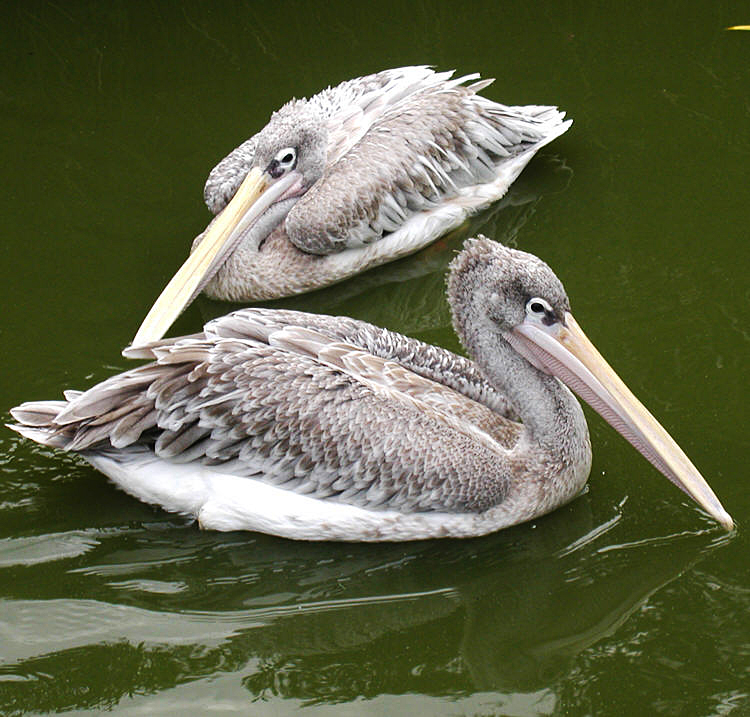
Pink-backed pelicans bred in Madagascar in the late 1950s and early 1960s, but have only been recorded a few times since.

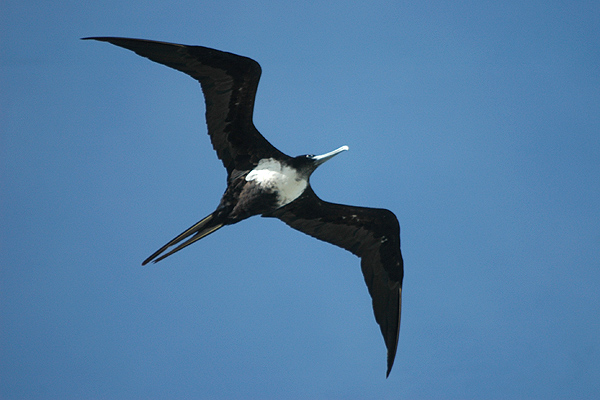
The greater frigatebird is typically found soaring in groups high above the ocean, often in thermals.

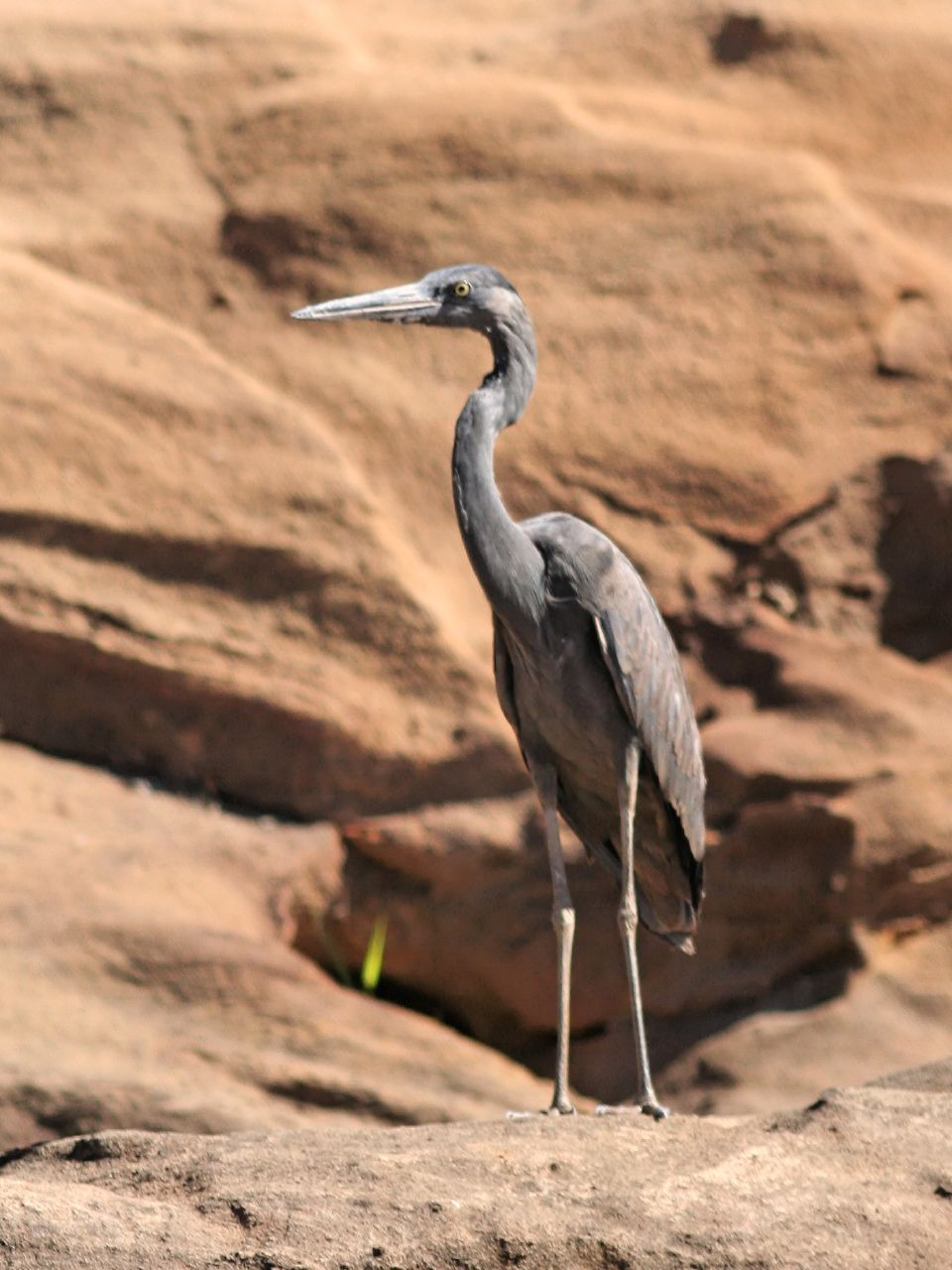
The globally threatened Humblot's heron is endemic to Madagascar, though it may also breed on the Comoros.

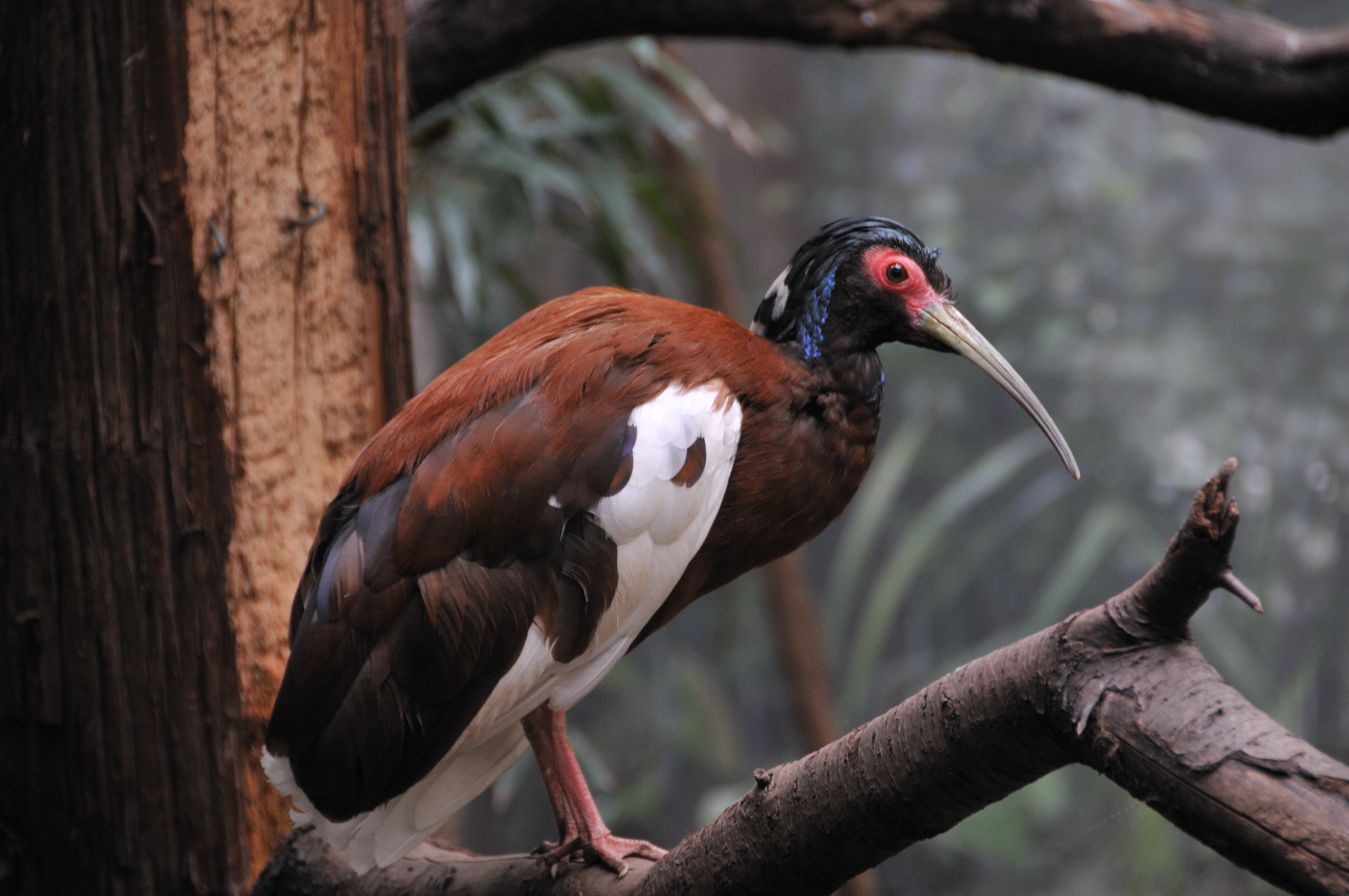
The endemic, forest-dwelling Madagascar ibis is heavily hunted, despite being legally protected.

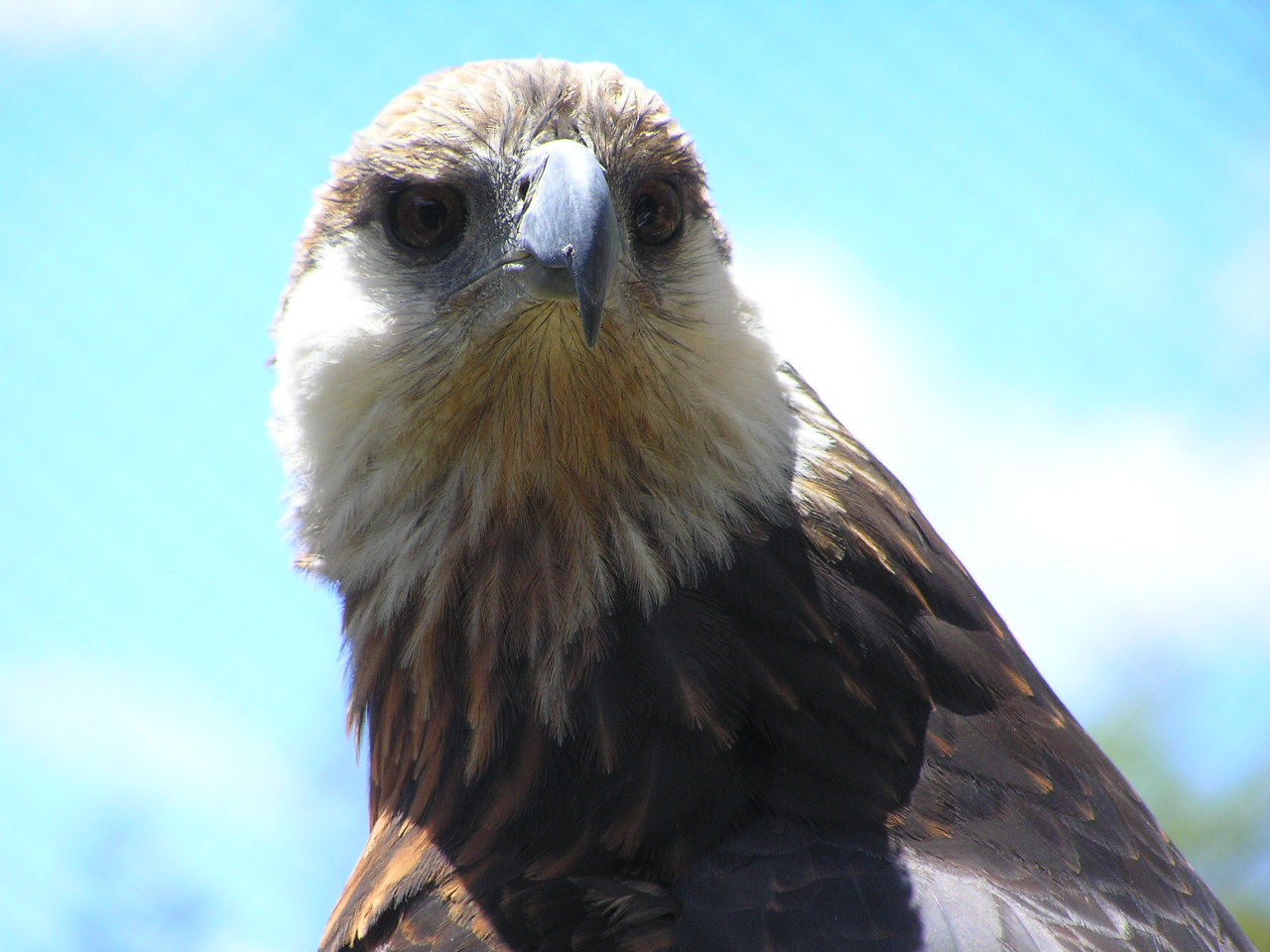
The Madagascar fish eagle is critically endangered, with a breeding population of fewer than 100 pairs.

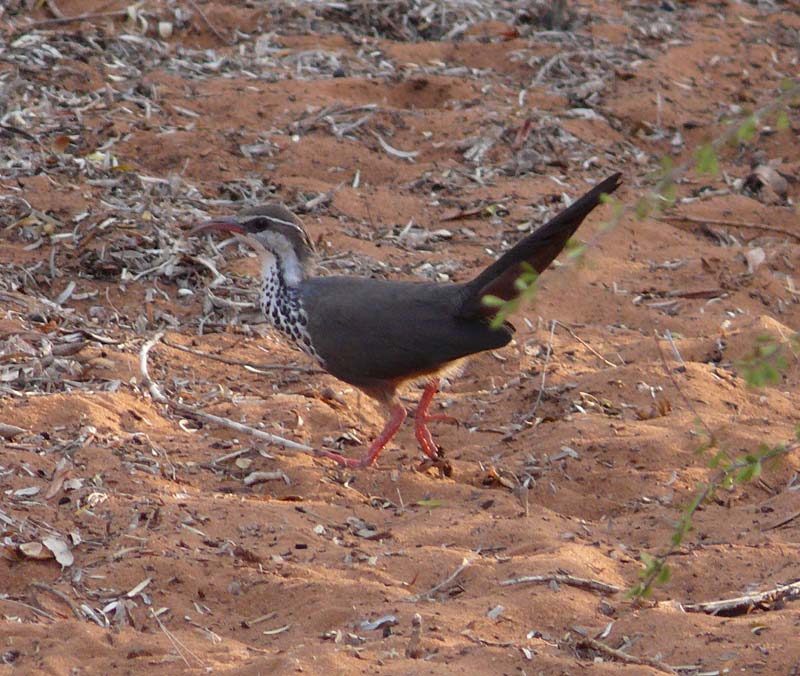
The subdesert mesite is restricted to a coastal strip of dry, spiny forest in southwestern Madagascar.

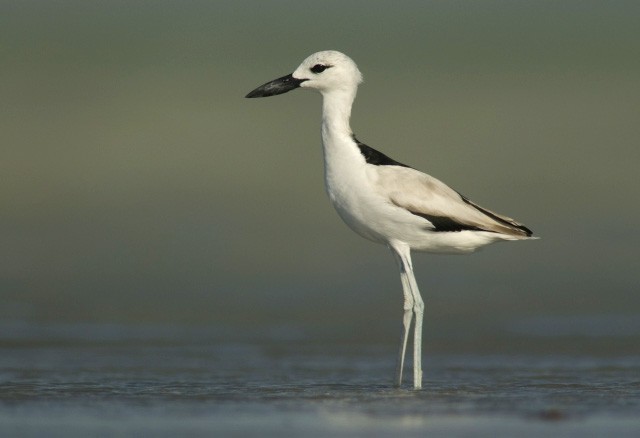
The crab-plover is a common visitor to the island's west coast.

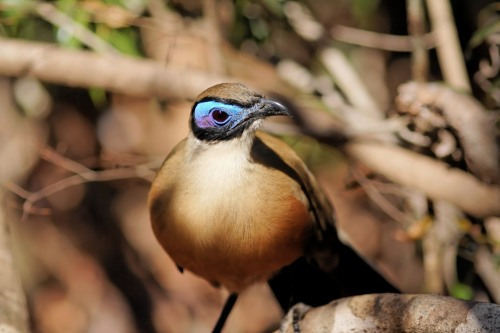
The giant coua feeds on the ground, primarily on insects.

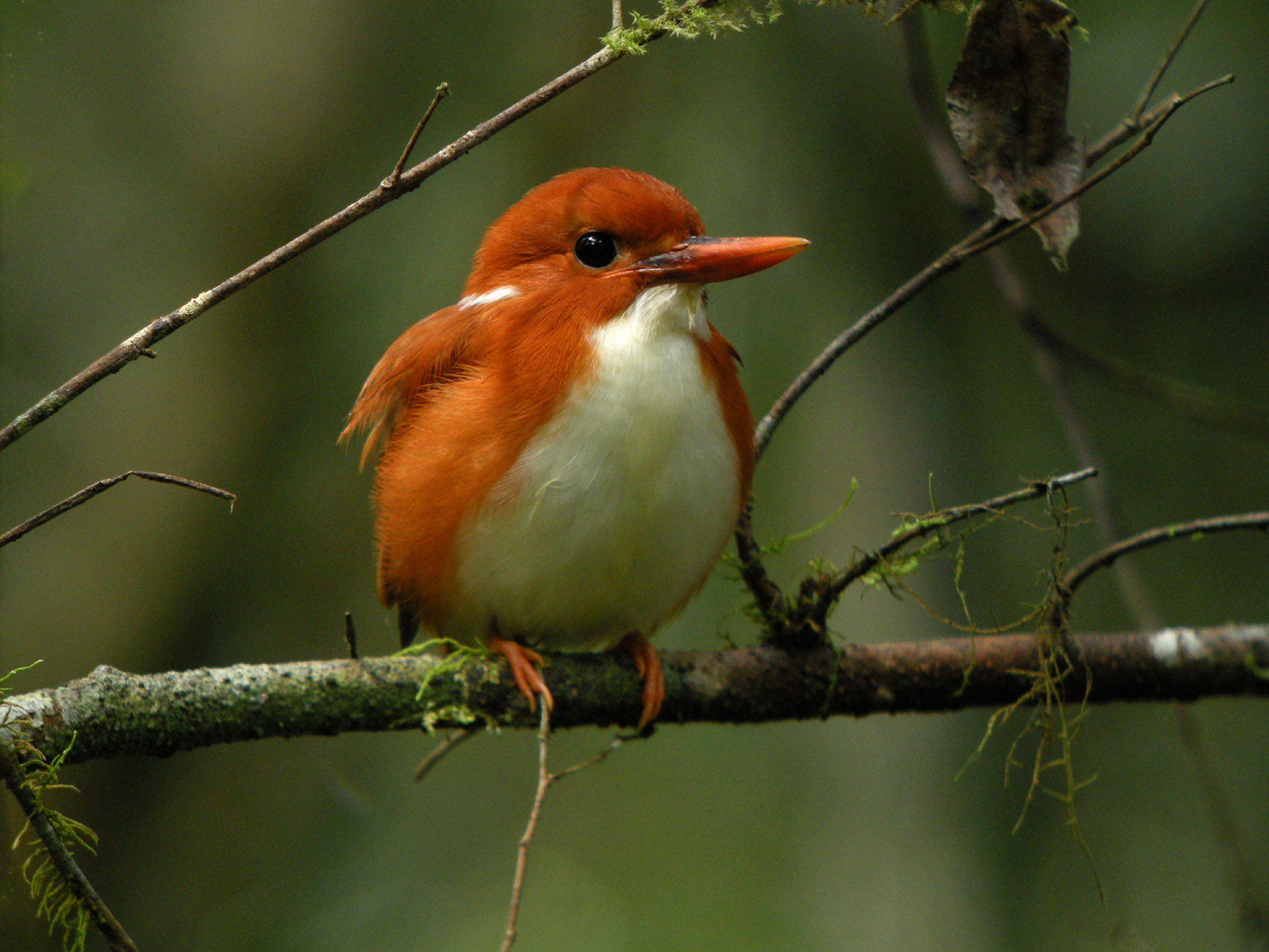
The tiny Madagascar pygmy-kingfisher is found in forests with dense understory.

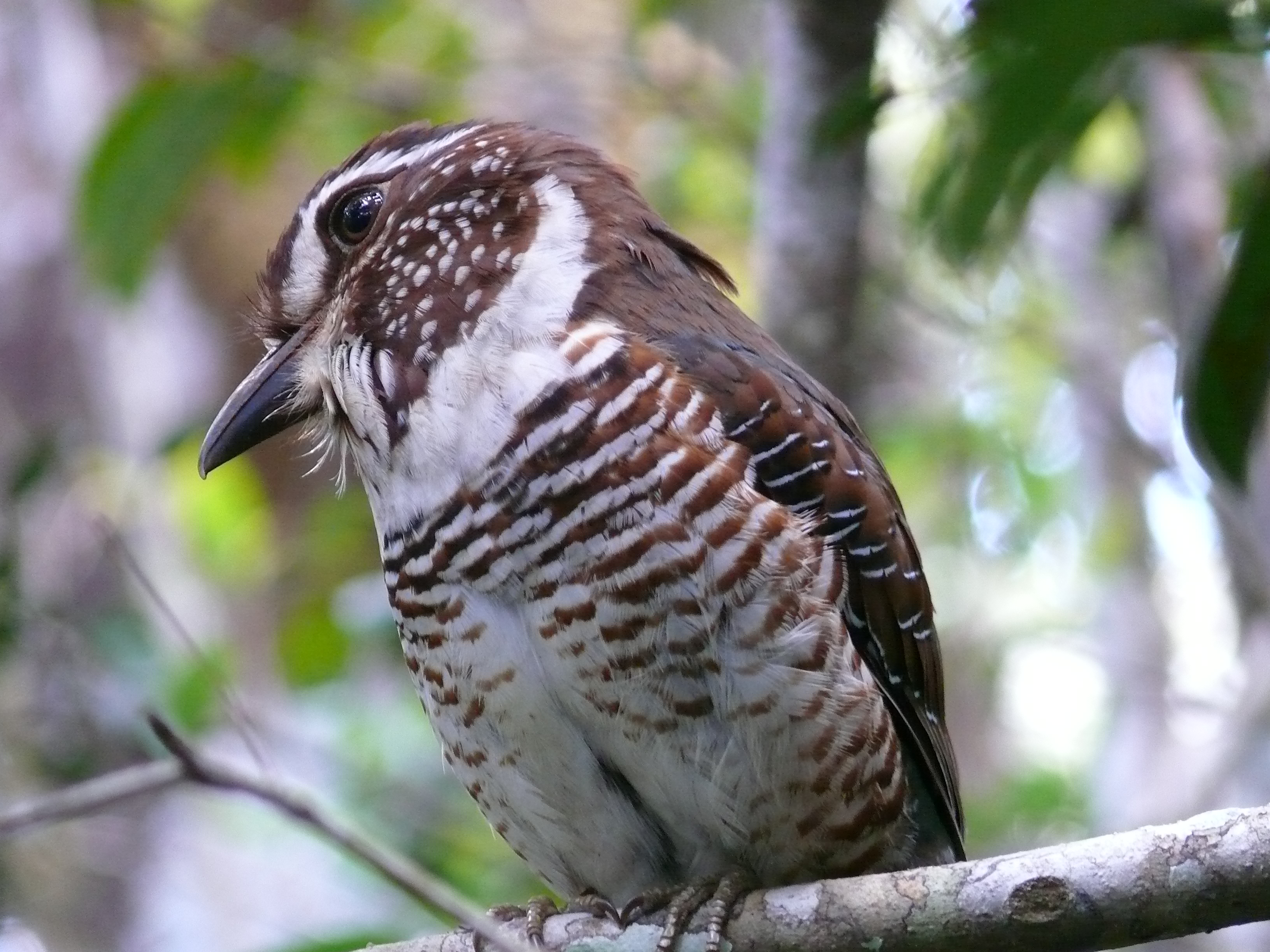
The scarce and secretive short-legged ground roller is threatened by habitat destruction and degradation.

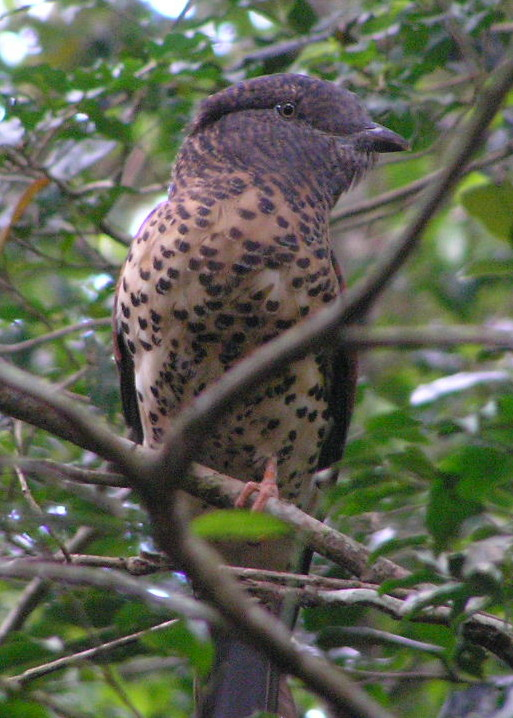
The cuckoo-roller is found in forests and woodlands throughout the island.

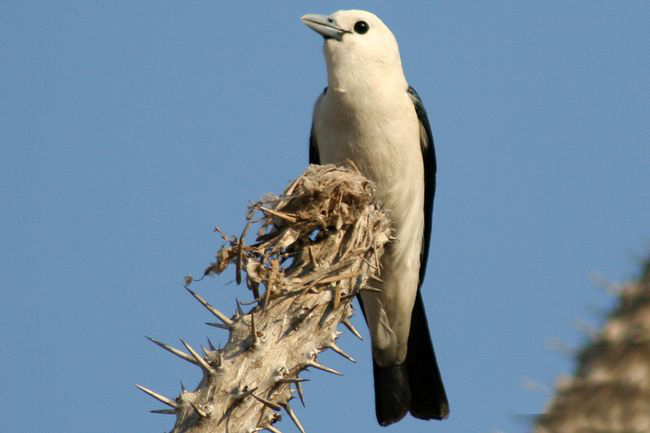
The white-headed vanga is widespread and found in all types of forest.

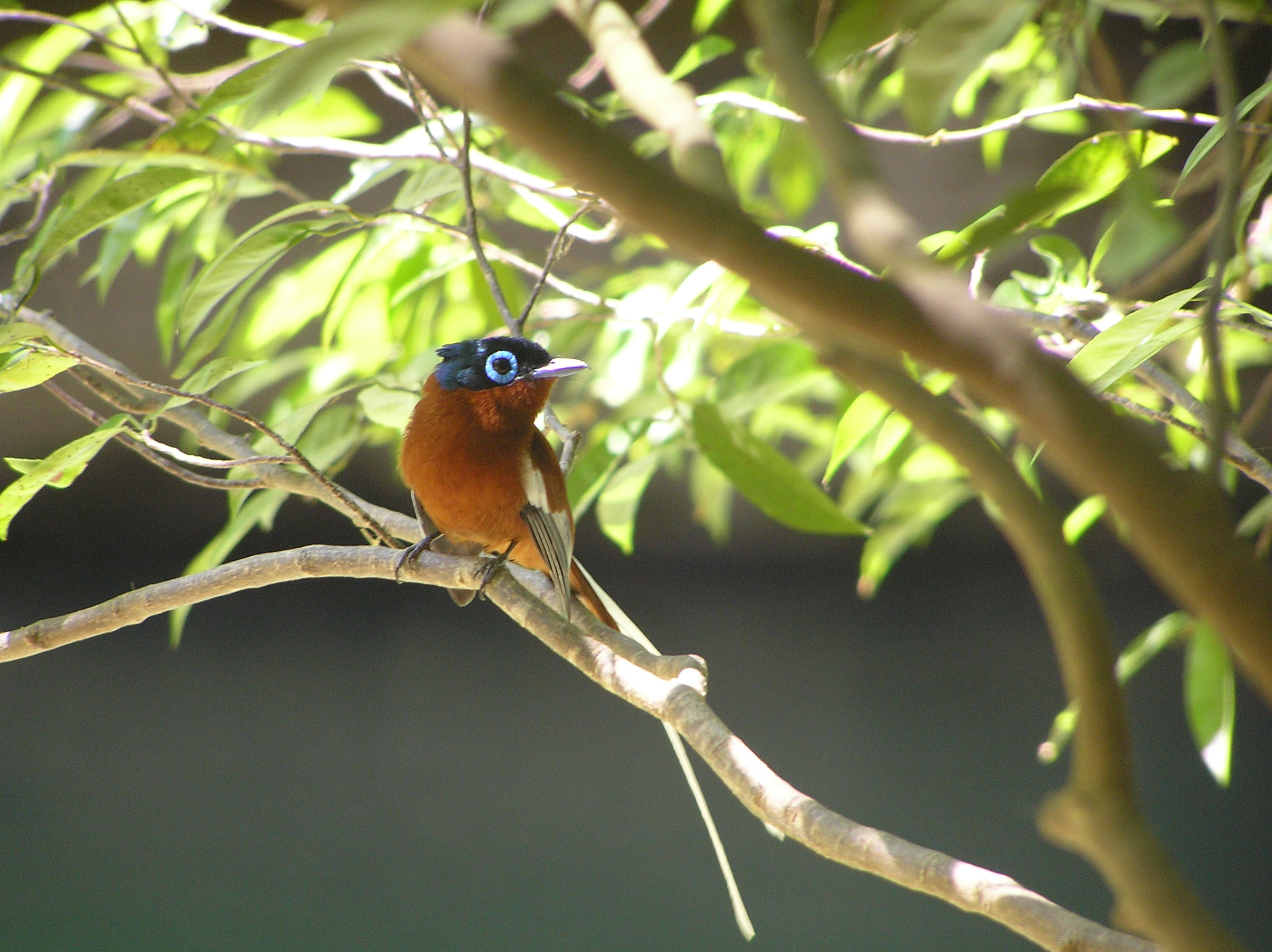
The Malagasy paradise-flycatcher is a regional endemic, found in both Madagascar and the Comoros.

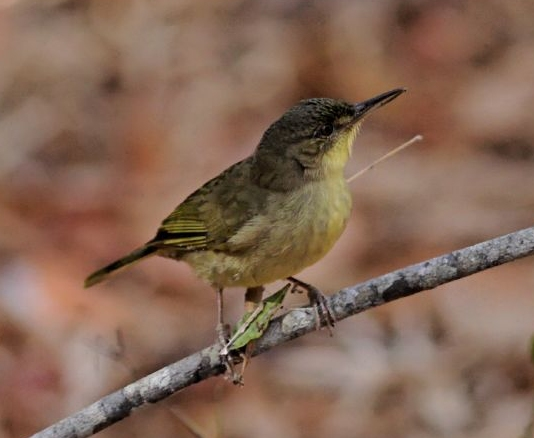
The long-billed bernieria, formerly thought to be a greenbul, is now considered a Malagasy warbler.

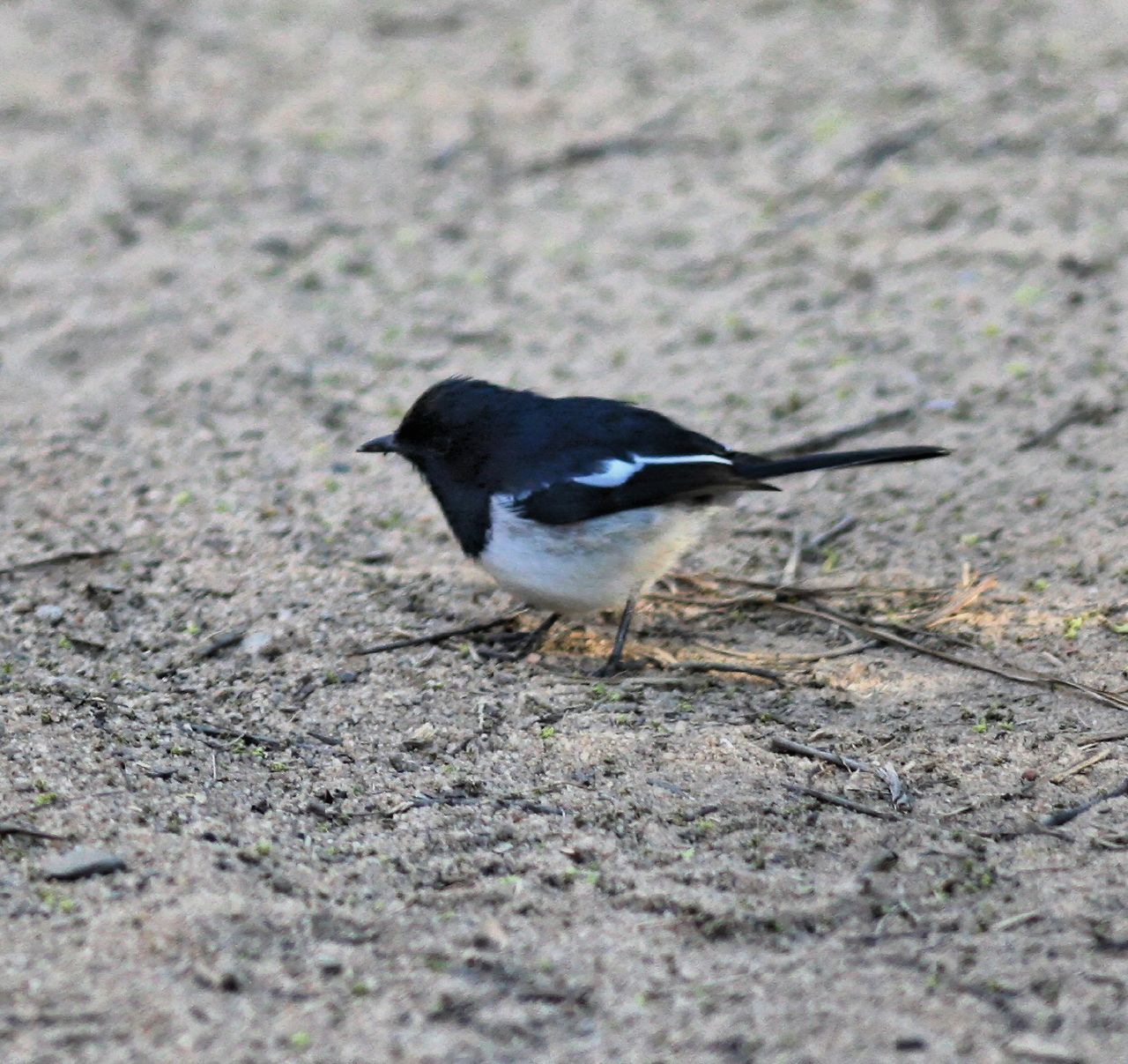
There are multiple subspecies of the endemic Madagascar magpie robin found across the island, differing in the amount of black in the adult male's plumage.

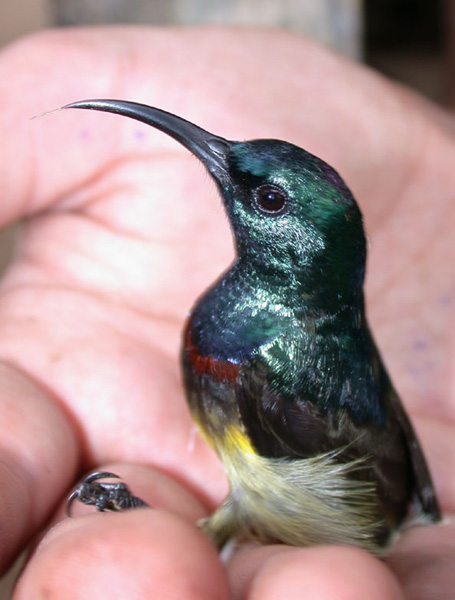
The male souimanga sunbird has iridescent plumage in the breeding season—which is generally from August to January.

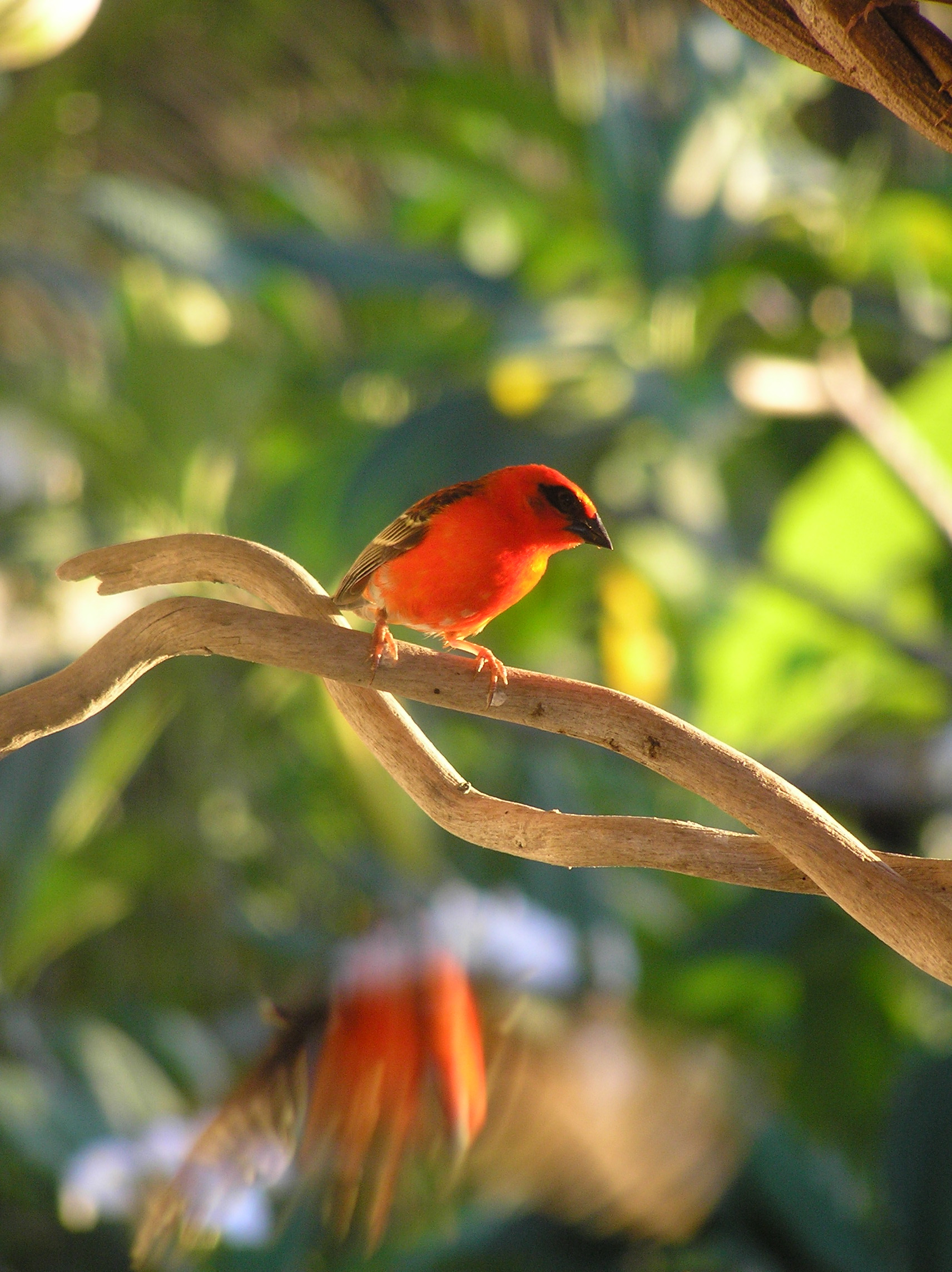
The endemic Madagascar red fody is common and widespread, even in the country's capital, Antananarivo.

== Greater elephant birds ==
Order: Aepyornithiformes Family: Aepyornithidae

Aepyornis is an extinct genus of elephant birds formerly endemic to Madagascar. The genus had two species, the smaller A. hildebrandti and the larger A. maximus, which is possibly the largest bird ever to have lived. Its closest relative is the New Zealand kiwi. They became extinct sometime around 1000 CE, probably as a result of human activity.

Common name	Scientific name	Status	IUCN code
Hildebrandt's elephant bird	Aepyornis hildebrandti	Extinct	EX
Giant elephant bird	Aepyornis maximus	Extinct	EX

== Lesser elephant bird ==
Order: Aepyornithiformes Family: Mullerornithidae

Mullerornis modestus is an extinct species of elephant birds, and the only member of the genus Mullerornis. It is smaller than the more well-known Aepyornis, with a still substantial body mass of approximately 80 kilograms (180 lb.) A bone possibly belonging to Mullerornis has been radiocarbon dated to about 1260 BP, suggesting that the animal was still extant at the end of the first millennium.

Common name	Scientific name	Status	IUCN code
Lesser elephant bird	Mullerornis modestus	Extinct	EX

== Ducks, geese, and waterfowl ==
Order: Anseriformes Family: Anatidae

Anatidae includes the ducks and most duck-like waterfowl, such as geese and swans. These birds are adapted to an aquatic existence with webbed feet, flattened bills, and feathers that are excellent at shedding water due to an oily coating.

Common name	Scientific name	Status	IUCN code
White-faced whistling-duck	Dendrocygna viduata	Common resident	LC
Fulvous whistling-duck	Dendrocygna bicolor	Uncommon resident	LC
White-backed duck	Thalassornis leuconotus	Rare resident	LC
Knob-billed duck	Sarkidiornis melanotos	Locally common resident	LC
African pygmy-goose	Nettapus auritus	Common resident	LC
Blue-billed teal	Spatula hottentota	Locally common resident	LC
Meller's duck*	Anas melleri	Uncommon resident	EN
Mallard%	Anas platyrhynchos	Introduced species	LC
Red-billed duck	Anas erythrorhyncha	Common resident	LC
Bernier's teal*	Anas bernieri	Rare resident	EN
Madagascar pochard*	Aythya innotata	Recently rediscovered	CR

== Guineafowl ==
Order: Galliformes Family: Numididae

The guineafowl are a family of birds native to Africa. They typically eat insects and seeds, are ground-nesting, and resemble partridges, except with featherless heads.

Common name	Scientific name	Status	IUCN code
Helmeted guineafowl%	Numida meleagris	Common resident	LC

== Pheasants, grouse, and allies ==
Order: Galliformes Family: Phasianidae

Phasianidae consists of the pheasants and their allies. These are terrestrial species, variable in size but generally plump, with broad, relatively short wings. Many species are gamebirds or have been domesticated as a food source for humans.

Common name	Scientific name	Status	IUCN code
Madagascar partridge*	Margaroperdix madagarensis	Uncommon resident	LC
Common quail	Coturnix coturnix	Uncommon resident	LC
Harlequin quail	Coturnix delegorguei	Uncommon visitor	LC

== Flamingos ==
Order: Phoenicopteriformes Family: Phoenicopteridae

Flamingos are gregarious wading birds, usually 3 to 5 feet (0.9 to 1.5 m) tall, found in both the Western and Eastern Hemispheres. Flamingos filter-feed on shellfish and algae. Their oddly shaped beaks are specially adapted to separate mud and silt from the food they consume and, uniquely, are used upside-down.

Common name	Scientific name	Status	IUCN code
Greater flamingo	Phoenicopterus roseus	Regular, rare breeder	LC
Lesser flamingo	Phoenicopterus minor	Erratic migrant	NT

== Grebes ==
Order: Podicipediformes Family: Podicipedidae

Grebes are small to medium-large freshwater diving birds. They have lobed toes and are excellent swimmers and divers. However, they have their feet placed far back on the body, making them quite ungainly on land.

Common name	Scientific name	Status	IUCN code
Alaotra grebe*	Tachybaptus rufolavatus	Extinct	EX
Little grebe	Tachybaptus ruficollis	Locally common resident	LC
Madagascar grebe*	Tachybaptus pelzelnii	Uncommon resident	EN

== Pigeons and doves ==
Order: Columbiformes Family: Columbidae

Pigeons and doves are stout-bodied birds with short necks and short slender bills with a fleshy cere.

Common name	Scientific name	Status	IUCN cod
Rock pigeon%	Columba livia		LC
Malagasy turtle-dove	Nesoenas picturatus		LC
Namaqua dove	Oena capensis		LC
Zebra dove%	Geopelia striata		LC
Madagascar green-pigeon	Treron australis		LC
Madagascar blue-pigeon*	Alectroenas madagascariensis		LC

== Mesites ==
Order: Mesitornithiformes Family: Mesitornithidae

The mesites (Mesitornithidae) are a family of birds that are part of a clade (Columbimorphae) that include Columbiformes and Pterocliformes. They are smallish flightless or near flightless birds endemic to Madagascar. They are the only family with more than two species in which every species is threatened (all three are listed as vulnerable).

Common name	Scientific name	Status	IUCN code
White-breasted mesite*	Mesitornis variegata	Locally common resident	VU
Brown mesite*	Mesitornis unicolor	Uncommon resident	VU
Subdesert mesite*	Monias benschi	Uncommon resident	VU

== Sandgrouse ==
Order: Pterocliformes Family: Pteroclidae

Sandgrouse have small, pigeon like heads and necks, but sturdy compact bodies. They have long pointed wings and sometimes tails and a fast direct flight. Flocks fly to watering holes at dawn and dusk. Their legs are feathered down to the toes.

Common name	Scientific name	Status	IUCN code
Madagascar sandgrouse*	Pterocles personatus		LC

== Cuckoos ==
Order: Cuculiformes Family: Cuculidae

The family Cuculidae includes cuckoos, roadrunners and anis. These birds are of variable size with slender bodies, long tails and strong legs.

Common name	Scientific name	Status	IUCN cod
Crested coua*	Coua cristata		LC
Verreaux's coua*	Coua verreauxi		LC
Blue coua*	Coua caerulea		LC
Red-capped coua*	Coua ruficeps		LC
Red-fronted coua*	Coua reynaudii		LC
Coquerel's coua*	Coua coquereli		LC
Running coua*	Coua cursor		LC
Giant coua*	Coua gigas		LC
Snail-eating coua*	Coua delalandei	Extinct	EX
Red-breasted coua*	Coua serriana		LC
Malagasy coucal	Centropus toulou		LC
Thick-billed cuckoo	Pachycoccyx audeberti		LC
Madagascar cuckoo	Cuculus rochii		LC

== Nightjars and allies ==
Order: Caprimulgiformes Family: Caprimulgidae

Nightjars are medium-sized nocturnal birds that usually nest on the ground. They have long wings, short legs and very short bills. Most have small feet, of little use for walking, and long pointed wings. Their soft plumage is camouflaged to resemble bark or leaves.

Common name	Scientific name	Status	IUCN cod
Collared nightjar*	Gactornis enarratus		LC
Madagascar nightjar	Caprimulgus madagascariensis		LC

== Swifts ==
Order: Apodiformes Family: Apodidae

Swifts are small birds which spend the majority of their lives flying. These birds have very short legs and never settle voluntarily on the ground, perching instead only on vertical surfaces. Many swifts have long swept-back wings which resemble a crescent or boomerang.

Common name	Scientific name	Status	IUCN cod
Madagascar spinetail	Zoonavena grandidieri	Widespread resident	LC
Alpine swift	Apus melba	Widespread resident	LC
African swift	Apus barbatus		LC
Malagasy swift	Apus balstoni	Widespread resident	LC
Little swift	Apus affinis	Recent colonist	LC
Malagasy palm-swift	Cypsiurus gracilis	Widespread resident	LC

== Flufftails ==
Order: Gruiformes Family: Sarothruridae

The flufftails are a small family of ground-dwelling birds found only in Madagascar and sub-Saharan Africa.

Common name	Scientific name	Status	IUCN cod
Madagascar wood-rail*	Mentocrex kioloides		LC
Tsingy wood-rail*	Mentocrex beankaensis	Range-restricted resident	NT
Madagascar flufftail*	Sarothrura insularis		LC
Slender-billed flufftail*	Sarothrura watersi		EN

== Rails, gallinules, and coots ==
Order: Gruiformes Family: Rallidae

Rallidae is a large family of small to medium-sized birds which includes the rails, crakes, coots and gallinules. Typically they inhabit dense vegetation in damp environments near lakes, swamps or rivers. In general they are shy and secretive birds, making them difficult to observe. Most species have strong legs and long toes which are well adapted to soft uneven surfaces. They tend to have short, rounded wings and to be weak fliers.

Common name	Scientific name	Status	IUCN cod
Madagascar rail*	Rallus madagascariensis		VU
White-throated rail	Dryolimnas cuvieri		LC
Corn crake	Crex crex	Rare/accidental	LC
Spotted crake	Porzana porzana	Rare/accidental	LC
Eurasian moorhen	Gallinula chloropus		LC
Red-knobbed coot	Fulica cristata		LC
Allen's gallinule	Porphyrio alleni		LC
African swamphen	Porphyrio madagascariensis		NR
Little crake	Zapornia parva	Rare/accidental	LC
Baillon's crake	Zapornia pusilla		LC
Sakalava rail*	Zapornia olivieri		EN

== Stilts and avocets ==
Order: Charadriiformes Family: Recurvirostridae

Recurvirostridae is a family of large wading birds, which includes the avocets and stilts. The avocets have long legs and long up-curved bills. The stilts have extremely long legs and long, thin, straight bills.

Common name	Scientific name	Status	IUCN cod
Black-winged stilt	Himantopus himantopus	Fairly common resident	LC
Pied avocet	Recurvirostra avosetta	Very rare vagrant	LC

== Plovers and lapwings ==
Order: Charadriiformes Family: Charadriidae

The family Charadriidae includes the plovers, dotterels and lapwings. They are small to medium-sized birds with compact bodies, short, thick necks and long, usually pointed, wings. They are found in open country worldwide, mostly in habitats near water.

Common name	Scientific name	Status	IUCN cod
Black-bellied plover	Pluvialis squatarola		LC
Pacific golden-plover	Pluvialis fulva	Rare/accidental	LC
Lesser sand-plover	Charadrius mongolus	Rare/accidental	LC
Greater sand-plover	Charadrius leschenaultii		LC
Kittlitz's plover	Charadrius pecuarius		LC
Common ringed plover	Charadrius hiaticula		LC
Madagascar plover*	Charadrius thoracicus		VU
Little ringed plover	Charadrius dubius	Rare/accidental	LC
Three-banded plover	Charadrius tricollaris		LC
White-fronted plover	Charadrius marginatus		LC
Oriental plover	Charadrius veredus		LC

== Painted-snipes ==
Order: Charadriiformes Family: Rostratulidae

Painted-snipes are short-legged, long-billed birds similar in shape to the true snipes, but more brightly coloured.

Common name	Scientific name	Status	IUCN cod
Greater painted-snipe	Rostratula benghalensis		LC

== Jacanas ==
Order: Charadriiformes Family: Jacanidae

The jacanas are a family of waders found worldwide within the tropical zone. They are identifiable by their huge feet and claws which enable them to walk on floating vegetation in the shallow lakes that are their preferred habitat.

Common name	Scientific name	Status	IUCN cod
Madagascar jacana*	Actophilornis albinucha		NT

== Sandpipers and allies ==
Order: Charadriiformes Family: Scolopacidae

Scolopacidae is a large diverse family of small to medium-sized shorebirds including the sandpipers, curlews, godwits, shanks, tattlers, woodcocks, snipes, dowitchers, and phalaropes. The majority of these species eat small invertebrates picked out of the mud or soil. Different lengths of legs and bills enable multiple species to feed in the same habitat, particularly on the coast, without direct competition for food.

Common name	Scientific name	Status	IUCN code
Whimbrel	Numenius phaeopus		LC
Eurasian curlew	Numenius arquata		NT
Bar-tailed godwit	Limosa lapponica		NT
Black-tailed godwit	Limosa limosa	Very rare vagrant	NT
Ruddy turnstone	Arenaria interpres		LC
Ruff	Calidris pugnax		LC
Sharp-tailed sandpiper	Calidris acuminata	Very rare vagrant	LC
Curlew sandpiper	Calidris ferruginea		NT
Sanderling	Calidris alba		LC
Little stint	Calidris minuta		LC
Buff-breasted sandpiper	Calidris subruficollis	Very rare vagrant	NT
Pectoral sandpiper	Calidris melanotos	Very rare vagrant	LC
Madagascar snipe*	Gallinago macrodactyla		VU
Terek sandpiper	Xenus cinereus		LC
Red-necked phalarope	Phalaropus lobatus	Very rare vagrant	LC
Common sandpiper	Actitis hypoleucos		LC
Green sandpiper	Tringa ochropus		LC
Common greenshank	Tringa nebularia		LC
Marsh sandpiper	Tringa stagnatilis		LC
Wood sandpiper	Tringa glareola		LC

== Buttonquails ==
Order: Charadriiformes Family: Turnicidae

The buttonquails are small, drab, running birds which resemble the true quails. The female is the brighter of the sexes and initiates courtship. The male incubates the eggs and tends the young.

Common name	Scientific name	Status	IUCN cod
Madagascar buttonquail*	Turnix nigricollis	Common resident	LC

== Crab-plover ==
Order: Charadriiformes Family: Dromadidae

The crab-plover is related to the waders. It resembles a plover but with very long grey legs and a strong heavy black bill similar to a tern. It has black-and-white plumage, a long neck, partially webbed feet and a bill designed for eating crabs.

Common name	Scientific name	Status	IUCN cod
Crab-plover	Dromas ardeola	Common visitor	LC

== Pratincoles and coursers ==
Order: Charadriiformes Family: Glareolidae

Glareolidae is a family of wading birds comprising the pratincoles, which have short legs, long pointed wings and long forked tails, and the coursers, which have long legs, short wings and long, pointed bills which curve downwards.

Common name	Scientific name	Status	IUCN cod
Oriental pratincole	Glareola maldivarum	Rare/accidental	LC
Madagascar pratincole	Glareola ocularis		NT

== Skuas and jaegers ==
Order: Charadriiformes Family: Stercorariidae

The family Stercorariidae are, in general, medium to large birds, typically with grey or brown plumage, often with white markings on the wings. They nest on the ground in temperate and arctic regions and are long-distance migrants.

Common name	Scientific name	Status	IUCN cod
South polar skua	Stercorarius maccormicki	Rare/accidental	LC
Brown skua	Stercorarius antarcticus	Rare/accidental	LC
Pomarine jaeger	Sterocorarius pomarinus	Rare/accidental	LC
Long-tailed jaeger	Stercorarius longicaudus	Rare/accidental	LC

== Gulls, terns, and skimmers ==
Order: Charadriiformes Family: Laridae

Laridae is a family of medium to large seabirds, the gulls and terns. Gulls are typically grey or white, often with black markings on the head or wings. They have stout, longish bills and webbed feet. Terns are a group of generally medium to large seabirds typically with grey or white plumage, often with black markings on the head. Most terns hunt fish by diving but some pick insects off the surface of fresh water. Terns are generally long-lived birds, with several species known to live in excess of 30 years.

Common name	Scientific name	Status	IUCN cod
Gray-hooded gull	Chroicocephalus cirrocephalus		LC
Sooty gull	Ichthyaetus hemprichii	Rare/accidental	LC
Kelp gull	Larus dominicanus		LC
Brown noddy	Anous stolidus		LC
Lesser noddy	Anous tenuirostris		LC
Sooty tern	Onychoprion fuscatus		LC
Bridled tern	Onychoprion anaethetus		LC
Little tern	Sternula albifrons	Rare/accidental	LC
Saunders's tern	Sternula saundersi		LC
Gull-billed tern	Gelochelidon nilotica	Rare/accidental	LC
Caspian tern	Hydroprogne caspia		LC
Black tern	Chlidonias niger	Rare/accidental	LC
White-winged tern	Chlidonias leucopterus		LC
Whiskered tern	Chlidonias hybrida		LC
Roseate tern	Sterna dougallii		LC
Black-naped tern	Sterna sumatrana		LC
Common tern	Sterna hirundo		LC
Great crested tern	Thalasseus bergii		LC
Sandwich tern	Thalasseus sandvicensis		LC
Lesser crested tern	Thalasseus bengalensis		LC

== Tropicbirds ==
Order: Phaethontiformes Family: Phaethontidae

Tropicbirds are slender white birds of tropical oceans, with exceptionally long central tail feathers. Their heads and long wings have black markings.

Common name	Scientific name	Status	IUCN cod
White-tailed tropicbird	Phaethon lepturus	Visiting breeder	LC
Red-billed tropicbird	Phaethon aethereus	Very rare vagrant	LC
Red-tailed tropicbird	Phaethon rubricauda	Visiting breeder	LC

== Penguins ==
Order: Sphenisciformes Family: Spheniscidae

The penguins are a group of aquatic, flightless birds living almost exclusively in the Southern Hemisphere. Most penguins feed on krill, fish, squid and other forms of sea life caught while swimming underwater. There is only one reported case of a penguin in Madagascar; a male rockhopper penguin of an unknown species appeared on the country's southern coast in 1956, most likely having swum from South Africa.

== Albatrosses ==
Order: Procellariiformes Family: Diomedeidae

The albatrosses are among the largest of flying birds, and the great albatrosses from the genus Diomedea have the largest wingspans of any extant birds.

Common name	Scientific name	Status	IUCN cod
Yellow-nosed albatross	Thalassarche chlororhynchos		EN
Salvin's albatross	Thalassarche salvini		VU
Black-browed albatross	Thalassarche melanophrys	Rare vagrant	EN
Wandering albatross	Diomedea exulans		VU

== Southern storm-petrels ==
Order: Procellariiformes Family: Oceanitidae

The southern storm-petrels are relatives of the petrels and are the smallest seabirds. They feed on planktonic crustaceans and small fish picked from the surface, typically while hovering. The flight is fluttering and sometimes bat-like.

Common name	Scientific name	Status	IUCN cod
Wilson's storm-petrel	Oceanites oceanicus	Regular migrant	LC
White-faced storm-petrel	Pelagodroma marina	Very rare vagrant	LC
White-bellied storm-petrel	Fregetta grallaria		LC
Black-bellied storm-petrel	Fregetta tropica	Regular	LC

== Shearwaters and petrels ==
Order: Procellariiformes Family: Procellariidae

The procellariids are the main group of medium-sized "true petrels", characterised by united nostrils with medium septum and a long outer functional primary.

Common name	Scientific name	Status	IUCN cod
Southern giant-petrel	Macronectes giganteus	Regular offshore	LC
Cape petrel	Daption capense	Offshore migrant, Rare/accidental	LC
Great-winged petrel	Pterodroma macroptera	Uncommon	LC
Soft-plumaged petrel	Pterodroma mollis		LC
Barau's petrel	Pterodroma baraui		EN
Broad-billed prion	Pachyptila vittata	Rare vagrant	LC
Salvin's prion	Pachyptila salvini	Rare vagrant	LC
Bulwer's petrel	Bulweria bulwerii	Very rare vagrant	LC
Jouanin's petrel	Bulweria fallax	Very rare vagrant	NT
Cory's shearwater	Calonectris diomedea		LC
Flesh-footed shearwater	Ardenna carneipes		NT
Wedge-tailed shearwater	Ardenna pacifica	Uncommon offshore	LC
Tropical shearwater	Puffinus bailloni	Uncommon offshore	LC

== Storks ==
Order: Ciconiiformes Family: Ciconiidae

Storks are large, long-legged, long-necked, wading birds with long, stout bills. Storks are virtually mute, but bill-clattering is an important mode of communication at the nest. Their nests can be large and may be reused for many years. Many species are migratory.

Common name	Scientific name	Status	IUCN cod
African openbill	Anastomus lamelligerus	Resident	LC
Yellow-billed stork	Mycteria ibis	Locally common	LC

== Frigatebirds ==
Order: Suliformes Family: Fregatidae

Frigatebirds are large seabirds usually found over tropical oceans. They are large, black and white or completely black, with long wings and deeply forked tails. The males have coloured inflatable throat pouches. They do not swim or walk and cannot take off from a flat surface. Having the largest wingspan-to-body-weight ratio of any bird, they are essentially aerial, able to stay aloft for more than a week.

Common name	Scientific name	Status	IUCN cod
Lesser frigatebird	Fregata ariel	Casual visitor	LC
Great frigatebird	Fregata minor	Casual visitor	LC

== Boobies and gannets ==
Order: Suliformes Family: Sulidae

The gannets and boobies in the family Sulidae are medium to large coastal seabirds that plunge-dive for fish.

Common name	Scientific name	Status	IUCN cod
Masked booby	Sula dactylatra	Very rare vagrant	LC
Brown booby	Sula leucogaster	Visiting breeder	LC
Red-footed booby	Sula sula	Uncommon visitor	LC

== Anhingas ==
Order: Suliformes Family: Anhingidae

Anhingas or darters are often called "snake-birds" because they have long thin necks, which gives a snake-like appearance when they swim with their bodies submerged. The males have black and dark-brown plumage, an erectile crest on the nape, and a larger bill than the female. The females have much paler plumage, especially on the neck and underparts. The darters have completely webbed feet and their legs are short and set far back on the body. Their plumage is somewhat permeable, like that of cormorants, and they spread their wings to dry after diving.

Common name	Scientific name	Status	IUCN cod
African darter	Anhinga rufa	Resident	LC

== Cormorants and shags ==
Order: Suliformes Family: Phalacrocoracidae

Phalacrocoracidae is a family of medium to large coastal, fish-eating seabirds that includes cormorants and shags. Plumage colouration varies; the majority of species have mainly dark plumage, but some are pied black and white, and a few are more colourful.

Common name	Scientific name	Status	IUCN code
Long-tailed cormorant	Microcarbo africanus	Resident	LC

== Pelicans ==
Order: Pelecaniformes Family: Pelecanidae

Pelicans are large water birds with a distinctive pouch under their beak. As with other members of the order Pelecaniformes, they have webbed feet with four toes.

Common name	Scientific name	Status	IUCN code
Pink-backed pelican	Pelecanus rufescens	Rare vagrant	LC

== Hamerkop ==
Order: Pelecaniformes Family: Scopidae

The hamerkop is a medium-sized bird with a long shaggy crest. The shape of its head with a curved bill and crest at the back is reminiscent of a hammer, hence its name. Its plumage is drab-brown all over.

Common name	Scientific name	Status	IUCN code
Hamerkop	Scopus umbretta	Resident	LC

== Herons, egrets, and bitterns ==
Order: Pelecaniformes Family: Ardeidae

The family Ardeidae contains the bitterns, herons, and egrets. Herons and egrets are medium to large wading birds with long necks and legs. Bitterns tend to be shorter necked and more wary. Members of Ardeidae fly with their necks retracted, unlike other long-necked birds such as storks, ibises, and spoonbills.

Common name	Scientific name	Status	IUCN code
Little bittern	Ixobrychus minutus	Scarce breeder	LC
Gray heron	Ardea cinerea	Fairly common resident	LC
Black-headed heron	Ardea melanocephala	Very rare vagrant	LC
Humblot's heron	Ardea humbloti	Uncommon resident	EN
Purple heron	Ardea purpurea	Fairly common resident	LC
Great egret	Ardea alba	Common resident	LC
Little egret	Egretta garzetta		LC
Western reef-heron	Egretta gularis	Rare/accidental	LC
Black heron	Egretta ardesiaca	Fairly common resident	LC
Cattle egret	Bubulcus ibis	Common resident	LC
Squacco heron	Ardeola ralloides	Common resident	LC
Malagasy pond-heron	Ardeola idae	Visiting breeder	EN
Striated heron	Butorides striata	Fairly common resident	LC
Black-crowned night-heron	Nycticorax nycticorax	Uncommon resident	LC

== Ibises and spoonbills ==
Order: Pelecaniformes Family: Threskiornithidae

Threskiornithidae is a family of large terrestrial and wading birds which includes the ibises and spoonbills. They have long, broad wings with 11 primary and about 20 secondary feathers. They are strong fliers and despite their size and weight, very capable soarers.

Common name	Scientific name	Status	IUCN code
Glossy ibis	Plegadis falcinellus	Common resident	LC
Madagascar ibis*	Lophotibis cristata	Rare resident	NT
African sacred ibis	Threskiornis aethiopicus	Rare/accidental	LC
Malagasy sacred ibis	Threskiornis bernieri	Rare resident	EN
African spoonbill	Platalea alba	Uncommon resident	LC

== Osprey ==
Order: Accipitriformes Family: Pandionidae

The family Pandionidae contains only one species, the osprey. The osprey is a medium-large raptor which is a specialist fish-eater with a worldwide distribution.

Common name	Scientific name	Status	IUCN code
Osprey	Pandion haliaetus	Rare vagrant	LC

== Hawks, eagles, and kites ==
Order: Accipitriformes Family: Accipitridae

Accipitridae is a family of birds of prey, which includes hawks, eagles, kites, harriers and Old World vultures. These birds have powerful hooked beaks for tearing flesh from their prey, strong legs, powerful talons and keen eyesight.

Common name	Scientific name	Status	IUCN code
Black-winged kite	Elanus caeruleus	Rare/accidental	LC
African harrier-hawk	Polyboroides typus		LC
Madagascar harrier-hawk*	Polyboroides radiatus		LC
Madagascar serpent-eagle*	Eutriorchis astur		EN
Madagascar cuckoo-hawk*	Aviceda madagascariensis		LC
Bat hawk	Macheiramphus alcinus		LC
Long-crested eagle	Lophaetus occipitalis	Rare/accidental	LC
Eurasian marsh-harrier	Circus aeruginosus	Rare/accidental	LC
Malagasy harrier	Circus macrosceles		EN
Pallid harrier	Circus macrourus	Rare/accidental	NT
Frances's sparrowhawk*	Accipiter francesii		LC
Madagascar sparrowhawk*	Accipiter madagascariensis		NT
Henst's goshawk*	Accipiter henstii		NT
Black kite	Milvus migrans		LC
Madagascar fish-eagle*	Haliaeetus vociferoides		CR
Madagascar buzzard*	Buteo brachypterus		LC

== Barn owls ==
Order: Strigiformes Family: Tytonidae

Barn owls are medium to large owls with large heads and characteristic heart-shaped faces. They have long strong legs with powerful talons.

Common name	Scientific name	Status	IUCN code
Western barn owl	Tyto alba		LC
Red owl*	Tyto soumagnei		VU

== Owls ==
Order: Strigiformes Family: Strigidae

The typical owls are small to large solitary nocturnal birds of prey. They have large forward-facing eyes and ears, a hawk-like beak and a conspicuous circle of feathers around each eye called a facial disk.

Common name	Scientific name	Status	IUCN code
African scops-owl*	Otus senegalensis	Rare/accidental	LC
Madagascar scops-owl*	Otus rutilus		LC
White-browed owl	Athene superciliaris		LC
Madagascar owl*	Asio madagascariensis		LC
Marsh owl	Asio capensis		LC

== Cuckoo-roller ==
Order: Leptosomiformes Family: Leptosomidae

The cuckoo roller or courol (Leptosomus discolor) is the only bird in the family Leptosomidae, which was previously often placed in the order Coraciiformes but is now placed in its own order Leptosomiformes. Its nearest relative is not clear.

Common name	Scientific name	Status	IUCN code
Cuckoo-roller	Leptosomus discolor		LC

== Hoopoes ==
Order: Bucerotiformes Family: Upupidae

Hoopoes have black, white and orangey-pink colouring with a large erectile crest on their head.

Common name	Scientific name	Status	IUCN code
Eurasian hoopoe	Upupa epops		LC
Madagascar hoopoe*	Upupa marginata		LC

== Kingfishers ==
Order: Coraciiformes Family: Alcedinidae

Kingfishers are medium-sized birds with large heads, long, pointed bills, short legs and stubby tails.

Common name	Scientific name	Status	IUCN code
Malagasy kingfisher	Corythornis vintsioides	Common resident	LC
Madagascar pygmy kingfisher*	Corythornis madagascariensis	Common resident	LC

== Bee-eaters ==
Order: Coraciiformes Family: Meropidae

The bee-eaters are a group of birds in the family Meropidae. Most species are found in Africa but others occur in southern Europe, Madagascar, Australia and New Guinea. They are characterised by richly coloured plumage, slender bodies and usually elongated central tail feathers. All are colourful and have long downturned bills and pointed wings, which give them a swallow-like appearance when seen from afar.

Common name	Scientific name	Status	IUCN code
Madagascar bee-eater	Merops superciliosus		LC
European bee-eater	Merops apiaster	Very rare vagrant	LC

== Rollers ==
Order: Coraciiformes Family: Coraciidae

Rollers resemble crows in size and build, but are more closely related to the kingfishers and bee-eaters. They share the colourful appearance of those groups with blues and browns predominating. The two inner front toes are connected, but the outer toe is not.

Common name	Scientific name	Status	IUCN code
Broad-billed roller	Eurystomus glaucurus		LC

== Ground-rollers ==
Order: Coraciiformes Family: Brachypteraciidae

The ground-rollers are a small family of non-migratory near-passerine birds restricted to Madagascar. They are related to the kingfishers, bee-eaters and rollers. They most resemble the latter group, and are sometimes considered a sub-family of the true rollers.

Common name	Scientific name	Status	IUCN code
Short-legged ground-roller*	Brachypteracias leptosomus	Resident	VU
Scaly ground-roller*	Brachypteracias squamigera	Resident	VU
Pitta-like ground-roller*	Atelornis pittoides	Resident	LC
Rufous-headed ground-roller*	Atelornis crossleyi	Resident	NT
Long-tailed ground-roller*	Uratelornis chimaera	Resident	VU

== Falcons and caracaras ==
Order: Falconiformes Family: Falconidae

Falconidae is a family of diurnal birds of prey. They differ from hawks, eagles and kites in that they kill with their beaks instead of their talons.

Common name	Scientific name	Status	IUCN code
Malagasy kestrel	Falco newtoni	Resident	LC
Banded kestrel*	Falco zoniventris	Uncommon resident	LC
Eleonora's falcon	Falco eleonorae	Winter visitor	LC
Sooty falcon	Falco concolor	Winter visitor	VU
Peregrine falcon	Falco peregrinus	Scarce resident	LC

== Old World parrots ==
Order: Psittaciformes Family: Psittaculidae

Characteristic features of parrots include a strong curved bill, an upright stance, strong legs, and clawed zygodactyl feet. Many parrots are vividly colored, and some are multi-colored. In size they range from 8 cm (3.1 in) to 1 m (3.3 ft) in length. Old World parrots are found from Africa east across south and southeast Asia and Oceania to Australia and New Zealand.

Common name	Scientific name	Status	IUCN code
Greater vasa parrot	Coracopsis vasa		LC
Lesser vasa parrot	Coracopsis nigra		LC
Gray-headed lovebird*	Agapornis canus		LC

== Asities ==
Order: Passeriformes Family: Philepittidae

The asities are a family of birds, Philepittidae, that are endemic to Madagascar. The asities consist of four species in two genera. The Neodrepanis species are known as sunbird-asities and were formerly known as false sunbirds.

Common name	Scientific name	Status	IUCN code
Velvet asity*	Philepitta castanea		LC
Schlegel's asity*	Philepitta schlegeli		NT
Common sunbird-asity*	Neodrepanis coruscans		LC
Yellow-bellied sunbird-asity*	Neodrepanis hypoxanthus		VU

== Cuckooshrikes ==
Order: Passeriformes Family: Campephagidae

The cuckooshrikes are small to medium-sized passerine birds. They are predominantly greyish with white and black, although some minivet species are brightly coloured.

Common name	Scientific name	Status	IUCN code
Madagascar cuckooshrike	Ceblepyris cinereus		LC

== Old World orioles ==
Order: Passeriformes Family: Oriolidae

The Old World orioles are colourful passerine birds which are not closely related to the New World orioles.

Common name	Scientific name	Status	IUCN code
Eurasian golden oriole	Oriolus oriolus	Rare/accidental	LC

== Vangas, helmetshrikes, and allies ==
Order: Passeriformes Family: Vangidae

The family Vangidae is highly variable, though most of its members resemble true shrikes to some degree.

Common name	Scientific name	Status	IUCN code
Archbold's newtonia*	Newtonia archboldi		LC
Common newtonia*	Newtonia brunneicauda		LC
Dark newtonia*	Newtonia amphichroa		LC
Red-tailed newtonia*	Newtonia fanovanae		VU
Tylas vanga*	Tylas eduardi		LC
Red-tailed vanga*	Calicalicus madagascariensis	Fairly common resident	LC
Red-shouldered vanga*	Calicalicus rufocarpalis	Uncommon resident	VU
Nuthatch-vanga*	Hypositta corallirostris		LC
Chabert vanga*	Leptopterus chabert		LC
Crossley's vanga*	Mystacornis crossleyi		LC
Madagascar blue vanga*	Cyanolanius madagascarinus		LC
Hook-billed vanga*	Vanga curvirostris		LC
Ward's flycatcher*	Pseudobias wardi	Range-restricted resident	LC
Rufous vanga*	Schetba rufa		LC
Helmet vanga*	Euryceros prevostii		VU
Bernier's vanga*	Oriolia bernieri		EN
Sickle-billed vanga*	Falculea palliata		LC
White-headed vanga*	Artamella viridis		LC
Pollen's vanga*	Xenopirostris polleni		NT
Lafresnaye's vanga*	Xenopirostris xenopirostris		LC
Van Dam's vanga*	Xenopirostris damii		EN

== Drongos ==
Order: Passeriformes Family: Dicruridae

The drongos are mostly black or dark grey in colour, sometimes with metallic tints. They have long forked tails, and some Asian species have elaborate tail decorations. They have short legs and sit very upright when perched, like a shrike. They flycatch or take prey from the ground. All are notorious for mobbing predators.

Common name	Scientific name	Status	IUCN code
Crested drongo	Dicrurus forficatus	Common resident	LC

== Monarch flycatchers ==
Order: Passeriformes Family: Monarchidae

The monarch flycatchers are small to medium-sized insectivorous passerines which hunt by gleaning, hovering or flycatching.

Common name	Scientific name	Status	IUCN code
Malagasy paradise-flycatcher	Terpsiphone mutata	Common resident	LC

== Crows, jays, and magpies ==
Order: Passeriformes Family: Corvidae

The family Corvidae includes crows, ravens, jays, choughs, magpies, treepies, nutcrackers, and ground jays. Corvids are above average in size among the Passeriformes, and some of the larger species show high levels of intelligence.

Common name	Scientific name	Status	IUCN code
House crow	Corvus splendens	Very rare vagrant	LC
Pied crow	Corvus albus	Common resident	LC

== Larks ==
Order: Passeriformes Family: Alaudidae

Larks are small terrestrial birds with often extravagant songs and display flights. Most larks are fairly dull in appearance. Their food is insects and seeds.

Common name	Scientific name	Status	IUCN code
Madagascar lark*	Eremopterix hova		LC

== Cisticolas and allies ==
Order: Passeriformes Family: Cisticolidae

The Cisticolidae are warblers found mainly in warmer southern regions of the Old World. They are generally very small birds of drab brown or grey appearance found in open country such as grassland or scrub.

Common name	Scientific name	Status	IUCN code
Common jery*	Neomixis tenella		LC
Green jery*	Neomixis viridis		LC
Stripe-throated jery*	Neomixis striatigula		LC
Madagascar cisticola	Cisticola cherinus		LC

== Reed warblers and allies ==
Order: Passeriformes Family: Acrocephalidae

The members of this family are usually rather large for "warblers". Most are rather plain olivaceous brown above with much yellow to beige below. They are usually found in open woodland, reedbeds, or tall grass. The family occurs mostly in southern to western Eurasia and surroundings, but it also ranges far into the Pacific, with some species in Africa.

Common name	Scientific name	Status	IUCN code
Malagasy brush-warbler*	Nesillas typica (E)		LC
Subdesert brush-warbler*	Nesillas lantzii (E)		LC
Madagascar swamp warbler*	Acrocephalus newtoni		LC

== Grassbirds and allies ==
Order: Passeriformes Family: Locustellidae

Locustellidae are a family of small insectivorous songbirds found mainly in Eurasia, Africa, and the Australian region. They are smallish birds with tails that are usually long and pointed, and tend to be drab brownish or buffy all over.

Common name	Scientific name	Status	IUCN code
Gray emutail*	Bradypterus seebohmi		LC
Brown emutail*	Bradypterus brunneus		LC

== Malagasy warblers ==
Order: Passeriformes Family: Bernieridae

The Malagasy warblers are a newly validated family of songbirds. They were formally named Bernieridae in 2010. The family currently consists of eleven species (in eight genera) of small forest birds. These birds are all endemic to Madagascar.

Common name	Scientific name	Status	IUCN code
White-throated oxylabes*	Oxylabes madagascariensis		LC
Long-billed bernieria*	Bernieria madagascariensis		LC
Cryptic warbler*	Cryptosylvicola randriansoloi		LC
Wedge-tailed jery*	Hartertula flavoviridis		NT
Thamnornis*	Thamnornis chloropetoides		LC
Yellow-browed oxylabes*	Crossleyia xanthophrys		NT
Spectacled tetraka*	Xanthomixis zosterops		LC
Appert's tetraka*	Xanthomixis apperti		VU
Dusky tetraka*	Xanthomixis tenebrosus		VU
Gray-crowned tetraka*	Xanthomixis cinereiceps		NT
Rand's warbler*	Randia pseudozosterops		LC

== Swallows ==
Order: Passeriformes Family: Hirundinidae

The family Hirundinidae is adapted to aerial feeding. They have a slender streamlined body, long pointed wings, and a short bill with a wide gape. The feet are adapted to perching rather than walking, and the front toes are partially joined at the base.

Common name	Scientific name	Status	IUCN code
Plain martin	Riparia paludicola		LC
Bank swallow	Riparia riparia	Rare/accidental	LC
Mascarene martin	Phedina borbonica		LC
Barn swallow	Hirundo rustica	Rare/accidental	LC
Common house-martin	Delichon urbicum	Rare/accidental	LC

== Bulbuls ==
Order: Passeriformes Family: Pycnonotidae

Bulbuls are medium-sized songbirds. Some are colourful with yellow, red, or orange vents, cheeks, throats, or supercilia, but most are drab, with uniform olive-brown to black plumage. Some species have distinct crests.

Common name	Scientific name	Status	IUCN code
Malagasy bulbul	Hypsipetes madagascariensis		LC

== White-eyes, yuhinas, and allies ==
Order: Passeriformes Family: Zosteropidae

The white-eyes are small birds of rather drab appearance, the plumage above being typically greenish-olive, but some species have a white or bright yellow throat, breast, or lower parts, and several have buff flanks. As the name suggests, many species have a white ring around each eye.

Common name	Scientific name	Status	IUCN code
Malagasy white-eye	Zosterops maderaspatanus		LC

== Starlings ==
Order: Passeriformes Family: Sturnidae

Starlings are small to medium-sized passerine birds. Their flight is strong and direct and they are very gregarious. Their preferred habitat is fairly open country. They eat insects and fruit. Plumage is typically dark with a metallic sheen.

Common name	Scientific name	Status	IUCN code
Wattled starling	Creatophora cinerea	Very rare vagrant	LC
Common myna%	Acridotheres tristis	Introduced and spreading	LC
Madagascar starling*	Hartlaubius auratus	Fairly common northwest, north and east	LC

== Old World flycatchers ==
Order: Passeriformes Family: Muscicapidae

Old World flycatchers are a large group of small arboreal insectivores. The appearance of these birds is highly varied, but they mostly have weak songs and harsh calls.

Common name	Scientific name	Status	IUCN code
Madagascar magpie-robin*	Copsychus albospecularis		LC
Forest rock-thrush*	Monticola sharpei		LC
Amber Mountain rock thrush*	Monticola erythronotus		EN
Littoral rock-thrush*	Monticola imerinus		LC
African stonechat*	Saxicola torquatus		LC
Northern wheatear	Oenanthe oenanthe	Very rare vagrant	LC

== Sunbirds and spiderhunters ==
Order: Passeriformes Family: Nectariniidae

The sunbirds and spiderhunters are very small passerine birds which feed largely on nectar, although they will also take insects, especially when feeding young. Their flight is fast and direct on short wings. Most species can take nectar by hovering like a hummingbird, but usually perch to feed.

Common name	Scientific name	Status	IUCN code
Souimanga sunbird	Cinnyris sovimanga		LC
Malagasy green sunbird	Cinnyris notatus		LC

== Weavers and allies ==
Order: Passeriformes Family: Ploceidae

The weavers are small passerine birds related to the finches. They are seed-eating birds with rounded conical bills. The males of many species are brightly coloured, usually in red or yellow and black, but some species show variation in colour only in the breeding season.

Common name	Scientific name	Status	IUCN code
Nelicourvi weaver*	Ploceus nelicourvi	Fairly common in suitable habitat	LC
Sakalava weaver*	Ploceus sakalava		LC
Red fody*	Foudia madagascariensis	Very common	LC
Forest fody*	Foudia omissa	Fairly common	LC

== Waxbills and allies ==
Order: Passeriformes Family: Estrildidae

The estrildid finches are small passerine birds of the Old World tropics and Australasia. They are gregarious and often colonial seed eaters with short thick but pointed bills. They are all similar in structure and habits, but have wide variation in plumage colours and patterns.

Common name	Scientific name	Status	IUCN code
Madagascar mannikin*	Lepidopygia nana	Common in suitable habitat	LC
Common waxbill%	Estrilda astrild	Introduced and local	LC

== Old World sparrows ==
Order: Passeriformes Family: Passeridae

Sparrows are small passerine birds, typically small, plump, brown or grey with short tails and short powerful beaks. They are seed-eaters, but also consume small insects.

Common name	Scientific name	Status	IUCN code
House sparrow%	Passer domesticus		LC

== Wagtails and pipits ==
Order: Passeriformes Family: Motacillidae

Motacillidae is a family of small passerine birds with medium to long tails and comprises the wagtails, longclaws, and pipits. These are slender ground-feeding insectivores of open country.

Common name	Scientific name	Status	IUCN code
Madagascar wagtail*	Motacilla flaviventris		LC
White wagtail	Motacilla alba	Accidental	LC

== See also ==
- Endemic birds of Madagascar and western Indian Ocean islands
- List of birds
- Lists of birds by region
