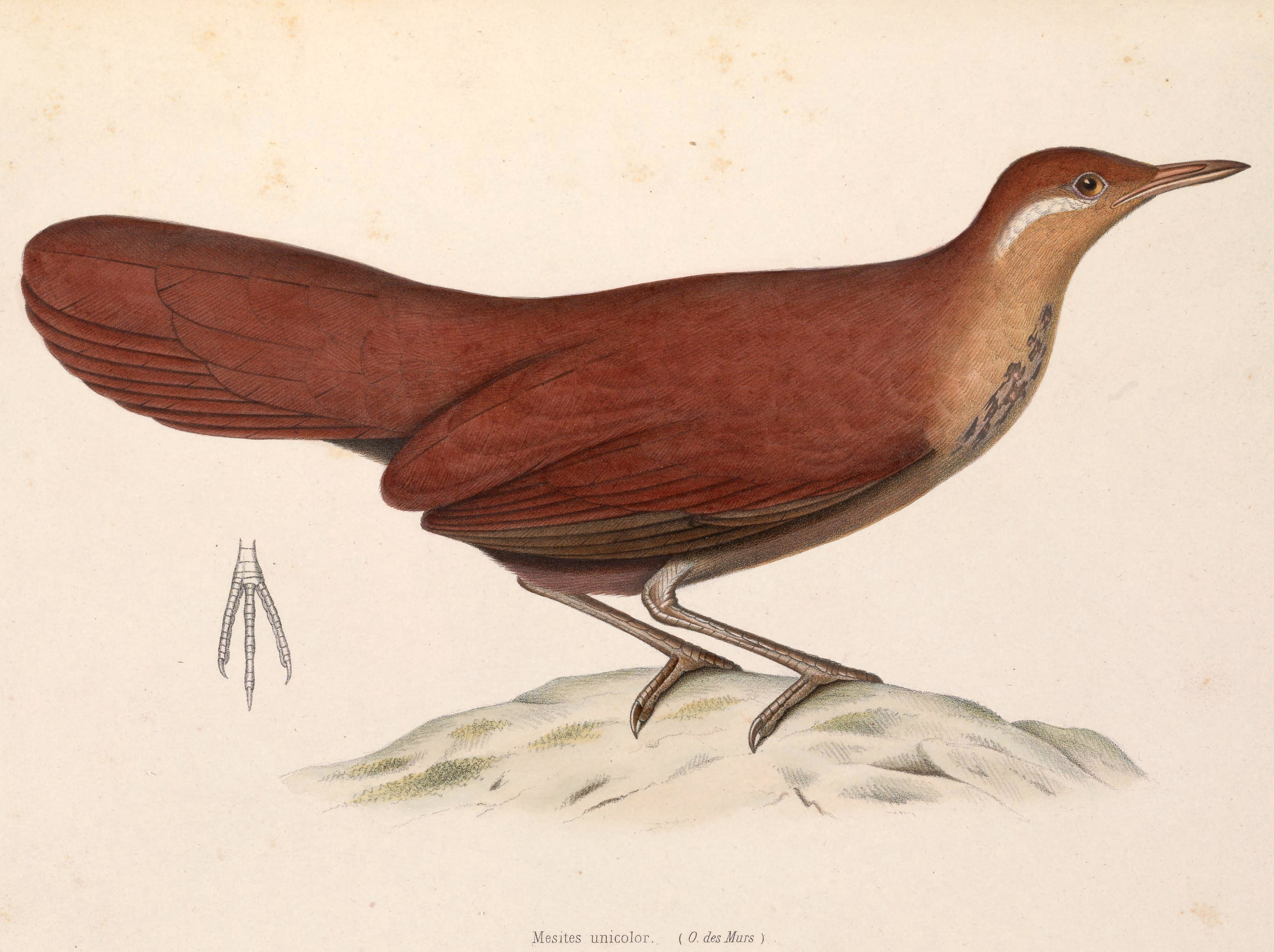
- Brown mesite (Mesitornis unicolor)

Scientific classification
- Kingdom: Animalia
- Phylum: Chordata
- Class: Aves
- Order: Mesitornithiformes
- Family: Mesitornithidae
- Genus: Mesitornis; Bonaparte, 1855

Type species
- Mesites variegata Geoffroy Saint-Hilaire, 1838

= Mesitornis =

Genus of birds

Mesitornis is a genus of birds in the family Mesitornithidae. Its two members, the white-breasted mesite and the brown mesite, are endemic to Madagascar, and both are classified as vulnerable on the International Union for Conservation of Nature (IUCN) Red list of Threatened species. The third mesite species, the subdesert mesite, is the sole member of the genus Monias.

== Species ==
=== Mesitornis ===
There are two species, the brown mesite (Mesitornis unicolor) and the white-breasted mesite (Mesitornis variegatus). They are medium-sized birds to 30 and 31 cm (11.8 and 12.2 in) respectively and are considered to look like the rails; a family (Rallidae) in which the mesites are sometimes placed. Both species are ground-nesting and move slowly amongst the undergrowth searching in the leaf litter for invertebrates.

The brown mesite is secretive and rarely seen. It lives in undisturbed primary, evergreen, humid forest along the eastern coast of Madagascar, from Marojejy National Park in the north to Tôlanaro to the south. The brown mesite's dark plumage provides camouflage amongst the leaf-litter.

The white-breasted mesite lives in small groups of two to four, usually an adult breeding pair and recent young. It is found in dry deciduous forest, within five sites in the north and west of Madagascar and one site in the east.

A third bird, also known as a mesite, is the subdesert mesite which grows to 32 cm (12.6 in) tall and is also ′rail-like′. The bird lives in small groups, and can be found in sub-desert spiny forests in a 200 km (120 mi) long and 30–60 km (19–37 mi) wide coastal strip, between the Fiherenana and Mangoky rivers.

Genus Mesitornis – Bonaparte, 1855 – two species
Common name	Scientific name and subspecies	Range	Size and ecology	IUCN status and estimated population
Brown mesite	Mesitornis unicolor (Des Murs, 1845)	Madagascar	Size: Habitat: Diet:	VU
White-breasted mesite	Mesitornis variegatus (Geoffroy Saint-Hilaire, I, 1838)	Madagascar.	Size: Habitat: Diet:	VU
