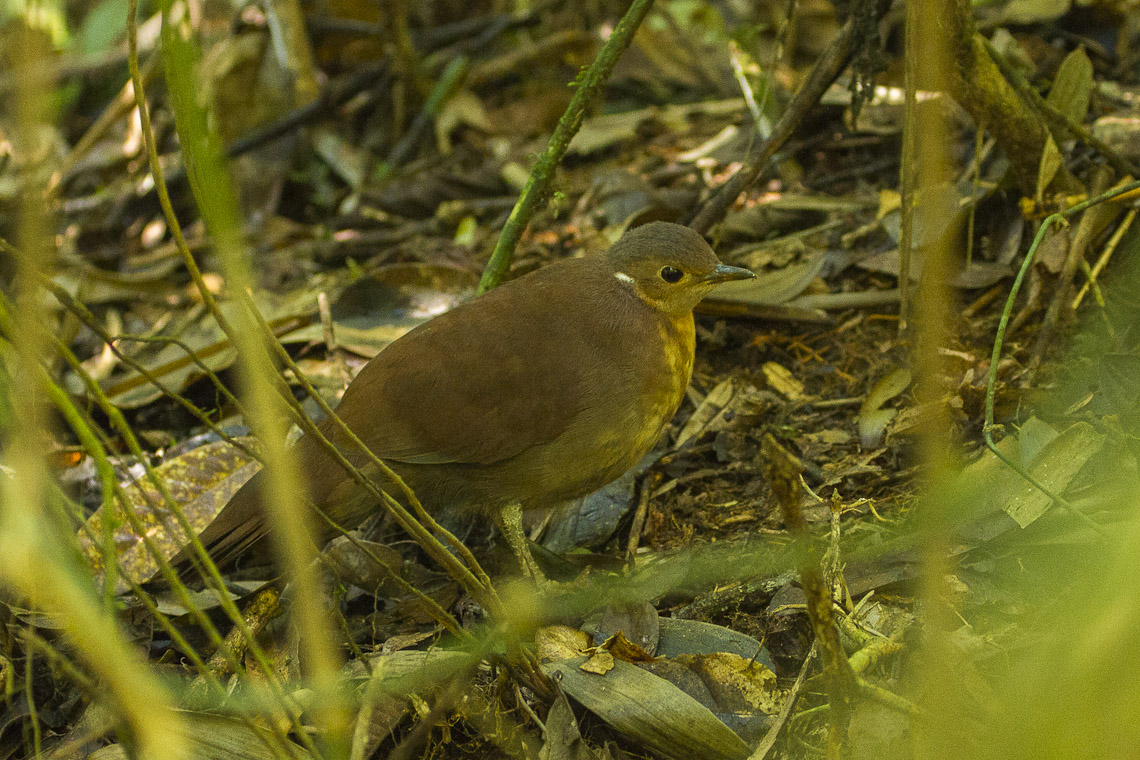

Conservation status
- Vulnerable (IUCN 3.1)

Scientific classification
- Kingdom: Animalia
- Phylum: Chordata
- Class: Aves
- Order: Mesitornithiformes
- Family: Mesitornithidae
- Genus: Mesitornis
- Species: M. unicolor

Binomial name
- Mesitornis unicolor (Des Murs, 1845)

= Brown mesite =

Species of bird

The brown mesite (Mesitornis unicolor) is a ground-dwelling bird endemic to Madagascar. It is one of three species in the mesite family or the Mesitornithidae, and though classified as vulnerable by the International Union for Conservation of Nature (IUCN), it is the most widespread of the three.

== Description ==
This species is a medium-sized terrestrial bird which is often described as rail-like. The species has a plain face, marked only by a slightly contrasting fleshy eye-ring around a rather large eye and a variable white streak behind the eye. It has a short straight bill. The upperparts of the bird are rufous brown, the underside tawny with no barring or spotting.

== Ecology ==
The brown mesite is a humid forest species, it forages by walking through the forest floor flicking over leaf-litter in order to find invertebrates. Its rufous brown plumage provides reasonable camouflage on the shady forest floor. The preferred habitat is undisturbed deciduous forest from sea-level up to 1,200 meters (3,900 ft). One to three eggs are laid in a nest which consists of a loose platform made from twigs and lined with plant fibre and leaves. The eggs are dull white with brown markings on one end. Soon after hatching the chicks leave the nest. It is secretive and rarely seen. The brown mesite has never been observed flying; this may be simply due to its secretive habits, or it may be because it is in fact flightless.

== Distribution ==
The brown mesite has a patchy distribution in humid evergreen forest along the eastern coast of Madagascar, from Marojejy National Park in the north to Tôlanaro to the south.

== Status ==
The population of this species is patchily distributed, and is vulnerable for preferring lower elevation forests which are under the greatest pressure from human disturbance. It is suspected that the population is rapidly declining because of predation by dogs, rats and by hunting. Its forests are also threatened by logging and subsistence agriculture. The International Union for Conservation of Nature has classified the conservation status of this bird as ″vulnerable″.
