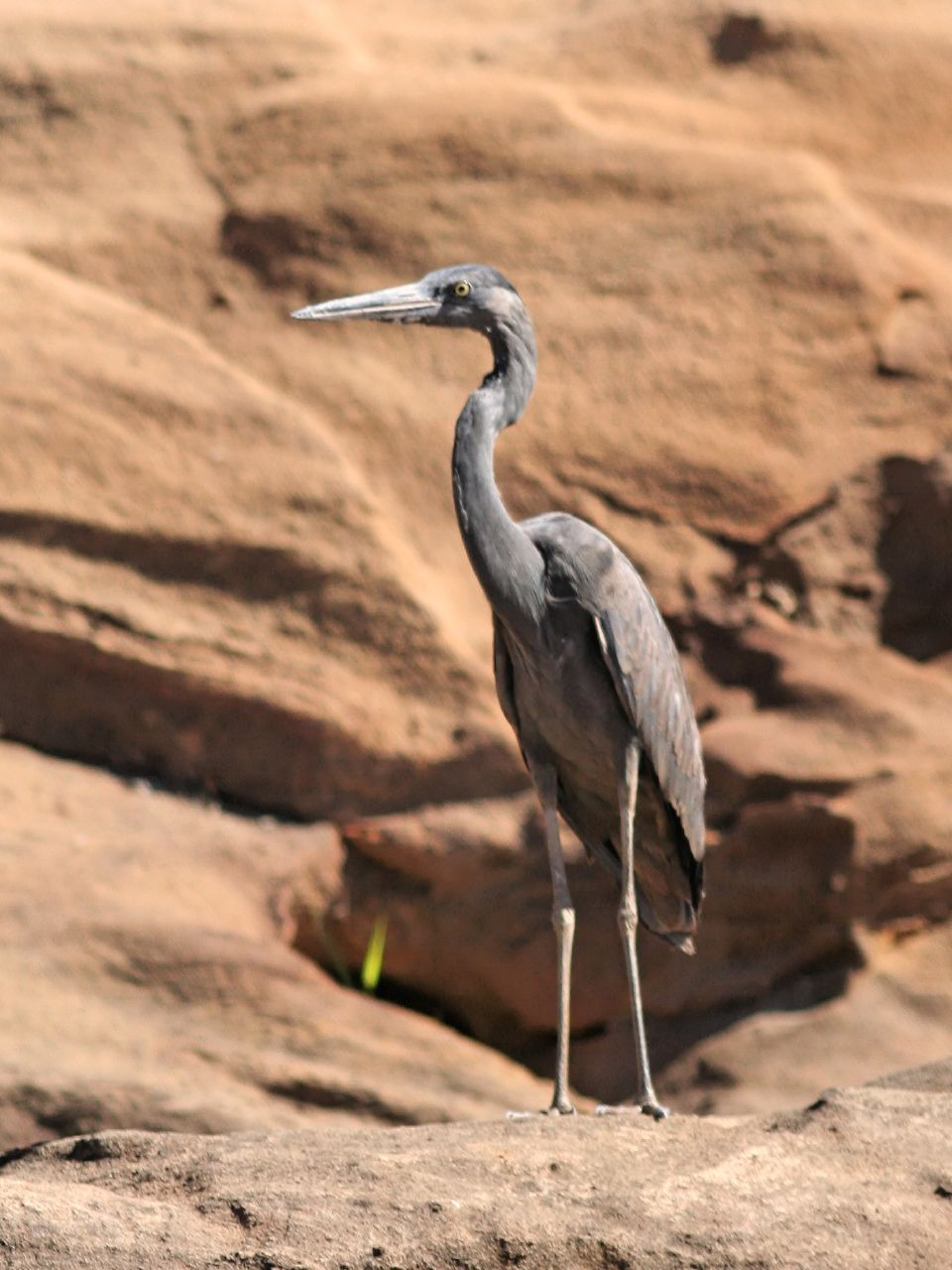

Conservation status
- Endangered (IUCN 3.1)

Scientific classification
- Kingdom: Animalia
- Phylum: Chordata
- Class: Aves
- Order: Pelecaniformes
- Family: Ardeidae
- Genus: Ardea
- Species: A. humbloti

Binomial name
- Ardea humbloti Milne-Edwards & Grandidier, 1885

= Humblot's heron =

Species of bird

Humblot's heron (Ardea humbloti), also known as the Madagascar heron, is a species of heron. It is commonly found on the north and west coasts of Madagascar but it is also present in the Comoro Islands and Mayotte. Humblot's heron is considered an endangered species due to its declining population. The major threats the heron faces are poaching, habitat destruction, and the invasion of alien species such as the water hyacinth.

== Taxonomy ==
Humblot's heron is part of the subfamily Ardeinae, which are known as "typical herons". It has been suggested that Humblot's heron may be a darker morph of the grey heron due to their many similar physical characteristics, but this claim has been successfully refuted. Humblot's heron was formally described by Henri Milne-Edwards and Alfred Grandidier in 1885.

Local Malagasy names for Humblot's heron include "Kisirano", "Langaro" and "Langaroko", however these names are also associated with different species of herons, such as the grey heron.

The scientific name commemorates the French naturalist Leon Humblot.

== Description ==
Humblot's heron has a uniform dark gray plumage on its body and darker feathers on its forehead and chin. Its nape feathers are elongated to form a crest. It has a large, pale bill as well as pale eyes and legs.

Humblot's heron is 92–100 cm (3.02–3.28 ft) tall. Its body weight can range between 1–1.6 kg (2.2–3.5 lb). The bill length ranges from 13–14.93 cm (5.12–5.88 in) while the bill depth ranges from 2.45–2.69 cm (0.96–1.06 in).

== Distribution and habitat ==
Humblot's heron is endemic to the island of Madagascar and is most commonly found in the coastal lowlands of southern, western and northern Madagascar. Small populations have also been found in the neighboring islands of Comoros and Mayotte. There has been one recorded and accepted observation of the heron in mainland Africa, in a game reserve in Tanzania. The total population of Humblot's heron in Madagascar was estimated in 2006 at 1,000 to 3,000 individuals.

Range of A. humbloti

Humblot's heron inhabits fresh, brackish or saltwater wetlands. It prefers tidal areas but also inhabits lakes, rivers, mangroves and estuaries. It is found most commonly at low elevations but has been recorded up to an altitude of 1,500 m (4,900 ft). It does not migrate, however it is able to disperse over long distances, as shown by its presence in mainland Africa.

== Behavior ==
=== Diet ===
Humblot's heron primarily eats medium and large-sized fish as well as crustaceans. They forage on floating vegetation in clear, shallow water or in the ingoing and outgoing tides. They are passive feeders, therefore they remain stationary for long periods of time, often hunched or with their neck extended over the water. After catching their prey, they will fly to solid ground to consume it.

=== Reproduction ===
Little information is known about its breeding cycle. Nesting has been observed year-round. Nests are typically on the ground and surrounded by dense aquatic vegetation. They can also be found in trees between 5–12 m (16–39 ft) tall. In Mayotte, the heron was observed nesting in mangroves.

The Humblot's heron's nest is mostly made of sticks and reeds and is approximately 50–70 cm (20–28 in) in diameter. Their eggs are blue and the typical clutch size is 3 eggs. Both parents take turns incubating the eggs.

=== Vocalizations ===
Its vocalizations are similar to the vocalizations of the grey heron. It is an irregular barking sound that lasts 0.5-1.0 s. Humblot's heron is also known to rattle its bill quietly while in its nest.

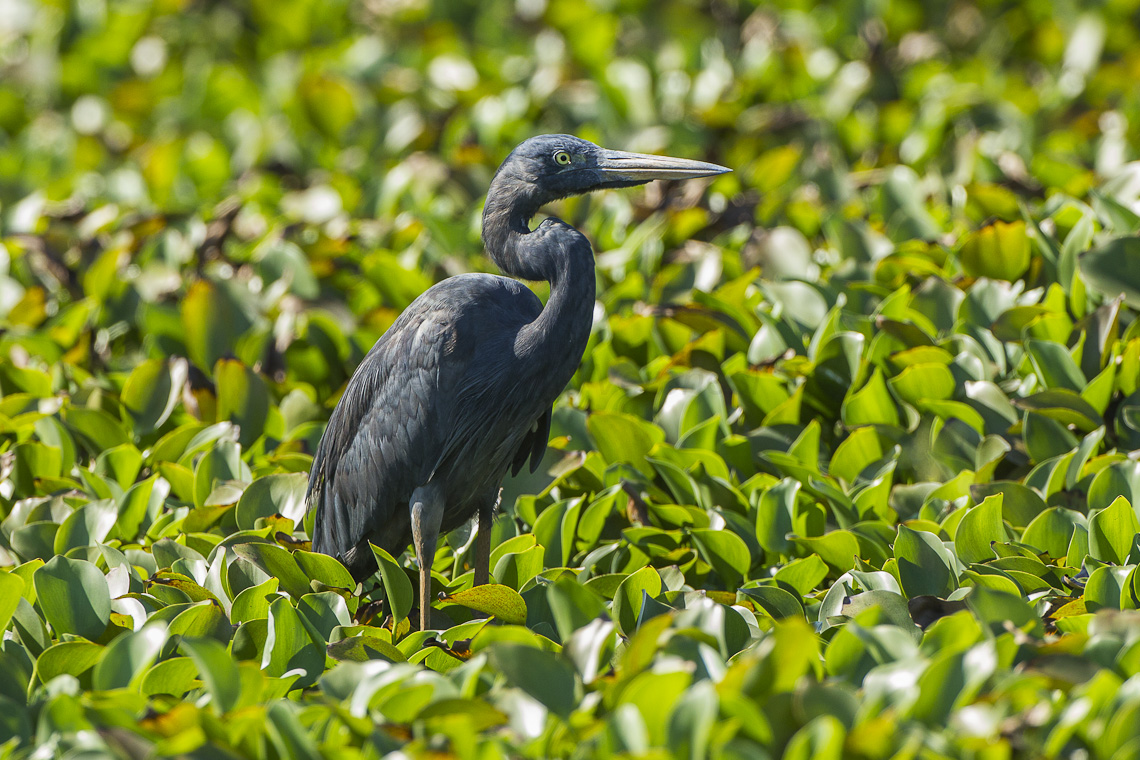
Humblot's heron in Ankarafantsika National Park, Madagascar

== Conservation status ==
Humblot's heron is considered endangered, per the IUCN Red List. Its population is declining most likely due to poaching, both of the eggs and of the bird. Additionally, due to the increasing human population in Western Madagascar, the wetlands where the heron nests are being transformed more and more into rice paddies. The increasingly drier climate is also contributing to the degradation of their preferred nesting habitats. The rate at which its population is decreasing has not yet been established.
