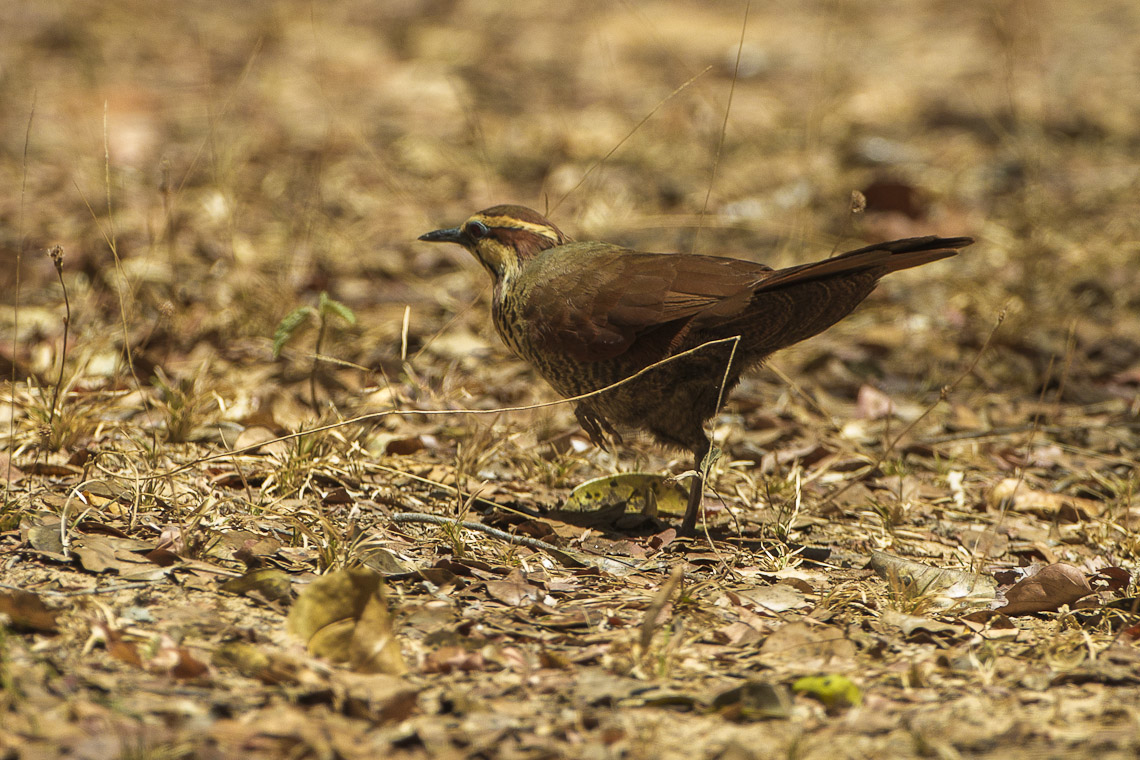

Conservation status
- Vulnerable (IUCN 3.1)

Scientific classification
- Kingdom: Animalia
- Phylum: Chordata
- Class: Aves
- Order: Mesitornithiformes
- Family: Mesitornithidae
- Genus: Mesitornis
- Species: M. variegatus

Binomial name
- Mesitornis variegatus (Geoffroy Saint-Hilaire, I, 1838)

= White-breasted mesite =

Species of bird

The white-breasted mesite or white-breasted roatelo (Mesitornis variegatus) is a ground-dwelling bird endemic to Madagascar. One of three species in the mesite family, Mesitornithidae, it is classified as vulnerable by the International Union for Conservation of Nature (IUCN). It has a small population and is restricted to five sites in the north and west of the island, and one in the east.

== Description ==
The white-breasted mesite is a medium-sized terrestrial bird which is often described as rail-like. The species has a white face with distinctive facial markings (a white supercilium and dark malar stripes) and a short dark straight bill. The upperparts are rufous brown, the underside is white with a tawny chest band and a barred belly. The wings are short and rounded and the bird only flies a few metres when pursued. It has a melodic song and sings in the early morning and during the day.

== Ecology ==
The white-breasted mesite is a forest species; living in groups of two to four individuals which can be seen resting, or feeding on the ground during the day. The brown upper plumage provides camouflage while the bird forage on the forest floor, flicking over leaf-litter to find invertebrates. Diet includes beetles, centipedes, cockroaches, crickets, flies, moths, spiders, and also seeds. Egg-laying mainly takes place from November to January with one to three white eggs with rust-coloured spots. The nests are a simple structure of interwoven twigs, within vegetation, and close to the ground.

== Distribution ==
The preferred habitat is undisturbed deciduous forest and the bird has a restricted distribution on five sites in the north and west of Madagascar, as well as one in the east, Ambatovaky Reserve. The northern and western sites are Analamerana Reserve, Ankarafantsika National Park, Ankarana Special Reserve, Daraina forests and Menabe forest.

== Status ==
The population of this species is declining and is projected to continue doing so. It is sensitive to disturbance, and its forest home is threatened by logging and forest fires. It is also subject to hunting pressure. The International Union for Conservation of Nature has classified the conservation status of this bird as ″vulnerable″.
