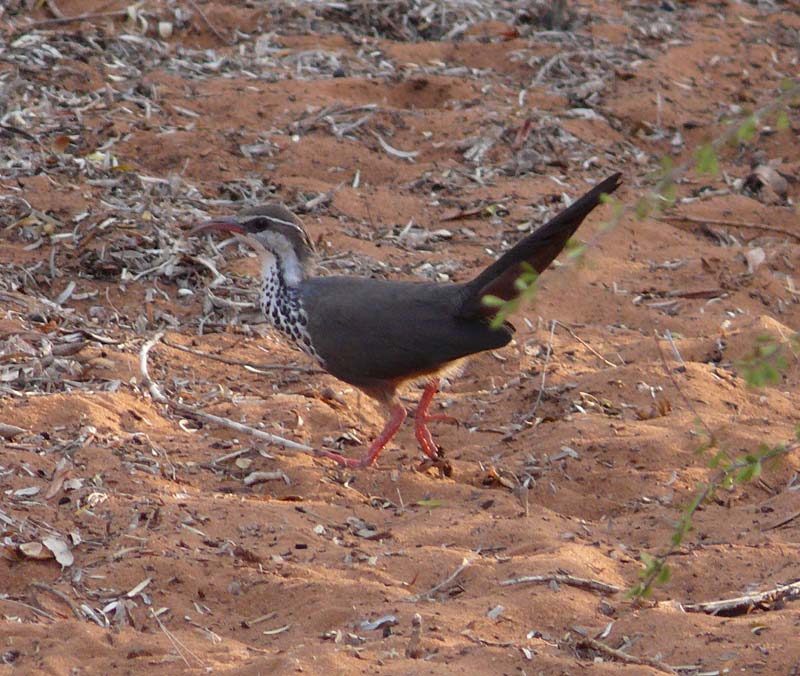
- Subdesert mesite (Monias benschi)

Scientific classification
- Kingdom: Animalia
- Phylum: Chordata
- Class: Aves
- Clade: Columbimorphae
- Order: Mesitornithiformes; Wetmore, 1960
- Family: Mesitornithidae; Wetmore, 1960

Genera
- Mesitornis; Monias; †Eomonias; †Footix
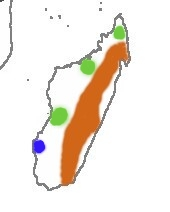
- Respective ranges: brown mesite in orange, white-breasted mesite in green and subdesert mesite in blue

= Mesite =

Mesites

Family of birds

The mesites (Mesitornithidae) are a family of birds that are part of a clade (Columbimorphae) that includes Columbiformes and Pterocliformes. They are somewhat small-bodied, flightless or near flightless birds endemic to Madagascar. All the species of this family have been affected by human activities and have been listed as vulnerable by the International Union for Conservation of Nature.

== Description ==
The mesites are forest and scrubland birds that feed on insects and seeds; brown and white-breasted mesites forage on the ground, gleaning insects from underneath leaves as well as low vegetation. The subdesert mesite uses its long bill to probe in the soil. Other birds, such as drongos and flycatchers, will follow mesites to catch any insects they flush out or miss. Mesites are vocal birds, with calls similar to that of a passerine's song, which are used for territorial defence. Two or three white eggs are laid in a stick-built nest located in a bush or on a low branch. The Mesitornis species are monogamous while Monias benschi is polygamous and, unlike the other two, shows significant sexual dichromatism.

== Systematics ==
There are two genera, Mesitornis (2 species) and Monias (subdesert mesite).

Image	Genus	Species
	Monias Oustalet & Grandidier, 1903	Subdesert mesite Monias benschi Oustalet & Grandidier, 1903
	Mesitornis Bonaparte, 1855 [Mesites Geoffroy, 1838 non Schoenherr, 1838; Mesoenas Reichenbach, 1861]	White-breasted mesite, Mesitornis variegatus (Saint-Hilaire, 1838); Brown mesite, Mesitornis unicolor (Des Murs, 1845)

Historically, mesites' phylogenetic relationships were not very clear; they have been allied (claded) with the Gruiformes, Turniciformes and Columbiformes.

Some phylogenomic studies support Pterocliformes (sandgrouse) as the sister group of mesites while others place this clade with another clade constituted of Columbiformes and Cuculiformes (cuckoos).

- - Columbiformes (pigeons)
  - - Pterocliformes (sandgrouses)
    - Mesitornithiformes (mesites)

Phylogenetic relationship of the mesites within Neoaves according to Stiller and colleagues (2024).
