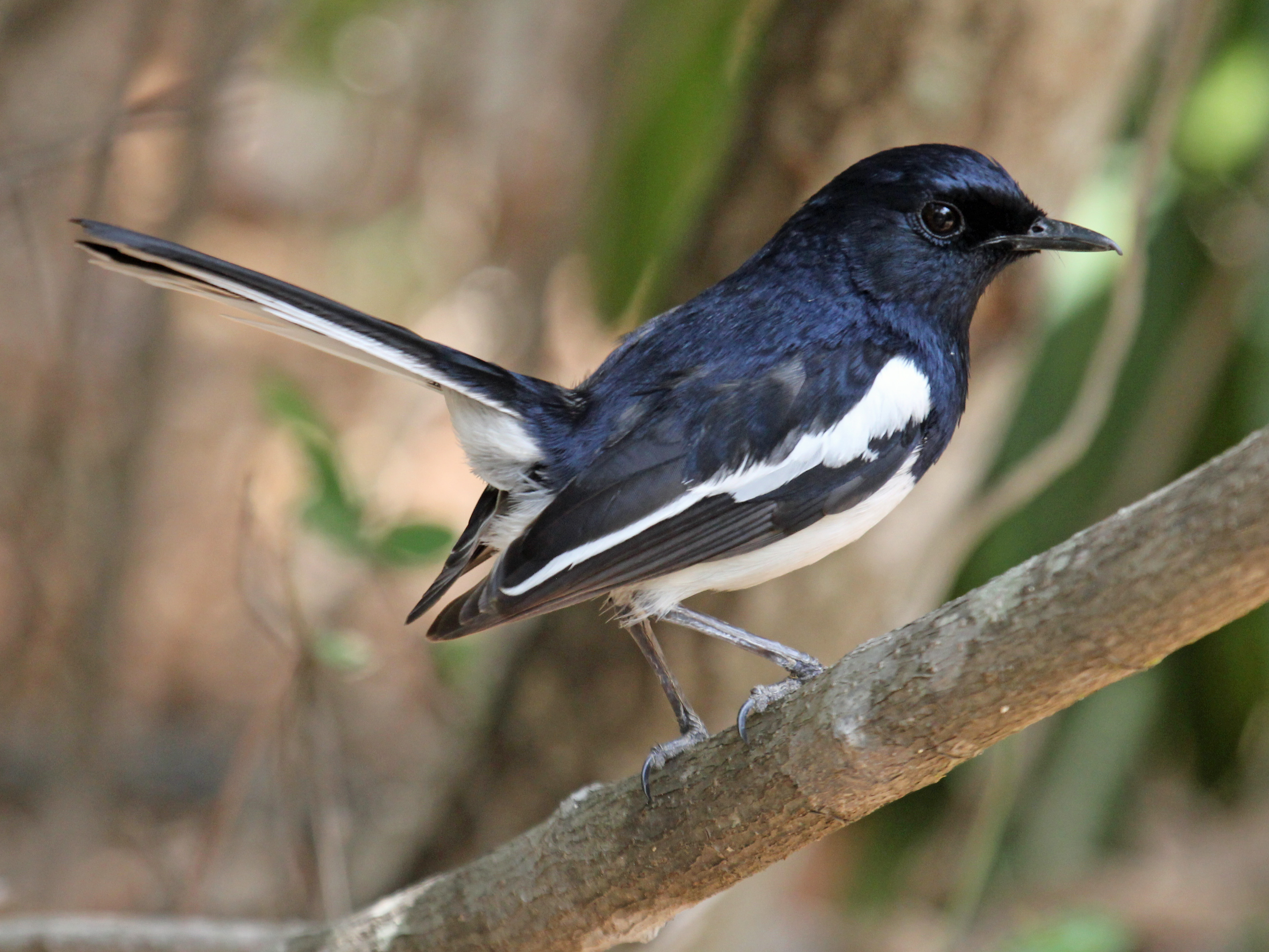
- Male near Isalo
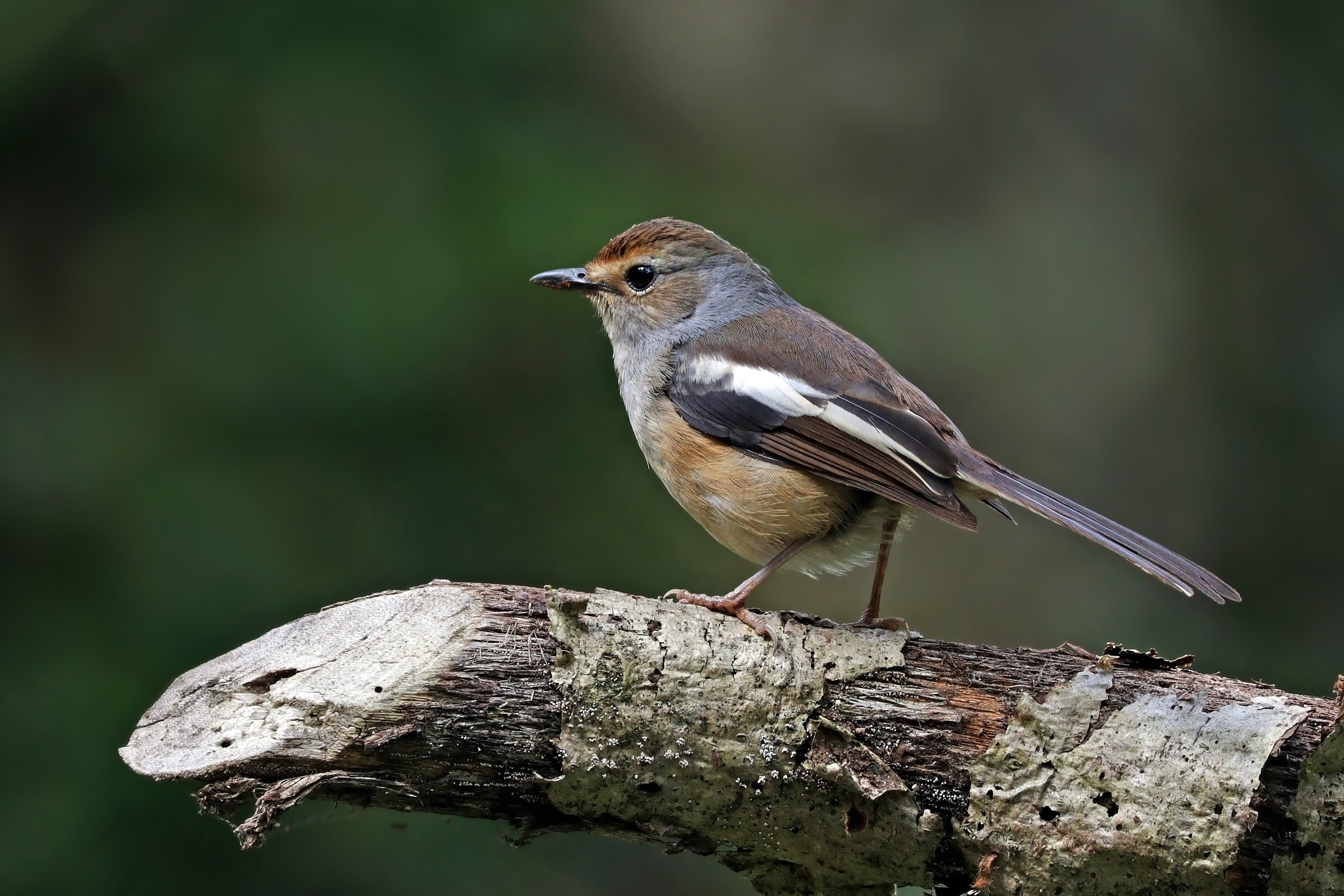
- Female in Montagne d'Ambre National Park; both C. a. pica

Conservation status
- Least Concern (IUCN 3.1)

Scientific classification
- Kingdom: Animalia
- Phylum: Chordata
- Class: Aves
- Order: Passeriformes
- Family: Muscicapidae
- Genus: Copsychus
- Species: C. albospecularis

Binomial name
- Copsychus albospecularis (Eydoux & Gervais, 1836)

= Madagascar magpie-robin =

Species of bird

The Madagascar magpie-robin (Copsychus albospecularis) is a species of chat in the Old World flycatcher family, Muscicapidae.

== Taxonomy and systematics ==
The Madagascar magpie-robin is closely related to the Seychelles magpie-robin and the Oriental magpie-robin, and may form a superspecies with them. The species is endemic to Madagascar, where it is found across the island. Its distribution is sometimes scattered, as it occupies a wide range of habitats and can be very common or fairly rare depending on this. Three subspecies have been described: the nominate subspecies from northeastern Madagascar, C. a. inexpectatus from eastern and southeastern Madagascar and C. a. pica , which occupies the rest of the country. There is, however, considerable overlap between the subspecies and the exact boundaries between their ranges is unclear.

== Description ==
The Madagascar magpie-robin is around 18 cm (7 in) in length and weighs 21 to 24 g (0.74–0.85 oz). The plumage varies by sex; the male of the nominate subspecies has all-black plumage with a white shoulder patch and the female has a grey-brown crown, back and tail, grey-breast and throat and rufous wings and rump. The males of the other two subspecies have more white of the wings and a white abdomen; the female of C. a. pica is much paler overall.

== Distribution and habitat ==
Madagascar magpie-robins occupy most of the habitats available on the island, from scrubland to dry monsoon forest, humid rainforest, forest edge, mangrove forests, secondary growth, as well as a variety of agricultural land including gardens, banana, coffee and eucalyptus plantations. They can be found from sea level to 1,800 m (5,900 ft).

== Behaviour ==
=== Diet and feeding ===
The Madagascar magpie-robin feeds in insects, including cockroaches, beetles, bugs and grasshoppers, as well as spiders, earthworms, small lizards, and amphibians. They will also take berries. They forage near the ground, and exhibit some niche differentiation between the sexes, with females feeding more regularly on the ground and males feeding higher up in the undergrowth. They also sometimes join mixed-species foraging flocks.

=== Breeding ===
Madagascar magpie-robins are territorial, with pairs defending territories that vary in size depending on habitat type, ranging from less than 1 ha (2.5 acres) to 6 ha (15 acres). Territories in heavy rainforest or moist montane forest are smaller than those in scrubland. The nest is a cup made from grasses, leaf stalks and lined with rootlets, snakeskin and the hair of lemurs or cattle. The nest is placed in cavities in walls, in hollows in stumps or in dense vegetation. An average clutch size is three eggs (the range is from two to five) and these are incubated for about 13 days. Both parents feed the chicks in the nest for 17 days, and the young continue to be fed outside the nest for at least another six days. Chicks may associate with their parents in small flocks for at least 18 days after fledging. This species is often targeted by the predatory Madagascar sparrowhawk.
