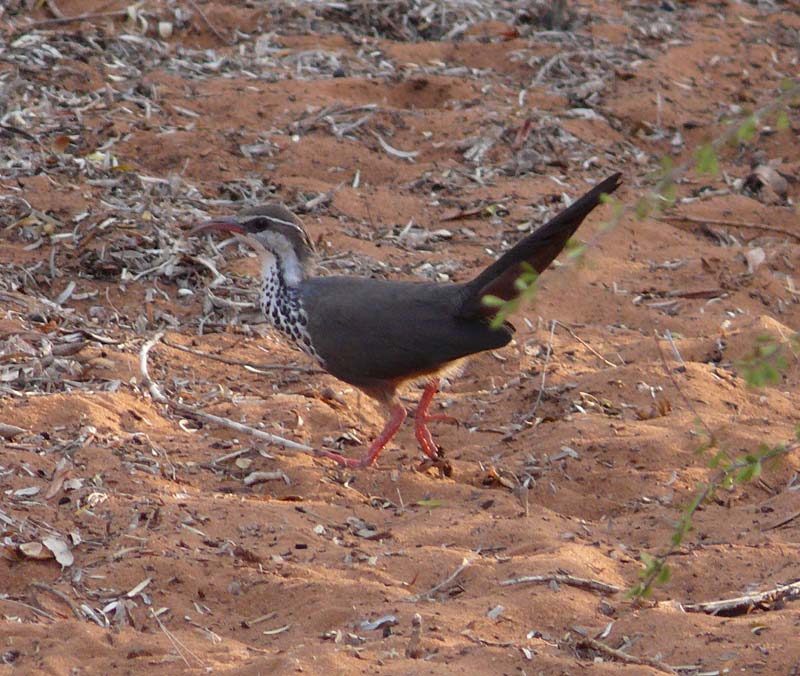
- male

Conservation status
- Vulnerable (IUCN 3.1)

Scientific classification
- Kingdom: Animalia
- Phylum: Chordata
- Class: Aves
- Order: Mesitornithiformes
- Family: Mesitornithidae
- Genus: Monias; Oustalet & Grandidier, G, 1903
- Species: M. benschi

Binomial name
- Monias benschi Oustalet & Grandidier, G, 1903

= Subdesert mesite =

Species of bird

The subdesert mesite (Monias benschi) is a ground-dwelling bird endemic to Madagascar. It is one of three species in the mesite family Mesitornithidae, and is restricted in distribution to a small low-land region in southwest Madagascar.

== Description ==
The subdesert mesite is a medium-sized terrestrial bird which is often described as rail-like. The species has a long and downward-curved bill distinguishing it from the other members of the family. Both sexes are greyish above and show thin white eyebrows. Both have white underparts; the male has black crescent-shaped spots on the side of the neck and upper breast. The female has rufous spots that may merge into a general rufous tone, and has a tawny cheek patch.

== Distribution and habitat ==
The subdesert mesite is restricted to spiny thicket with open areas, from sea-level to an altitude of 130 m (430 ft). It is restricted to the 200 km (124.3 mi) long, and 30 to 60 km (18.6 to 37.3 mi) wide, coastal strip between the Fiherenana river and the Mangoky river, in the south-west of Madagascar. To the north of Manombo there is an area of circa 2,500 km^{2} (965 sq mi) where the habitat is still suitable; elsewhere the habitat is becoming fragmented.

== Behaviour and ecology ==
The subdesert mesite forages by picking invertebrates, seeds and fruit off the ground and may dig into the surface. The birds nests are exposed platforms of twigs built in a bush within 2 m (6.6 ft) of the ground. One or two eggs are laid and the incubation and care of the young is shared by both sexes. They may be polyandrous or polygynous. The birds live in communal groups and have a loud ″nak! nak!″ alarm call when disturbed.

== Status ==
The population of this species may be dense within its restricted geographic range. It is vulnerable to habitat degradation, by slash-and-burn cultivation of maize, burning for charcoal, commercial timber and for construction. which is happening in most of its range apart from to the north of Manombo. The birds are also taken by dogs, by hunting, and introduced rats (Rattus sp) may also be a problem. As of 2021, the population is estimated to be 65,000-110,000 mature individuals, and this population is believed to be decreasing. The International Union for Conservation of Nature has classified the conservation status of this bird as ″vulnerable″.
