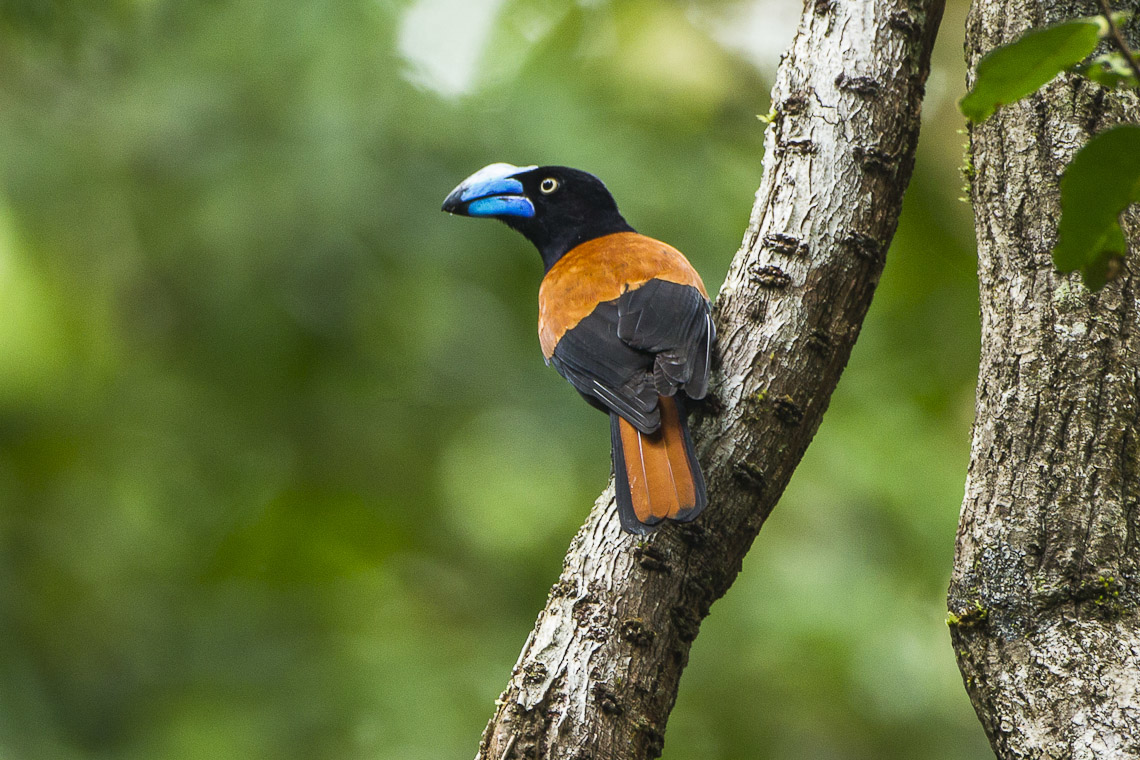
- Helmet vanga (Euryceros prevostii)

Scientific classification
- Kingdom: Animalia
- Phylum: Chordata
- Class: Aves
- Order: Passeriformes
- Infraorder: Corvides
- Superfamily: Malaconotoidea

Families
- See text

Synonyms
- Malaconotidea

= Malaconotoidea =

Superfamily of birds

Malaconotoidea is a superfamily of passerine birds. They contain a large diversity of omnivorous and carnivorous songbirds widespread in Africa (including particularly Madagascar), southern Asia, and Australasia, many of which superficially resemble shrikes in behaviour. It was defined and named by Cracraft and colleagues in 2004 and contains the bushshrikes (Malaconotidae), helmetshrikes (Prionopidae), ioras (Aegithinidae), vangas (Vangidae) and the Australian butcherbirds, magpies, currawongs and woodswallows (Artamidae). Molecular analysis in 2006 added the Bornean bristlehead to the group, though its position in the Malconotoidea is unclear. It was initially thought related to the butcherbirds and woodswallows but now is thought to be an early offshoot.

In 2012, Jerome Fuchs and colleagues extensively analysed the Malaconotoidea (called by them Malaconotidea), using both mitochondrial and nuclear DNA. The resulting tree suggested that the group originated in Australasia and prolifically diversified in Africa after an ancestor crossed to Africa between 45 and 33.7 million years ago during the late Eocene. This is based on the basal position of group comprising the woodswallows and butcherbirds and allies and (most likely) the boatbills. Complicating the picture is that some Malaysian species such as the Bornean bristlehead, flycatcher-shrikes, the philentomas, and woodshrikes appear to be more closely related to African species.

A cladistic study of the bony characteristics of the skulls of various Malaconotoidea and relatives, and focussing on vangas, published in 2008, found broad agreement in the inclusion of woodswallows, butcherbirds and vangas in Malaconotoidea, but also yielded some results at odds with other studies, notably that red-backed shrike, crested drongo and magpie-lark were nested within the group. The authors conceded that there were not enough data to conclude these species should be placed here.

The superfamily contains eight or nine families, comprising 46 genera and about 140 species:

- Machaerirhynchidae – boatbills
- Artamidae – woodswallows, butcherbirds, currawongs, and Australian magpie (including Cracticidae, sometimes treated as a separate family)
- Rhagologidae – mottled berryhunter
- Malaconotidae – puffback shrikes, bush shrikes, gonoleks, tchagras, and boubous
- Pityriaseidae – bristlehead
- Aegithinidae – ioras
- Platysteiridae – wattle-eyes and batises
- Vangidae – vangas

The species vary in size from the tiny 8–9 cm pygmy batis up to the large 50 cm black currawong. Some groups are plain-coloured, notably the Artamidae, almost all of which are either grey or pied, while others are brightly coloured, notably among the bush shrikes and gonoleks in Malaconotidae.
