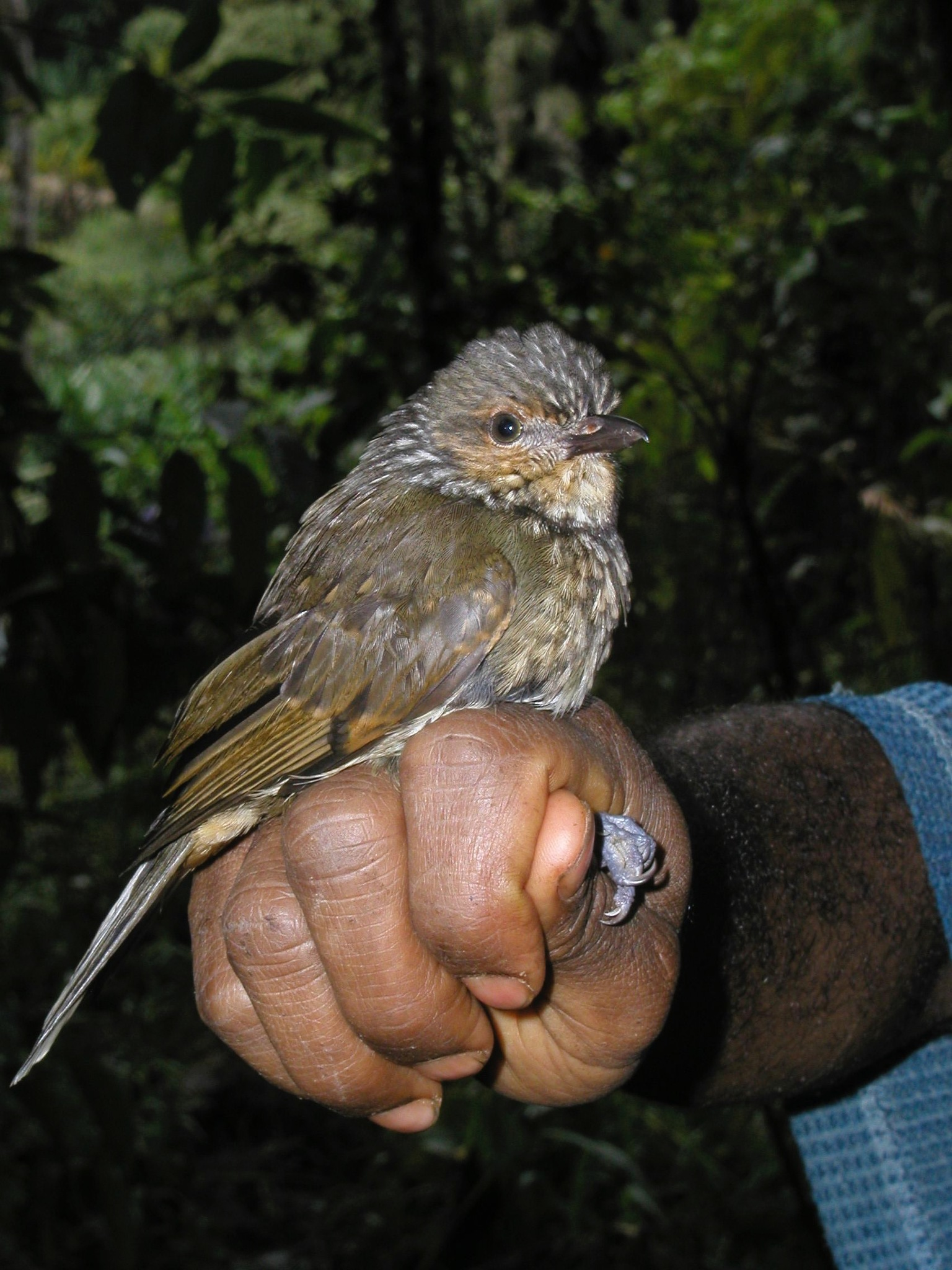

Conservation status
- Least Concern (IUCN 3.1)

Scientific classification
- Kingdom: Animalia
- Phylum: Chordata
- Class: Aves
- Order: Passeriformes
- Superfamily: Malaconotoidea
- Family: Rhagologidae; Schodde & Christidis, 2014
- Genus: Rhagologus; Stresemann & Paludan, 1934
- Species: R. leucostigma

Binomial name
- Rhagologus leucostigma (Salvadori, 1876)

= Mottled berryhunter =

Species of bird

The mottled berryhunter or mottled whistler (Rhagologus leucostigma) is a species of bird that is monotypic within the genus Rhagologus and family Rhagologidae. The species was long thought to be a member of the Pachycephalidae on the basis of its appearance, but genetic studies have now found it is not related to that family. It is endemic to the highlands of New Guinea, where its natural habitat is tropical moist montane forests.

== Taxonomy and systematics ==
The mottled berryhunter described by Italian ornithologist Tommaso Salvadori in 1876, who placed it in the whistler genus Pachycephala. The specific name he gave the species, leucostigma, is derived from the Ancient Greek leukos for white and stigma for spot. It was moved to its own genus, Rhagologus, in 1934 by Erwin Stresemann & Knud Paludan, the genus name referring to the Greek word rhagologos meaning berry-gathering. The species was long treated as a member of the whistler family Pachycephalidae, due to its general resemblance to members of that family. Several studies of the genetics of songbirds found it was not related to them, but instead placed closer to families such as the vangas, ioras or butcherbirds and woodswallows (Artamidae). Among these groups no clear close relatives have been identified either genetically or morphologically, so in 2014 Richard Schodde and Leslie Christidis placed the mottled berryhunter in its own monotypic family Rhagologidae.

== Description ==
The mottled berryhunter is a small songbird, measuring 15 to 16.5 cm (5.9–6.5 in) in length and weighing between 24–29 g (0.85–1.02 oz). The plumage varies by sex, with the male having a grey forehead, with the feathers tipped in white, and crown with a dull rufous face and white lores. The neck is olive-brown, as are the other upperparts. The chin is rufous and the breat yellowish white with dusky tips. The female has a more pronounced rufous face and extensive streaking in the crown, and the underparts are lighter with more pronounced edging.

== Distribution and habitat ==
The mottled berryhunter is endemic to the island of New Guinea, where it is found in montane forest from 820–2,900 m (2,690–9,510 ft), most typically 1,500–2,550 m (4,920–8,370 ft). It principally occupies primary forest, but will occupy secondaty forest as well. The species is not thought to be migratory, and is uncommon across its range.

== Behaviour ==
The mottled berryhunter is a poorly studied species and little is known about its habits. The species feeds on small berries, as its name suggests, but also insects. All that is known about the timing of its breeding is that males in breeding condition have been collected in July. Its nest is a cup woven into small branches on the edge of a tree, 4 m (13 ft) off the ground. The nest is constructed from plant tendrils and mosses, and measures 13 to 14 cm (5.1–5.5 in) across and has a depth of 10 to 11 cm (3.9–4.3 in).

== Status ==
The mottled berrypecker is uncommon across its range, although it is an inconspicuous bird and may frequently be overlooked. The species has a wide distribution across New Guinea and while it is dependent on forest habitat that has suffered some losses to logging, it has not been assessed as declining and has been listed as least concern by the International Union for Conservation of Nature.
