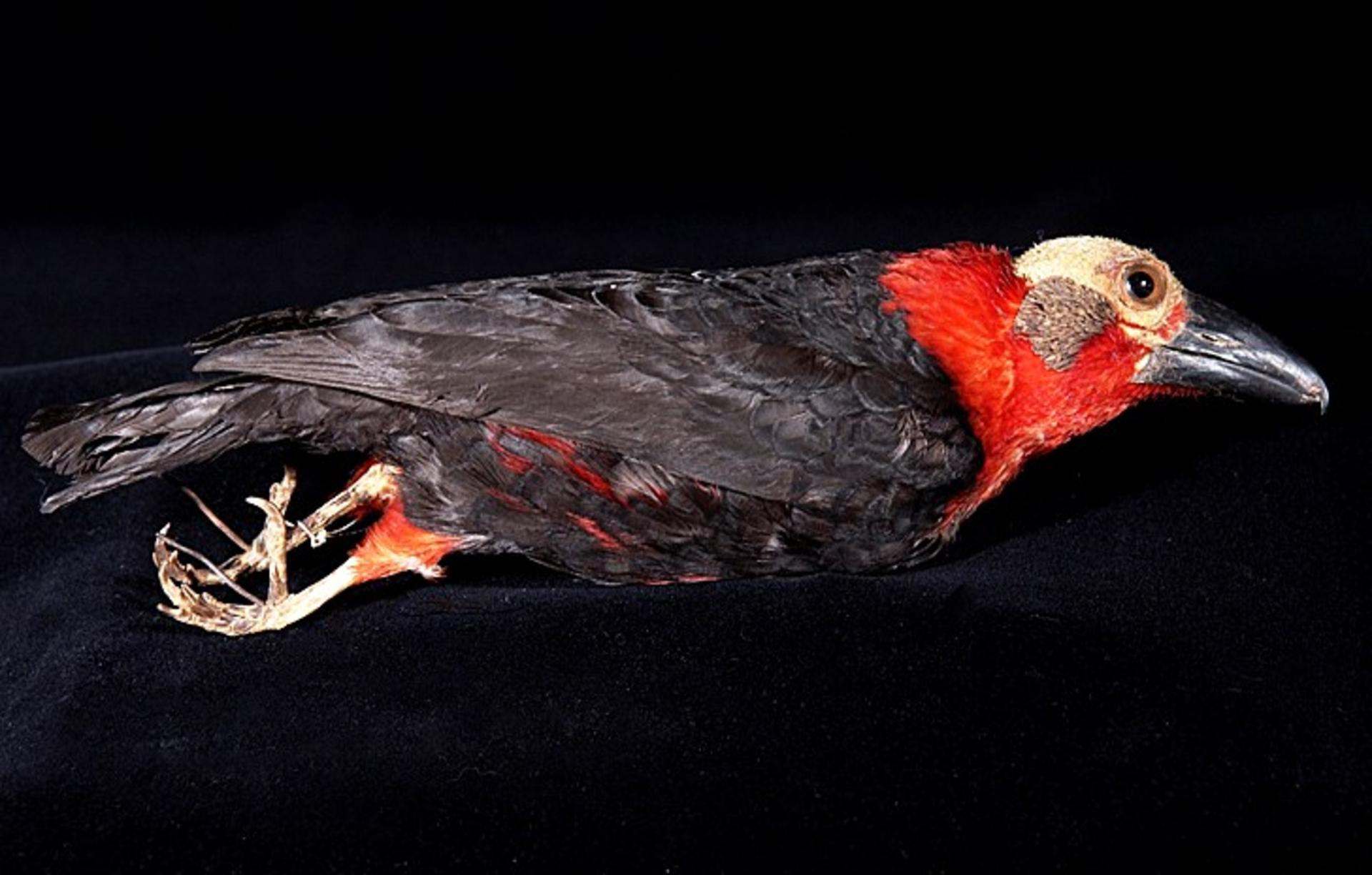

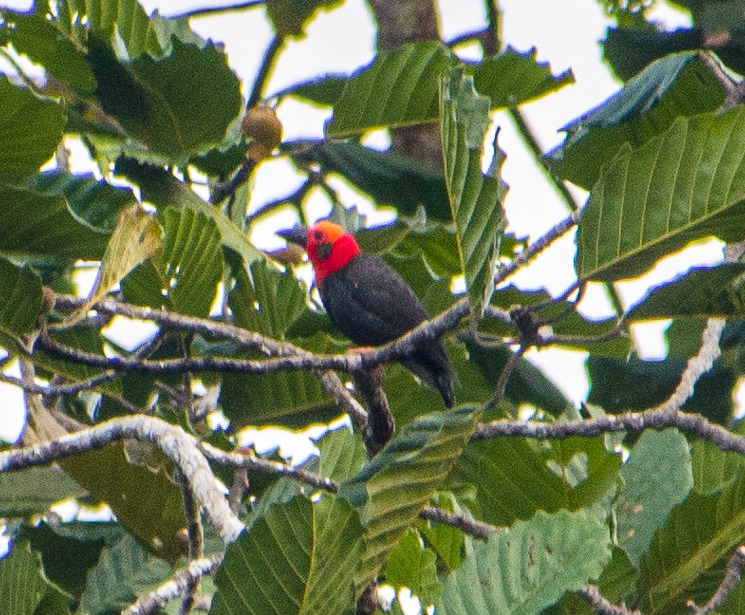
- Museum specimen above (Naturalis), living individual below (Sepilok)

Conservation status
- Vulnerable (IUCN 3.1)

Scientific classification
- Kingdom: Animalia
- Phylum: Chordata
- Class: Aves
- Order: Passeriformes
- Superfamily: Malaconotoidea
- Family: Pityriasidae; Mayr & Amadon, 1951
- Genus: Pityriasis; Lesson, 1839
- Species: P. gymnocephala

Binomial name
- Pityriasis gymnocephala (Temminck, 1836)

= Bornean bristlehead =

Species of bird

The Bornean bristlehead (Pityriasis gymnocephala), also variously known as the bristled shrike, bald-headed crow or the bald-headed wood-shrike, is the only member of the passerine family Pityriasidae and genus Pityriasis. This enigmatic and vulnerable species is endemic to the southeast Asian island of Borneo, where it lives in small groups in the rainforest canopy.

== Taxonomy ==
The relationships of this species have been controversial. At times it has been placed in the Prionopidae, the Cracticidae, the Artamidae or the Corvidae. A more recent suggestion has been to include it in the Tephrodornithidae, a new family that includes Hemipus and Tephrodornis.

== Description ==
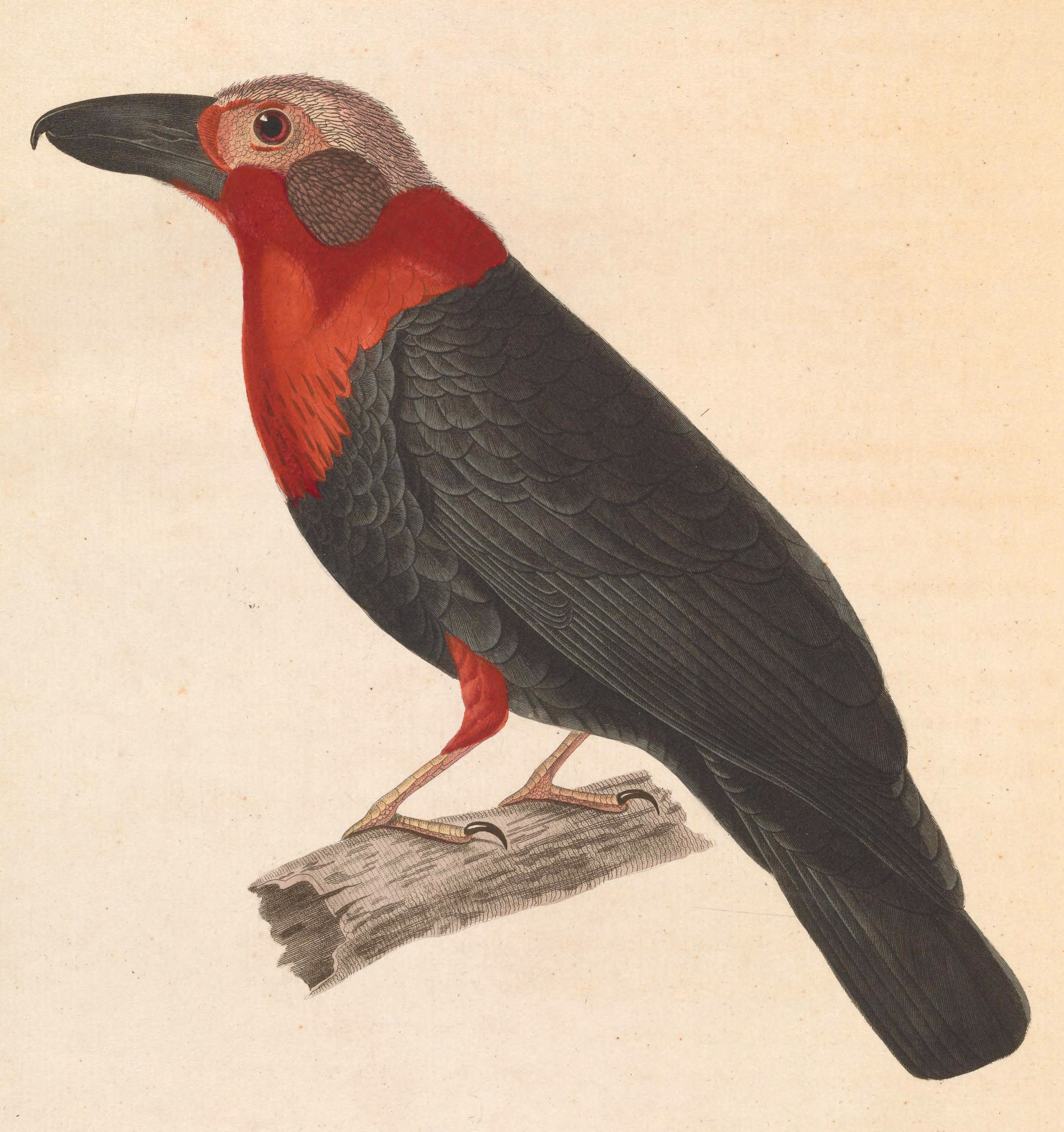
1838 drawing

The Bornean bristlehead is a medium-sized bird, c. 25 cm (9.8 in) in length. It is mostly black, with bright red thighs, head, throat and neck, and grey ear-coverts. The featherless crown is deep yellow and covered in short, 3–4 mm long, bristle-like skin projections, giving it a bald appearance from afar. This gives the species its common name "bristlehead", genus name Pityriasis (from Greek, "having dandruff") and specific name gymnocephala (from Greek, "bald-headed"). Red flank patches are present in all females and some males, but can be covered by the wings when perched. There is a white wing-patch at the base of the primaries, visible in flight. It has a massive heavy black hooked bill and a short tail, giving it a chunky appearance.

Juveniles have entirely or mostly black thighs, a more orange-red head and neck, orange-red ear-coverts, some red mottling to the underparts, a few red feathers on the crown and undeveloped bristles.

It is a noisy species making a variety of unmusical calls, including distinctive high-pitched nasal whining notes interspersed with harsher notes, chattering noises, whistles, honks and chortles.

== Distribution and habitat ==
The bristlehead is endemic to the island of Borneo where it is widespread, but generally sparse and patchy in occurrence, although it can be locally common. It mainly lives in lowlands, but also occurs in hilly areas up to 1,200 m (3,900 ft) above mean sea level. It can be found in the canopy of both primary and secondary forests, including peat swamp forests, mixed dipterocarp forests and mangrove forests.

== Behaviour ==
The Bornean bristlehead is a sociable species which often moves steadily in small garrulous flocks of up to 10 birds in the mid and upper canopy of the forest, sometimes accompanied by other large or medium-sized forest birds such as malkohas, babblers, drongos, trogons, woodpeckers and hornbills in mixed-species feeding flocks. Its movements in the canopy are slow and heavy and it flies with a fast, shallow wing-beat.

=== Feeding ===
Bornean bristleheads feed primarily on animal prey, mainly large insects and other arthropods, but also small vertebrates like lizards and frogs. Prey is gleaned from foliage, twigs, branches and trunks at canopy to mid-levels of the forest. It occasionally takes fruits.

=== Breeding ===
Breeding behaviour is largely unknown, though an oviduct egg was described as being white with grey and brown spots and with dimensions of 31 x 25 mm. A sighting of two apparent females feeding a fledgling has been interpreted as suggesting communal breeding. Birds have also been seen in flight carrying nesting material.

== Conservation ==
The Bornean bristlehead is considered vulnerable due to the rapid and ongoing deforestation in Borneo, along with burning of peat swamp forest. The principal habitat of the species is Borneo's lowland forests, where an estimated 2.5% is lost each year (based on reviews covering 2015–2020). It occurs in a number of protected areas, but some of these are also targeted by illegal logging.
