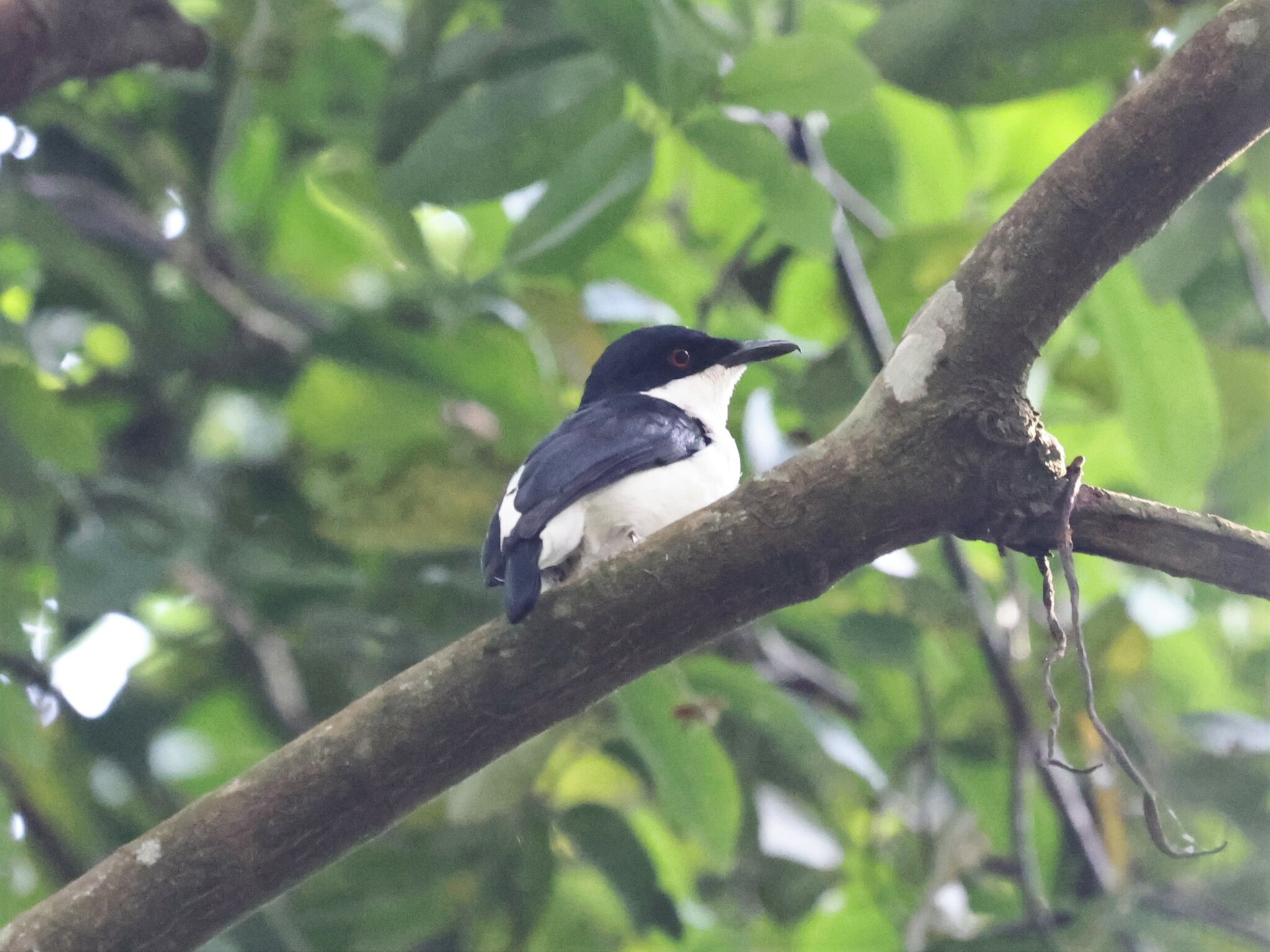
- Male
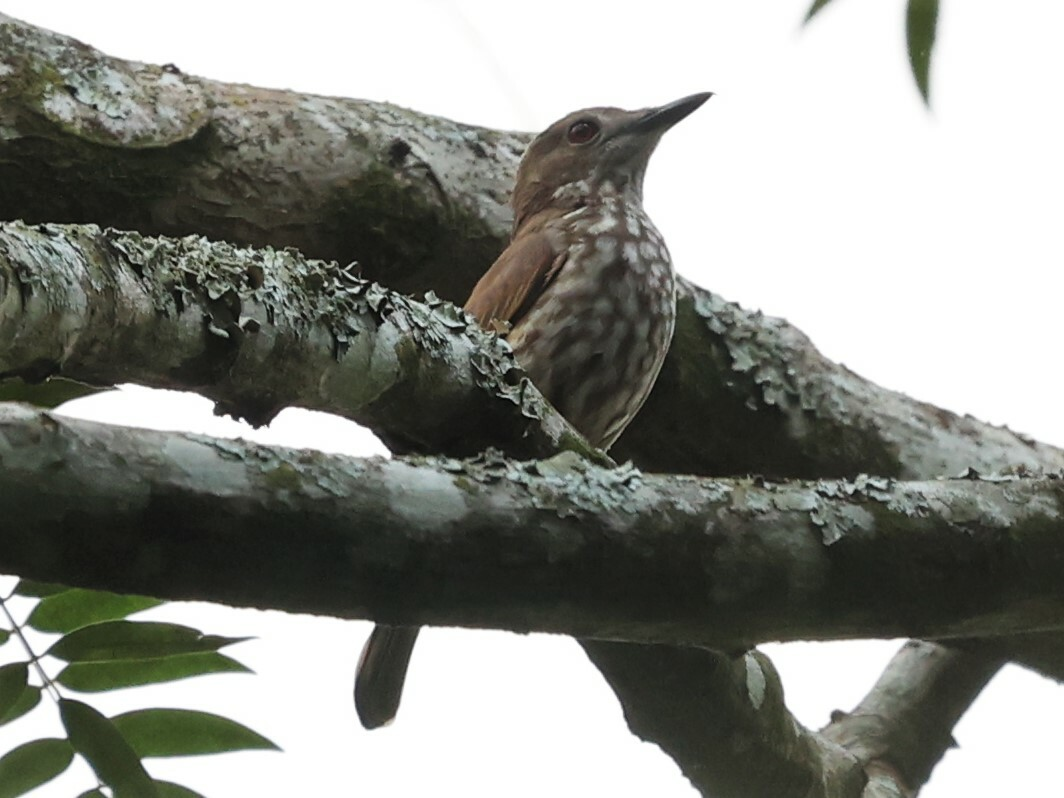
- Female

Conservation status
- Least Concern (IUCN 3.1)

Scientific classification
- Kingdom: Animalia
- Phylum: Chordata
- Class: Aves
- Order: Passeriformes
- Family: Vangidae
- Genus: Megabyas; Verreaux & Verreaux, 1855
- Species: M. flammulatus

Binomial name
- Megabyas flammulatus Verreaux, J & Verreaux, É, 1855

Synonyms
- Bias flammulatus

= African shrike-flycatcher =

Species of bird

The African shrike-flycatcher or red-eyed shrike-flycatcher (Megabyas flammulatus) is a species of bird in the vanga family Vangidae. It is the only species in the monotypic genus Megabyas.

== Taxonomy ==
The African shrike-flycatcher was described by the French naturalists Jules Verreaux and Édouard Verreaux in 1855, who placed it in its own genus, Megabyas. Over the years, the species was sometimes lumped with the closely related black-and-white shrike-flycatcher in the genus Bias, another widespread African species similar in size, plumage and skull shape. The genus name is derived from the Ancient Greek word mega for large and Bias for the genus it was evidently related to.

The African shrike-flycatcher was once lumped with many other families of birds in Muscicapidae, the Old World flycatchers. Within that enlarged family, it was placed with the monarch-flycatchers until 1970 when it was identified as closer to the wattle-eye and batises in the present day family Platysteiridae. A 2004 analysis of the genetics of the species along with other members of the family showed that it, along with the genus Bias, were actually embedded in the Vangidae, a family previously thought to be endemic to the island of Madagascar. The same study confirmed that Megabyas and Bias are closely related but diverged sufficiently to be retained in two separate genera.

Two subspecies of African shrike-flycatcher are currently accepted, the nominate race in West Africa and M. f. aequatorialis in Central Africa. A third subspecies, M. f.carolathi, has been described from Angola, but is usually lumped with M. f. aequatorialis.

== Description ==
The African shrike-flycatcher is a small, 16 cm (6.3 in), songbird with an upright flycatcher-like shape and a broad and hooked bill. The plumage varies between the males and females. Males have dark blue-black upperparts and a white throat, breast, belly and rump. The eyes are red coloured, the bill black, and the legs reddish-purple. In contrast the female has a brown head, rufous brown back and tail, and the underparts are white streaked with brown.

== Distribution and habitat ==
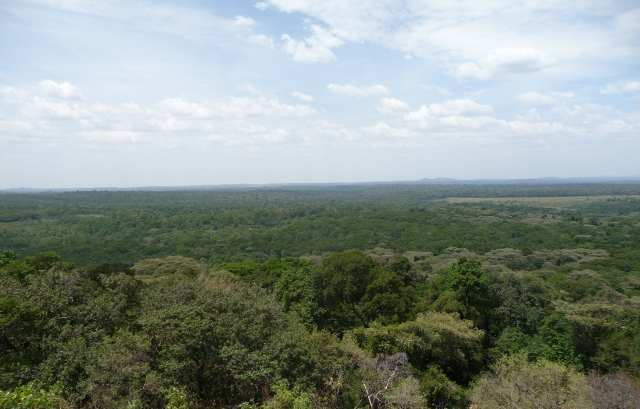
Kakamega Forest in Kenya represents the easternmost edge of their range

It is widespread across the African tropical rainforests from sea-level to 2,150 m (7,050 ft). It ranges from Sierra Leone in West Africa east to Kakamega Forest in Kenya and south to Angola. It can occupy a range of forested habitats, from primary forest, secondary forest, forest edge habitats, and old plantations. Within the forest it can be found in the undergrowth, mid-story and canopy. It is suspected that the species is an intra-African migrant, but the details are poorly understood. For example, it is only present in NE Gabon from November to March, and is only present in Kenya during the non-breeding season.

== Behaviour ==
=== Diet and feeding ===
The African shrike-flycatcher forages in trees for insect prey, which can include beetles, grasshoppers and locusts, and moths and butterflies. Prey is caught on the wing, with the bird flying to a location and hovering before snatching prey. Unlike true flycatchers, the African shrike-flycatcher will hop and even run on branches as well. It will often join mixed-species feeding flocks in the forest canopy, sometimes also in the lower stories of the forest at the forest edge.

=== Breeding ===
The African shrike-flycatcher is a seasonal breeder, although the exact timing varies across its range. Pairs or possibly family groups defend a territory and construct a nest in the fork of a branch of the trunk of the tree, usually high in the tree (35–40 m (115–131 ft)). The breeding behaviour is poorly understood due to the difficulty in observing nests in the canopy. The nest is a simple cup, 4 cm (1.6 in) in diameter and 1.5 cm (0.59 in) in depth, made of flakes of bark and lichens held together and attached to the branch with spider webs. In the one nest that has been studied in detail, the family group consisted of one female and two males, suggesting that the species may receive help with nesting. Both sexes participated in incubation, but it was not possible to establish if both or only one male incubated. During the early phase of incubation the male undertakes most of the incubation but during the incubation phase the female takes on more of those responsibilities.
