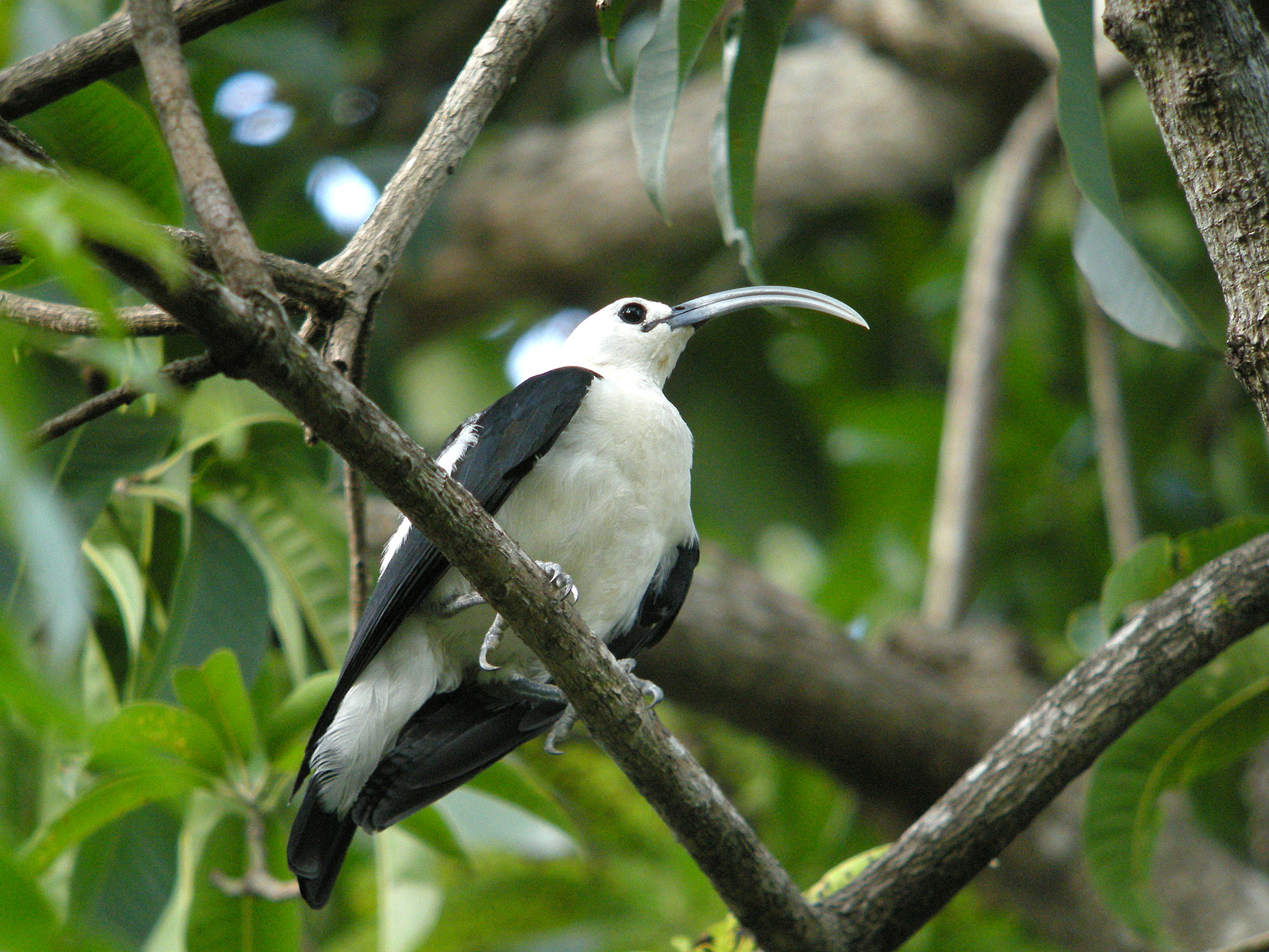

Conservation status
- Least Concern (IUCN 3.1)

Scientific classification
- Kingdom: Animalia
- Phylum: Chordata
- Class: Aves
- Order: Passeriformes
- Family: Vangidae
- Genus: Falculea; I. Geoffroy Saint-Hilaire, 1836
- Species: F. palliata

Binomial name
- Falculea palliata Geoffroy Saint-Hilaire, 1836

= Sickle-billed vanga =

Species of bird

The sickle-billed vanga (Falculea palliata) is a species of bird in the vanga family Vangidae. It is monotypic within the genus Falculea. It is endemic to Madagascar. Its natural habitats are tropical dry forests and tropical dry shrubland.

== Taxonomy ==
The sickle-billed vanga was described by Isidore Geoffroy Saint-Hilaire in 1836, who also erected the genus Falculea to place it in. There are no subspecies. Like many members of the vanga family it was previously placed in another family by early scientists. In the case of this species it was placed with the crows and jays in Corvidae by H. Gadow in the 1883 Catalogue of the British Museum. Within the Vangidae it seems that the closest relatives are the Bernier's vanga (Oriolia bernieri), the white-headed vanga (Artamella virdis) and the three species in the genus Xenopirostris. It is thought that the sickle-billed vanga split from the white-headed vanga around 1.1 million years ago. The two species share similar plumage but are very different in size and bill shape, reflecting the wide plasticity in body shape and feeding ecology in the vanga radiation. Both species, as well as their other close relatives, also share a unique intense black colouration in the mouth.

== Description ==
The sickle-billed vanga is the largest of the vangas, measuring 32 cm (13 in) in length and weighing 106 to 119 g (3.7–4.2 oz). The most striking feature is the bill, which is strongly decurved and measures 77 mm (3.0 in) and is blue-grey fading to ivory at the tip. The plumage is striking, with a white head, breast and belly and the back, wings and tail being black with a blue sheen. The iris is brown and the orbital ring around the eye is black. The legs are strong and coloured dark grey to pale blue. There is no sexual dimorphism. Juveniles are similar to adults but the black feathers on the back and wings are tipped with buff.

== Distribution and habitat ==
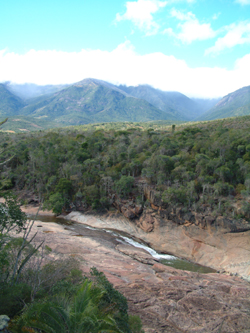
Andohahela National Park is one of many national parks that holds the sickle-billed vanga

The sickle-billed vanga is endemic to Madagascar, where it is found throughout the western side of the island. It ranges from sea-level up to 900 metres (3,000 ft). It is found in dry deciduous forest as well as thorn-forest. It can also be found in open savanna and in wooded areas around villages. The species is non-migratory.

The species is common within its range and is protected by a number of national parks, including Andohahela National Park, Ankarafantsika National Park, and Berenty Reserve. As such it is evaluated as Least Concern by the IUCN.

== Behaviour ==
=== Diet and feeding ===
The sickle-billed vanga is a social species, particularly in the tiding flea season when it can travel in groups of up to thirty birds while foraging for food and form roosting groups of over fifty birds. These flocks become smaller during the breeding season, but retain a small group of non-breeders that forage together over a wide area. They will form mixed-species foraging flocks with the related white-headed vanga and the crested drongo. The species feeds on a wide range of terrestrial invertebrates, including spiders, cockroaches, crickets, beetles, and worms. Small vertebrates, including chameleons and geckos, are also part of the diet and are also fed to nestlings. They generally feed in trees and particularly favour large branches, and will probe their long bill deep into holes and use it to lever off bark to get at concealed prey, occupying part of the niche usually filled by woodpeckers, which are absent from Madagascar (they do not fully fill the niche as they do not hammer the wood for prey).

=== Breeding ===
The sickle-billed vanga is apparently a seasonal breeder, with the season running from October to January in Ankarafantsika National Park in the north western part of the island. This coincides with the end of the dry season. The species is one of the vangas that has a polyandrous breeding system, where one female will mate with two or more males and all are responsible for raising the young. It is the female that engages in courtship displays, approaching the male and quivering her wings while holding the body in a horizontal posture. The male does not perform any display in return. Sickle-billed vangas are territorial and the males in the group will defend the territory from rivals and from potential or actual predators.

The nest is atypical for the family, consisting of a large untidy bowl of twigs, 30–40 centimetres (12–16 in) in diameter, situated 9–16 metres (30–52 ft) off the ground in the fork of a tree. The inner structure is lined with more delicate material. It is constructed by both sexes, but more work is done by the female. The clutch consists of three or four eggs, which are creamy white with mottling (particularly towards the larger end of the egg). Both sexes incubate the eggs, and feed and brood the chicks, but as with nest construction the female does more of the work than the males. The incubation period is 16 to 18 days, and chicks fledge after 19 to 23 days.
