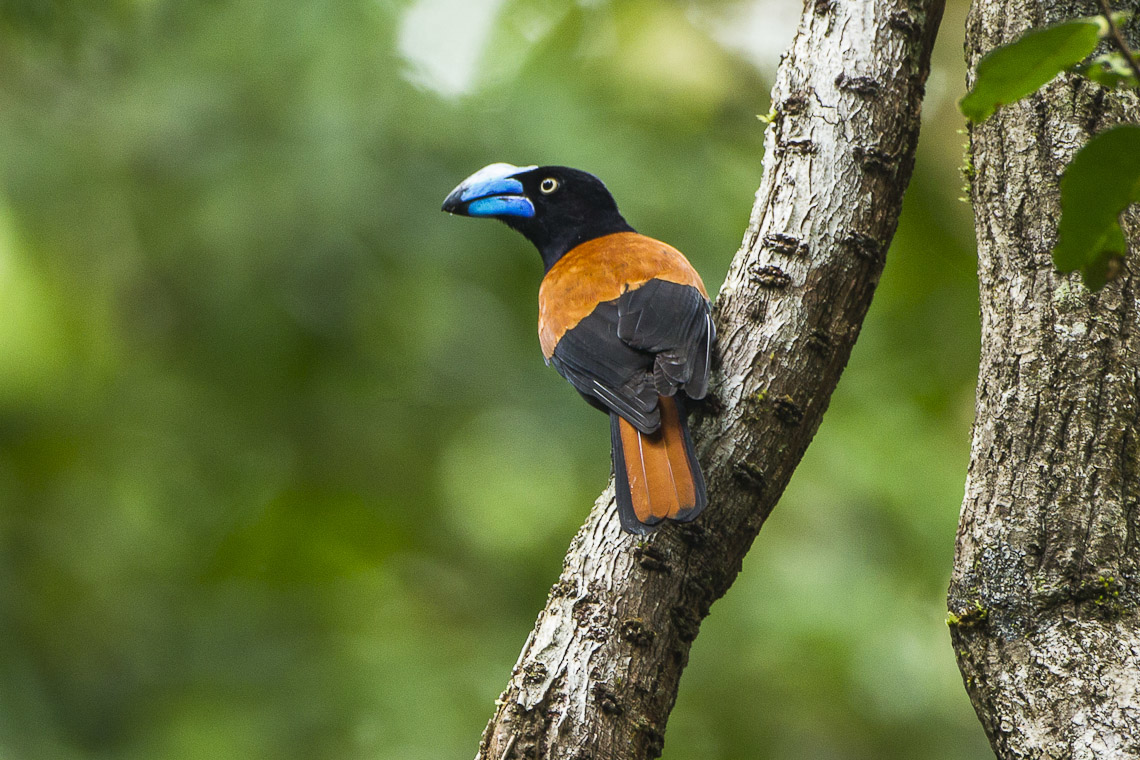

Conservation status
- Vulnerable (IUCN 3.1)

Scientific classification
- Kingdom: Animalia
- Phylum: Chordata
- Class: Aves
- Order: Passeriformes
- Family: Vangidae
- Genus: Euryceros; Lesson, 1831
- Species: E. prevostii

Binomial name
- Euryceros prevostii Lesson, 1831

= Helmet vanga =

Species of bird

The helmet vanga (Euryceros prevostii) is a distinctive-looking bird of the vanga family, Vangidae, and is classified in its own genus, Euryceros. It is mainly blue-black, with rufous wings and a huge arched blue bill. It is restricted to lowland and lower montane rainforests of northeastern Madagascar. Its diet is composed of invertebrates, predominantly insects. The species is threatened by habitat loss.

== Taxonomy ==
The helmet vanga is the only member of the genus Euryceros. Like most vangas it was originally placed in the shrike family, Laniidae. When the ornithologist Austin L. Rand moved the majority of the vangas into a separate family in 1936, he placed the helmet vanga in its own monotypic family, Eurycerotidae. It was moved to the vanga family by J. Dorst in 1960. The closest relative within the family is believed to be the rufous vanga, which is thought to have split from the helmet vanga 800,000 years ago. The specific name prevostii commemorates the French artist Florent Prévost.

== Description ==
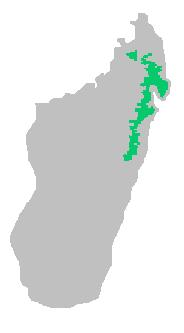
Global distribution

The helmet vanga is a large vanga, the second-largest species of vanga after the sickle-billed vanga. In length it measures 28 to 31 cm (11–12 in), and it weighs 84 to 114 g (3.0–4.0 oz). The most distinctive feature is the massive hooked bill, which is 51 mm (2.0 in) long and 30 mm (1.2 in) deep. The plumage of the head, neck, throat, breast and belly is a solid blue-black, as are the primary coverts and remiges of the wing. The mantle, the back, and the rest of the wings are rufous. The tail, which is long and broad, is black below and rufous above. The bill is bright blue with a black tip. Both sexes are alike.

== Distribution and habitat ==
It is restricted to lowland and lower montane rainforests in north-eastern Madagascar. Sites where it can be found include Marojejy National Park, Makira Natural Park, the Masoala National Park and Mantadia National Park.

== Behaviour ==
Adults mainly eat large insects, but food items brought to young in the nest may be more varied, including snails, lizards, spiders and crabs.

=== Breeding ===
Helmet vangas are monogamous and seasonal breeders. The breeding season runs from October to January on the Masoala Peninsula. Both sexes work on the construction of the nest, which is a cup shape 15 cm (5.9 in) in diameter constructed from woven plant fibres, mosses and twigs, and is placed in a fork in a tree 2 to 4 m (6.6–13.1 ft) off the ground. There is one record of courtship feeding by a male before copulation. The clutch size is two or three pinkish white eggs.

== Threats and conservation ==
The helmet vanga is considered to be threatened with extinction due to habitat loss. The species is restricted to undisturbed humid rainforest, and this habitat is increasingly being cleared for agriculture and forestry. Their population, between 6000 and 15000 mature individuals, is becoming increasingly fragmented. Ecological modelling suggests that much of their remaining habitat will be lost in 50 years due to climate change. Because of these issues the species has been listed as vulnerable by the IUCN.

== Gallery ==
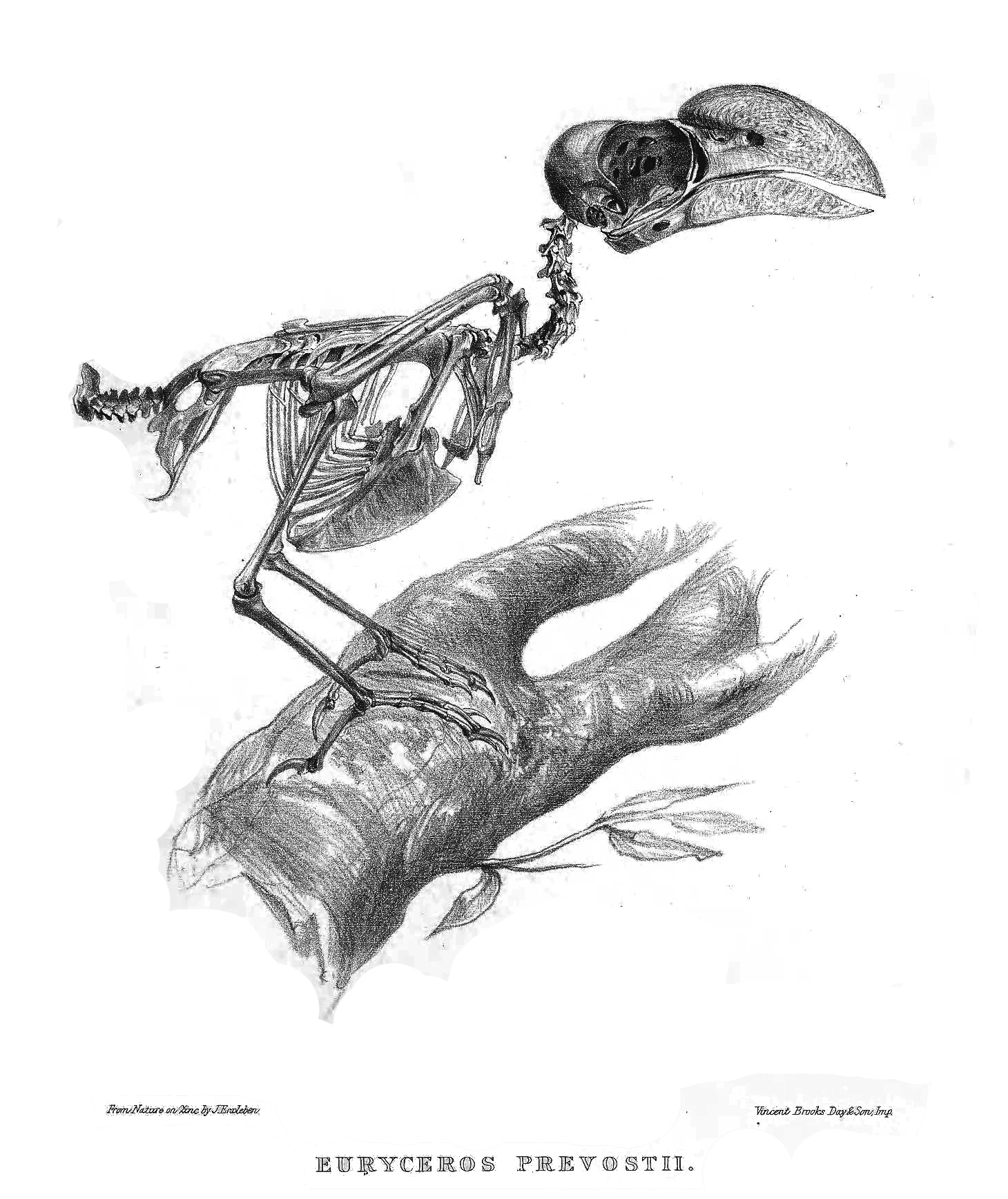
Skeleton of helmet vanga

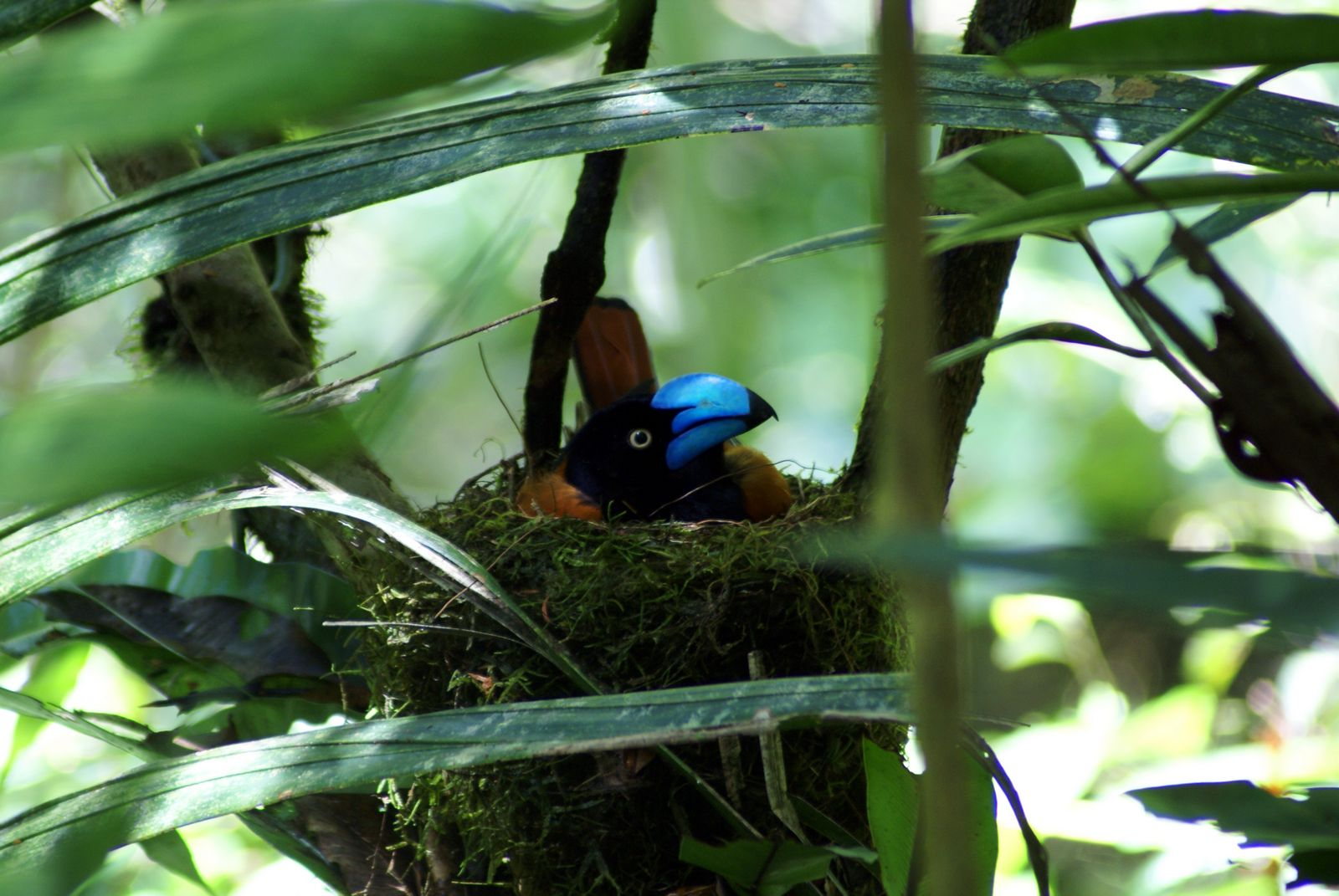
Helmet vanga on nest, showing the massive bill

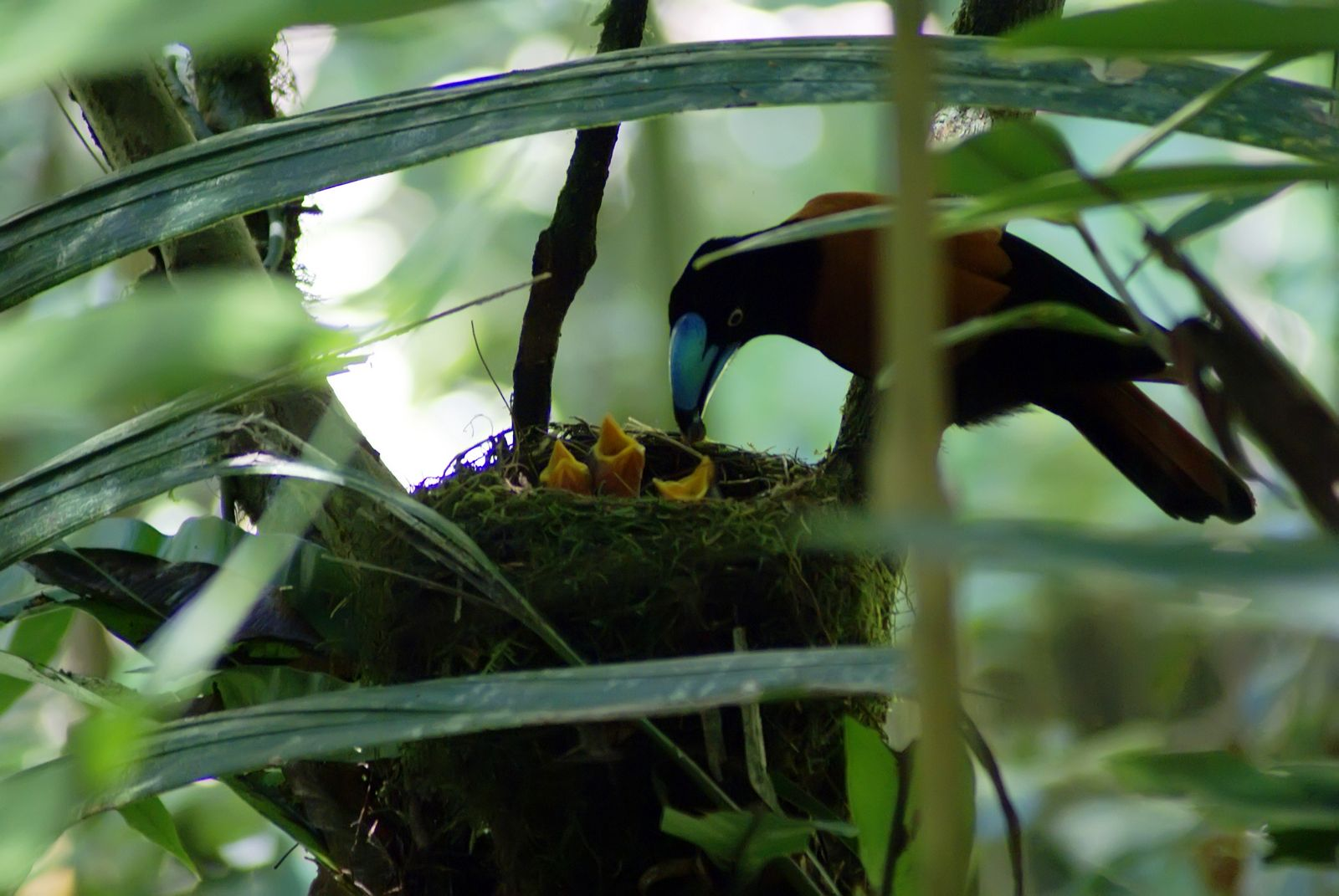
Feeding three chicks in the nest
