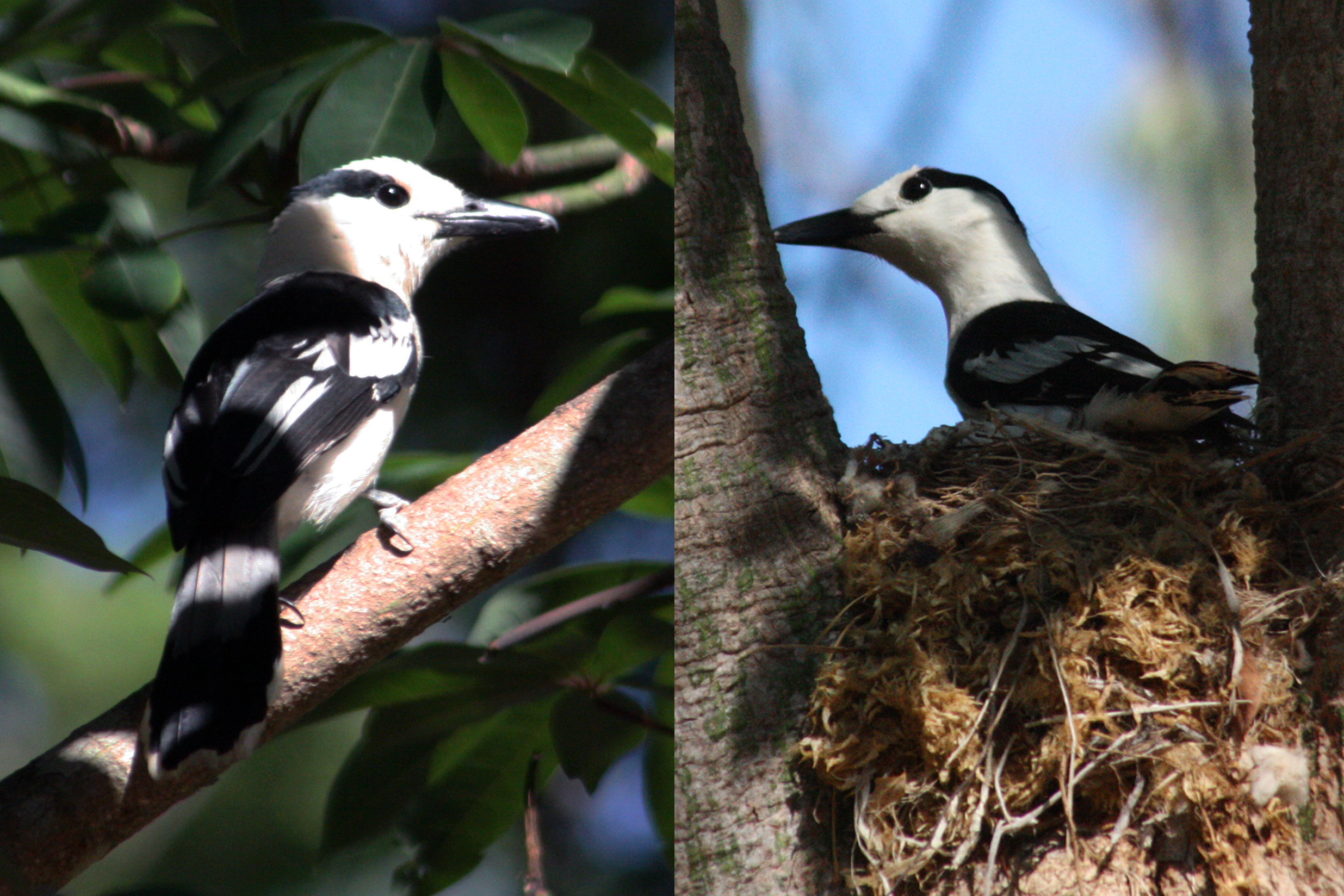
- nesting in Anjajavy Forest

Conservation status
- Least Concern (IUCN 3.1)

Scientific classification
- Kingdom: Animalia
- Phylum: Chordata
- Class: Aves
- Order: Passeriformes
- Family: Vangidae
- Genus: Vanga; Vieillot, 1816
- Species: V. curvirostris

Binomial name
- Vanga curvirostris (Linnaeus, 1766)

Synonyms
- Lanius curvirostris Linnaeus, 1766

= Hook-billed vanga =

Species of bird

The hook-billed vanga (Vanga curvirostris) is a species of bird in the family Vangidae. It is endemic to Madagascar. Its natural habitats are subtropical or tropical dry forest, subtropical or tropical moist lowland forest, and subtropical or tropical moist montane forest.

In 1760 the French zoologist Mathurin Jacques Brisson included a description of the hook-billed vanga in his Ornithologie based on a specimen collected on the island of Madagascar. He used the French name L'écorcheur de Madagascar and the Latin Collurio Madagascariensis. Although Brisson coined Latin names, these do not conform to the binomial system and are not recognised by the International Commission on Zoological Nomenclature. When in 1766 the Swedish naturalist Carl Linnaeus updated his Systema Naturae for the twelfth edition, he added 240 species that had been previously described by Brisson. One of these was the hook-billed vanga. Linnaeus included a brief description, coined the binomial name Lanius curvirostris and cited Brisson's work. It is now the only species placed in the genus Vanga that was introduced by the French ornithologist Louis Pierre Vieillot in 1816.

The genus name Vanga is the Malagasy name for the species. The specific epithet curvirostris is from Latin curvus "curved" and -rostrum "billed".

Two subspecies are recognised:

- V. c. curvirostris (Linnaeus, 1766) – west, north, east Madagascar
- V. c. cetera Bangs, 1928 – south Madagascar

A 2018 study on avian skull evolution has concluded that the ancestral neornithe had a beak most similar to this species. This suggests a similar ancestral ecological niche for modern birds.
