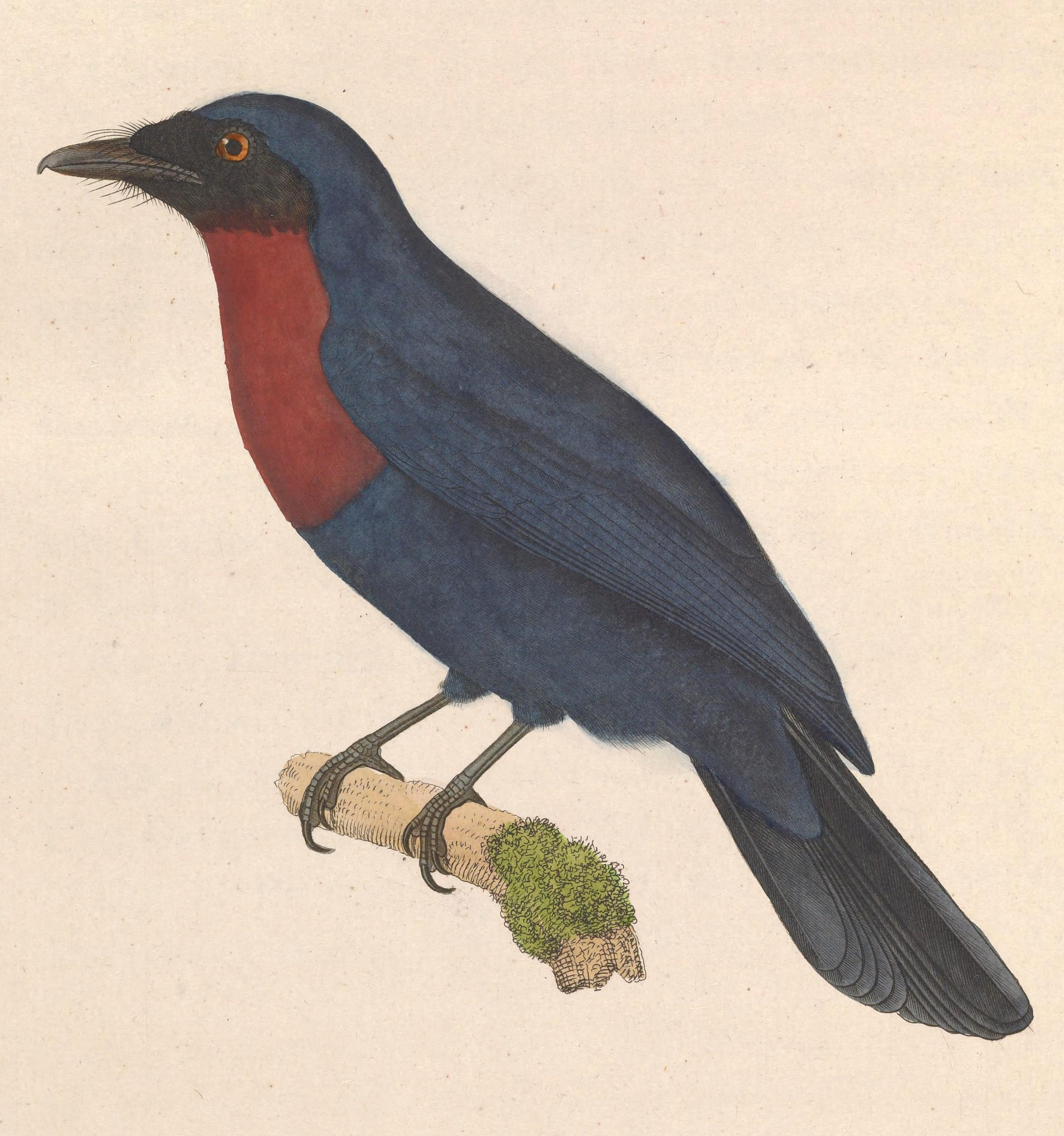

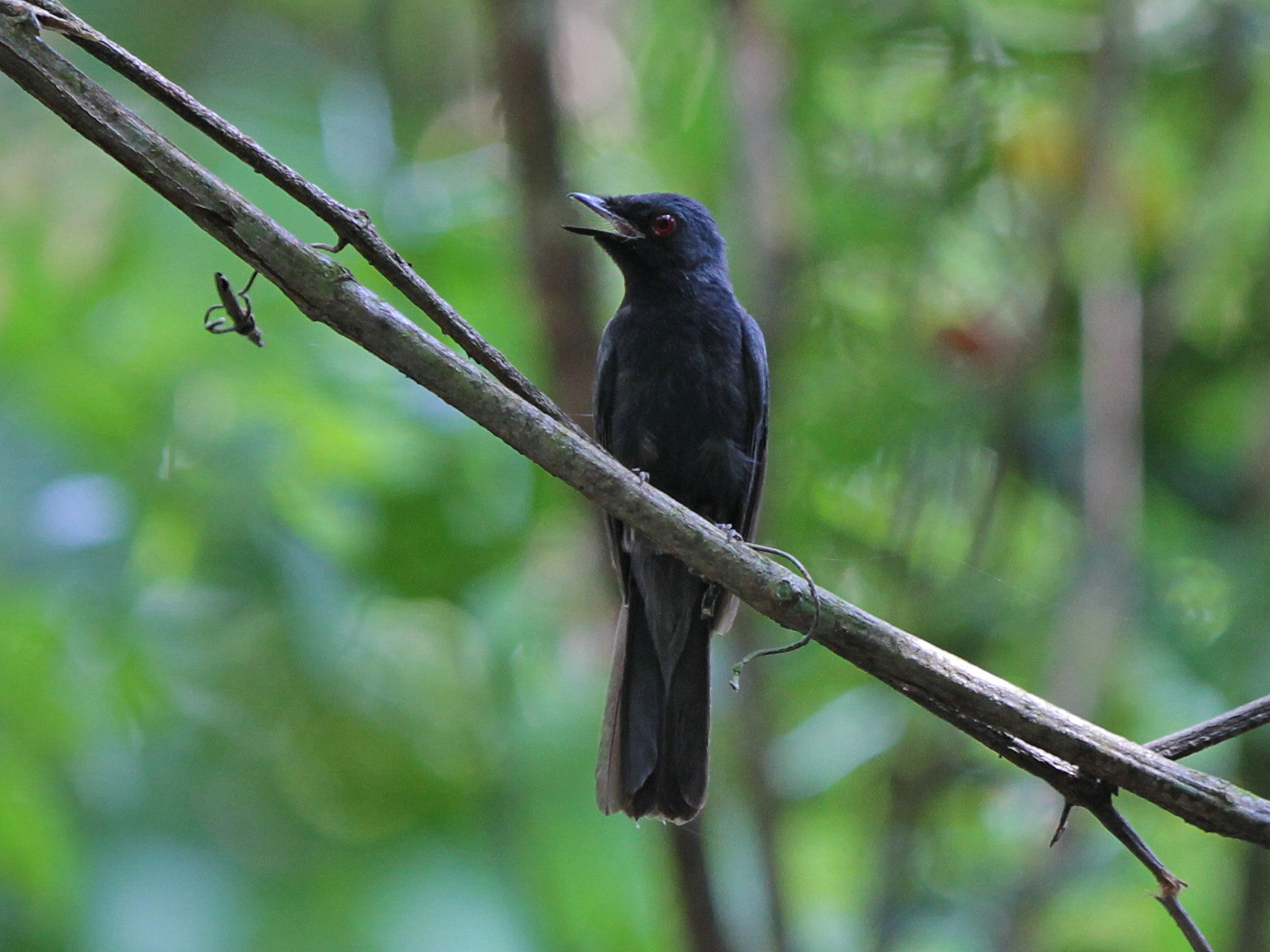

Conservation status
- Near Threatened (IUCN 3.1)

Scientific classification
- Kingdom: Animalia
- Phylum: Chordata
- Class: Aves
- Order: Passeriformes
- Family: Vangidae
- Genus: Philentoma
- Species: P. velata

Binomial name
- Philentoma velata (Temminck, 1825)

= Maroon-breasted philentoma =

Species of bird

The maroon-breasted philentoma (Philentoma velata) is a bird species. They are now usually assigned to the Vangidae. It is found in Brunei, Indonesia, Malaysia, Myanmar, Singapore, and Thailand. Its natural habitats are subtropical or tropical moist lowland forests and subtropical or tropical swamps.

It is threatened by habitat loss.

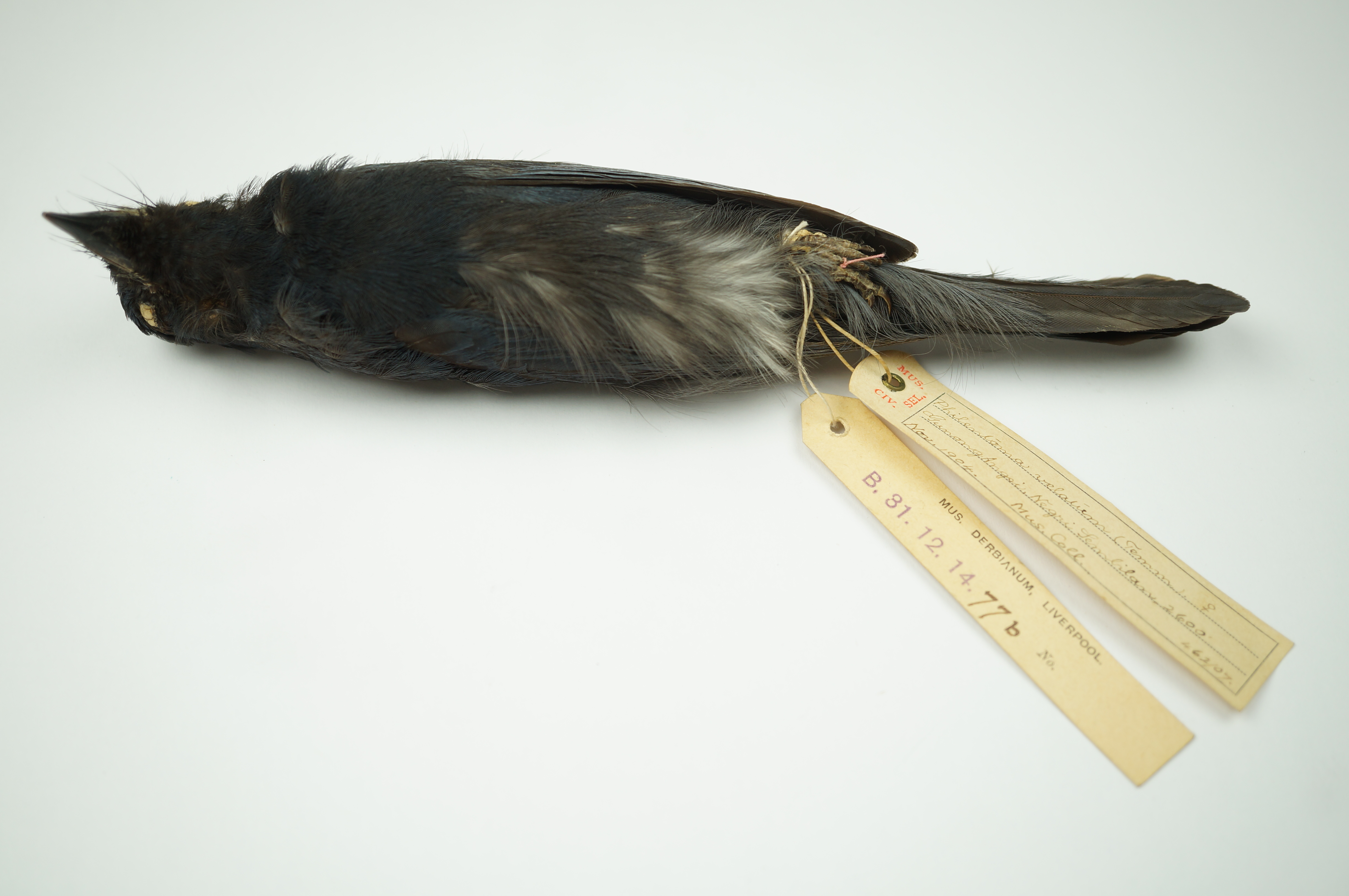
Maroon-breasted Philentoma in the collections of World Museum.
