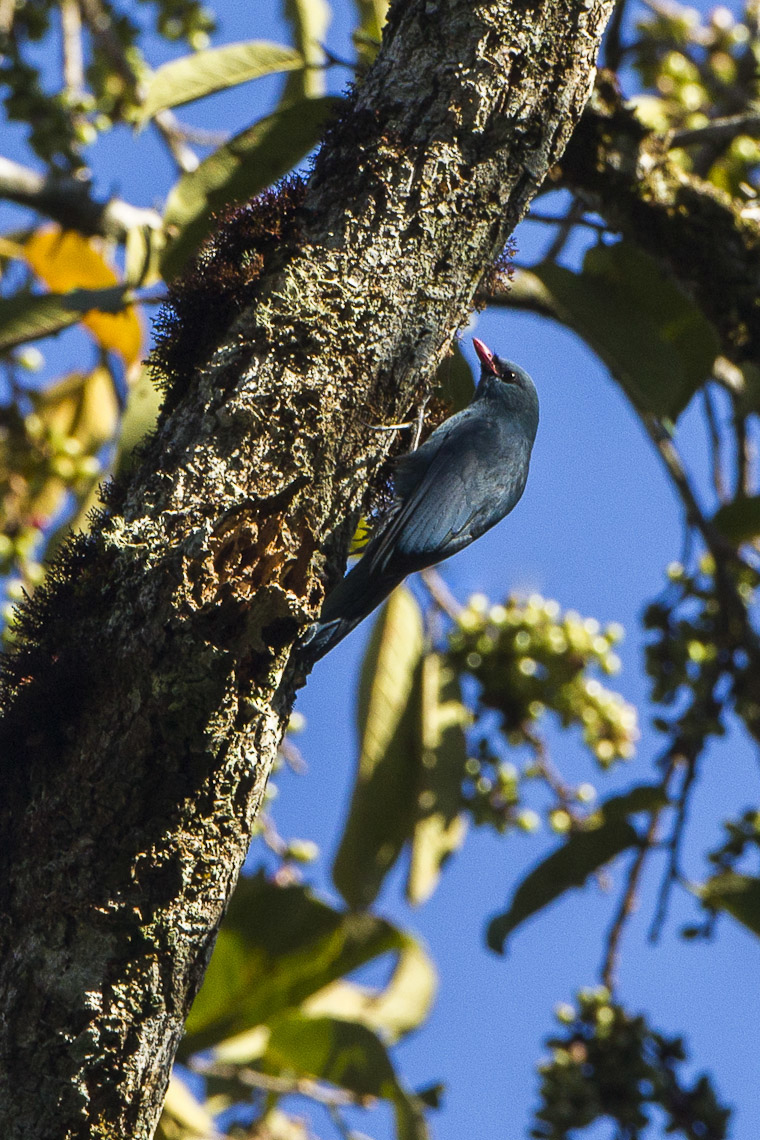

Conservation status
- Least Concern (IUCN 3.1)

Scientific classification
- Kingdom: Animalia
- Phylum: Chordata
- Class: Aves
- Order: Passeriformes
- Family: Vangidae
- Genus: Hypositta; A. Newton, 1881
- Species: H. corallirostris

Binomial name
- Hypositta corallirostris (Newton, A, 1863)

= Nuthatch vanga =

Species of bird

The nuthatch vanga (Hypositta corallirostris), also known as the coral-billed nuthatch-vanga and formerly as the coral-billed nuthatch, is a species of bird in the family Vangidae. It is endemic to Madagascar.

Its natural habitat is subtropical or tropical moist lowland forests.
