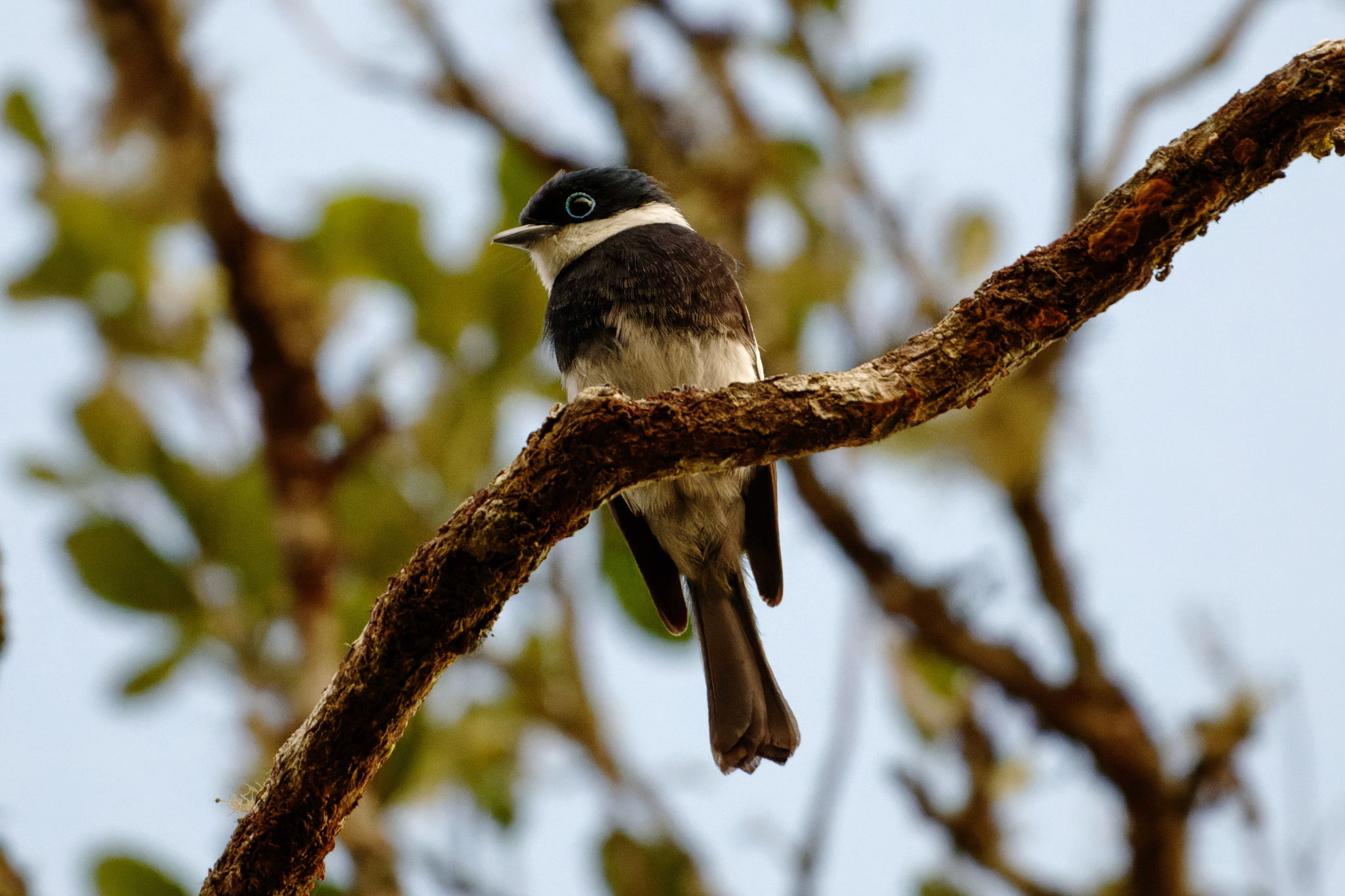

Conservation status
- Least Concern (IUCN 3.1)

Scientific classification
- Kingdom: Animalia
- Phylum: Chordata
- Class: Aves
- Order: Passeriformes
- Family: Vangidae
- Genus: Pseudobias; Sharpe, 1870
- Species: P. wardi

Binomial name
- Pseudobias wardi Sharpe, 1870

= Ward's vanga =

Ward's flycatcher

Species of bird

Ward's vanga (Pseudobias wardi), also known as Ward's flycatcher, is a species of bird in the family Vangidae. It is the only species placed in the genus Pseudobias. It is endemic to Madagascar. Its natural habitat is subtropical or tropical moist lowland forests.

Its common name and Latin binomial commemorate the English naturalist Christopher Ward, who collected the type specimen of the bird.
