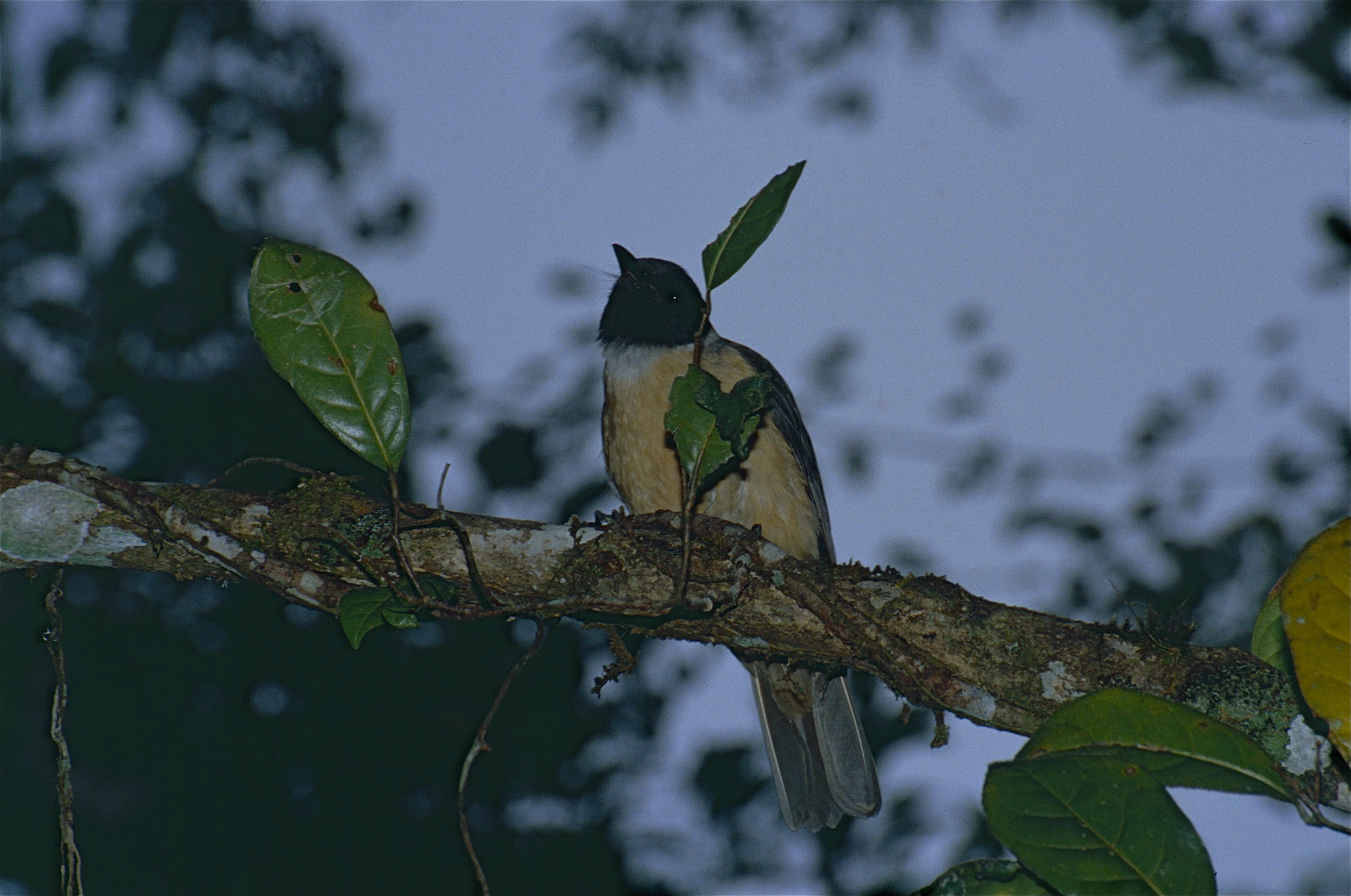

Conservation status
- Least Concern (IUCN 3.1)

Scientific classification
- Kingdom: Animalia
- Phylum: Chordata
- Class: Aves
- Order: Passeriformes
- Family: Vangidae
- Genus: Tylas; Hartlaub, 1862
- Species: T. eduardi

Binomial name
- Tylas eduardi Hartlaub, 1862

= Tylas vanga =

Species of bird

The tylas vanga (Tylas eduardi) is a species of bird in the family Vangidae. It is monotypic within the genus Tylas. It is endemic to Madagascar. Its natural habitats are subtropical or tropical dry forest and subtropical or tropical moist lowland forest.
