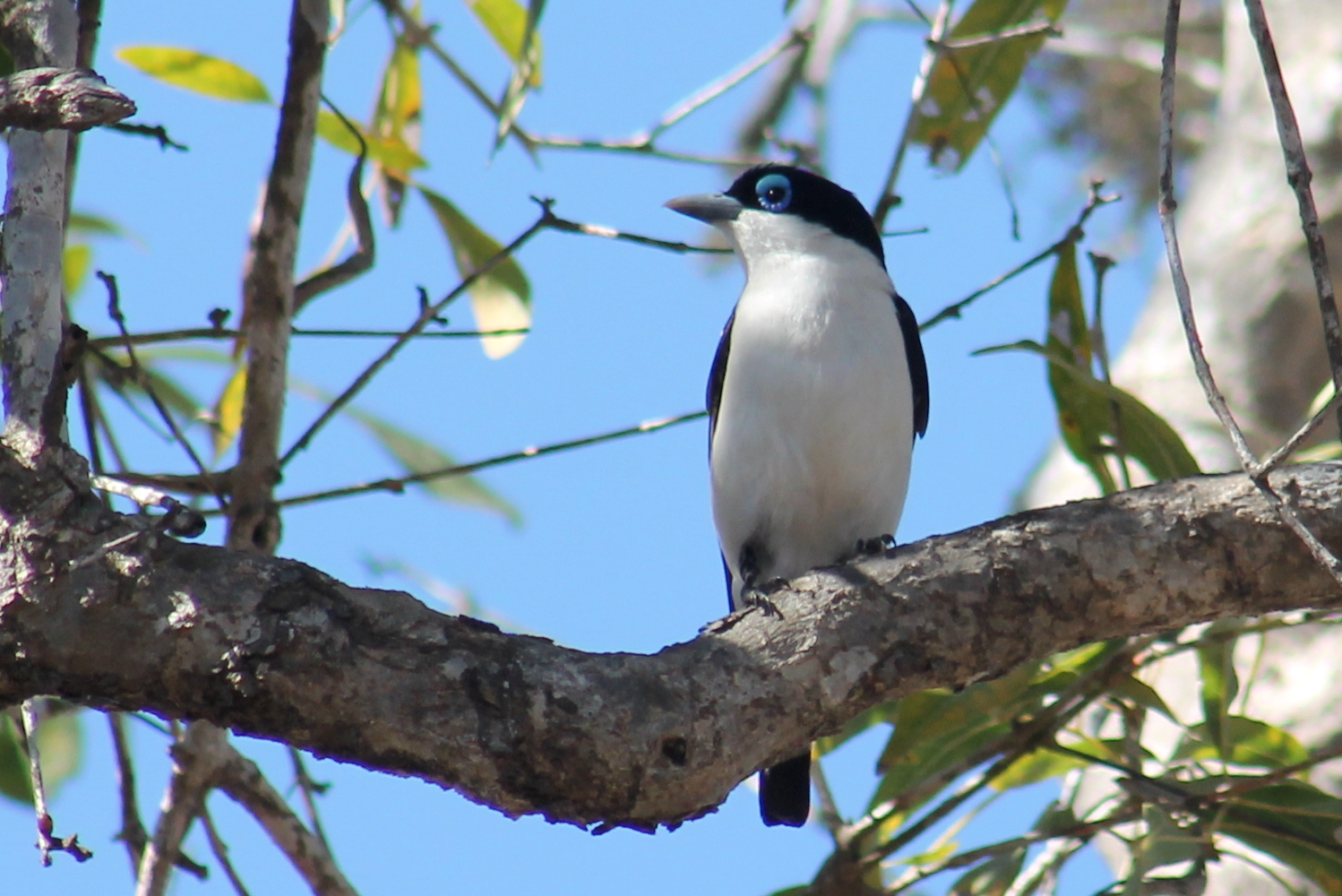

Conservation status
- Least Concern (IUCN 3.1)

Scientific classification
- Kingdom: Animalia
- Phylum: Chordata
- Class: Aves
- Order: Passeriformes
- Family: Vangidae
- Genus: Leptopterus; Bonaparte, 1854
- Species: L. chabert

Binomial name
- Leptopterus chabert (Müller, 1776)

= Chabert vanga =

Species of bird

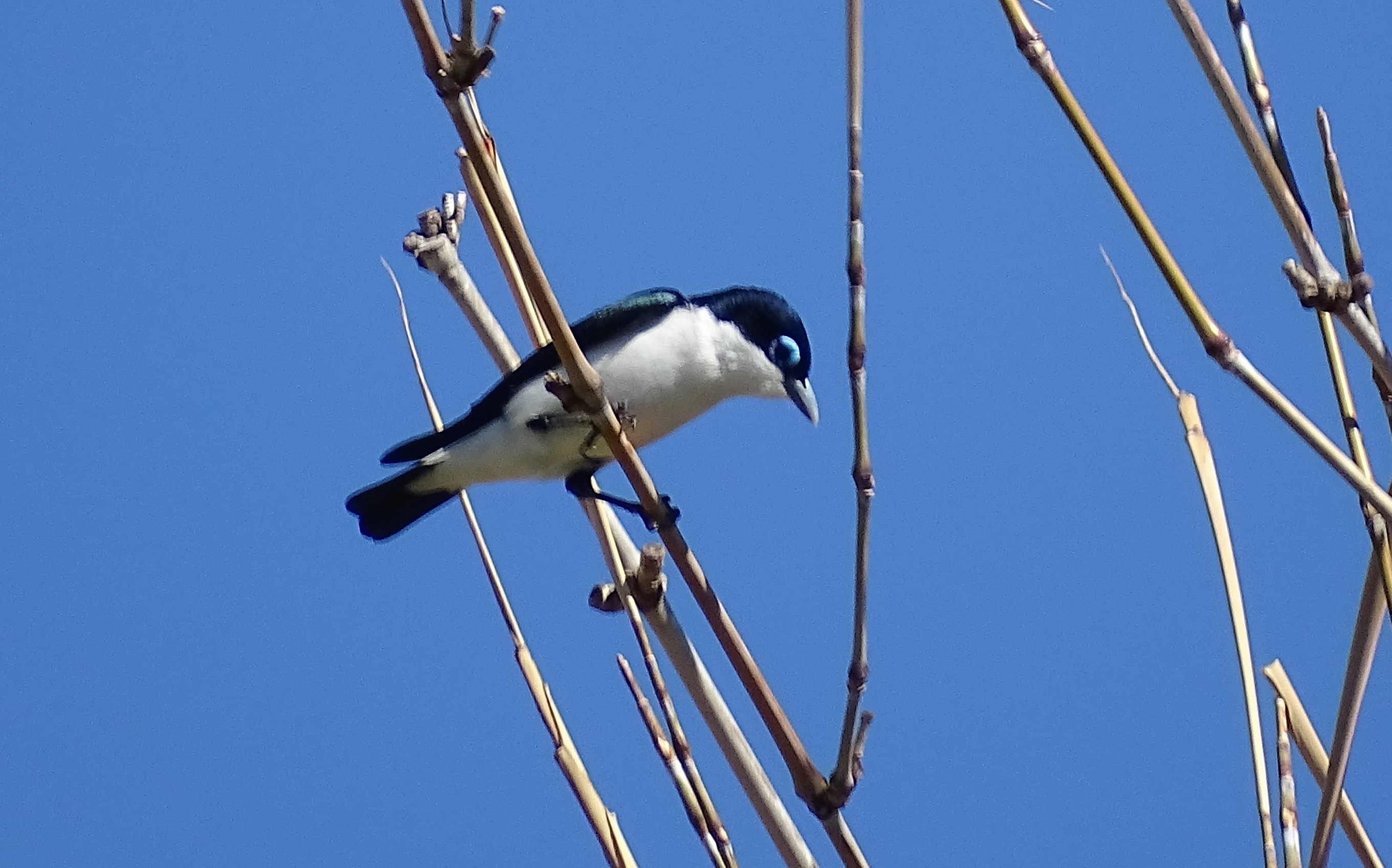
Chabert vanga near Toliara, SW Madagascar

The chabert vanga (Leptopterus chabert), also erroneously called "Chabert's vanga", is a species of bird in the family Vangidae. It is monotypic within the genus Leptopterus. The chabert vanga is the smallest bird in the vanga family when compared to the white-headed vanga and the blue vanga. Their biometrics are typically 14 centimeters in length and their weight ranges from 17 to 26.5 grams.

== Habitat ==
The chabert vanga is endemic to Madagascar. Its natural habitats are subtropical or tropical dry forest, subtropical or tropical moist lowland forest, and subtropical or tropical moist montane forest. They tend to reside on sea level and up to 1000m. Very occasionally they are found higher than 1000m above sea level.

== Vocalizations ==
The chabert vanga's name comes from a rendition of its call. Their calls tend to repeat every two to three seconds making the sound "teedee" or a "tse tse tse" when trying to communicate.

== Diet ==
They feed on insects such as; beetles, cockroaches, and worms. Also, they have been found to eat small vertebrates such as chameleons and some small berries.

== Description ==
The cabaret vanga only possess two colors, black and white. Their head and wings are a dark black. However, due to the sun, this black can often be seen as having a shiny blue tint to it. Their underparts are white like their chin and belly. The color of their tails differ from where they originate. If they are located in the southwest, the tail of the chabert vanga has a white patch at the base of the tail. If they are from anywhere else in the world, the whole entire tail of the chabert vanga is known to be black. The bill is a light blue color and their eyes also resemble a turquoise or cobalt blue. The juvenile of the cabaret vanga resembles the adult however, it lacks the blue eyes. The juveniles tend to look a shade paler due to the white streaks and white fingers on their back and wing feathers. The white streaks tend to fade as they grow older. There is little physical difference between the male and female chabert vanga.

== Subspecies ==
Leptopterus chabert chaber is found in west, north, and eastern Madagascar. Leptopterus chabert schistocercus is found in southwest Madagascar.

== Status ==
Chabert vangas are not currently globally threatened. They are fairly common throughout their range in the Madagascar and surrounding areas. They are less common in more humid areas and dense forests. The chabert vanga is most commonly spotted at the edge of forests and dense tree populations. They are constantly moving and migrating. They are typically found in flocks rather than individually seen.
