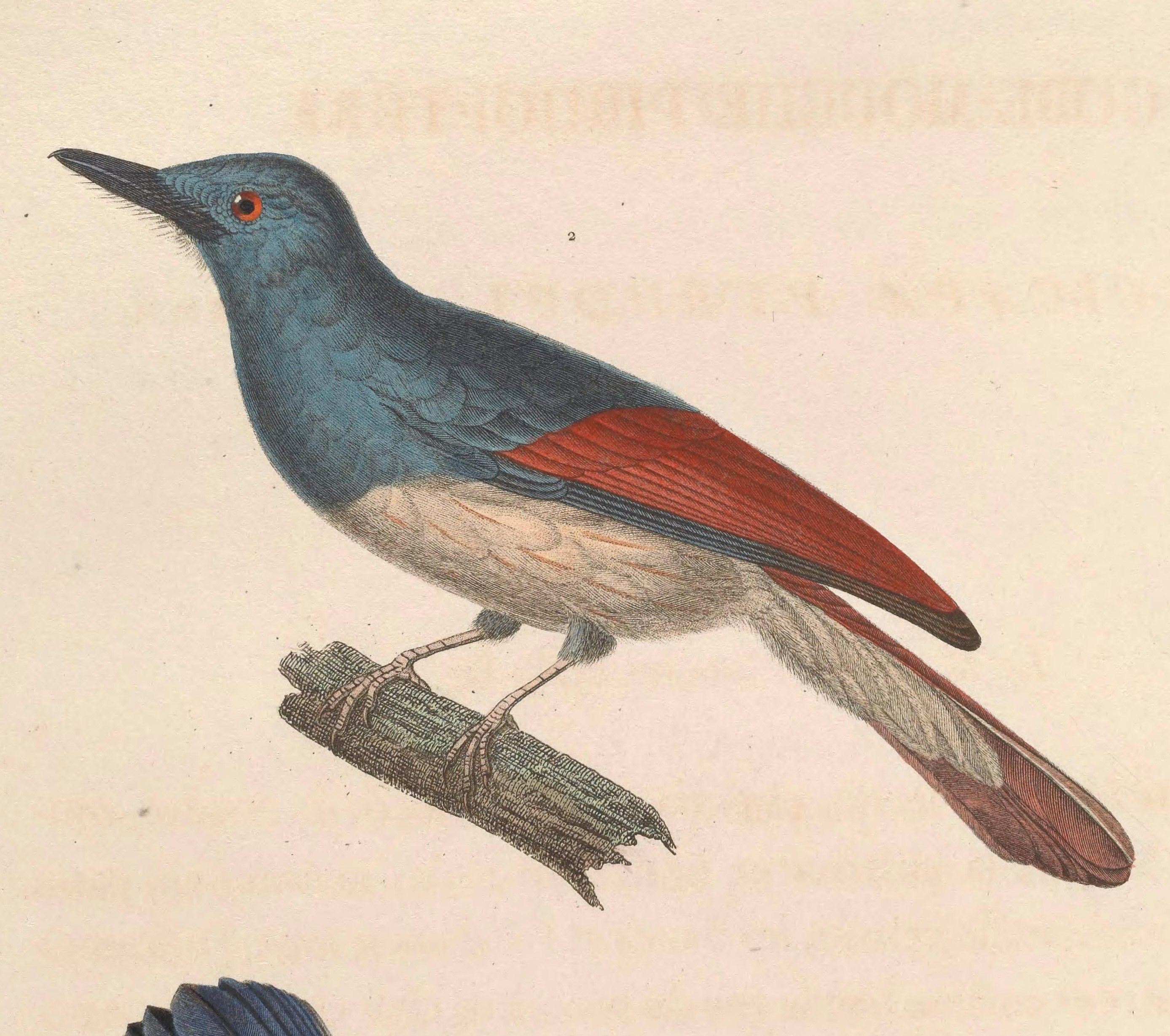

Conservation status
- Least Concern (IUCN 3.1)

Scientific classification
- Kingdom: Animalia
- Phylum: Chordata
- Class: Aves
- Order: Passeriformes
- Family: Vangidae
- Genus: Philentoma
- Species: P. pyrhoptera

Binomial name
- Philentoma pyrhoptera (Temminck, 1836)

= Rufous-winged philentoma =

Species of bird

The rufous-winged philentoma (Philentoma pyrhoptera) is a bird species. They are now usually assigned to the Vangidae. It is found in Brunei, Indonesia, Malaysia, Myanmar, Thailand, and Vietnam. Its natural habitat is subtropical or tropical moist lowland forests.

== Diet ==
It is an insectivore.

== Gallery ==
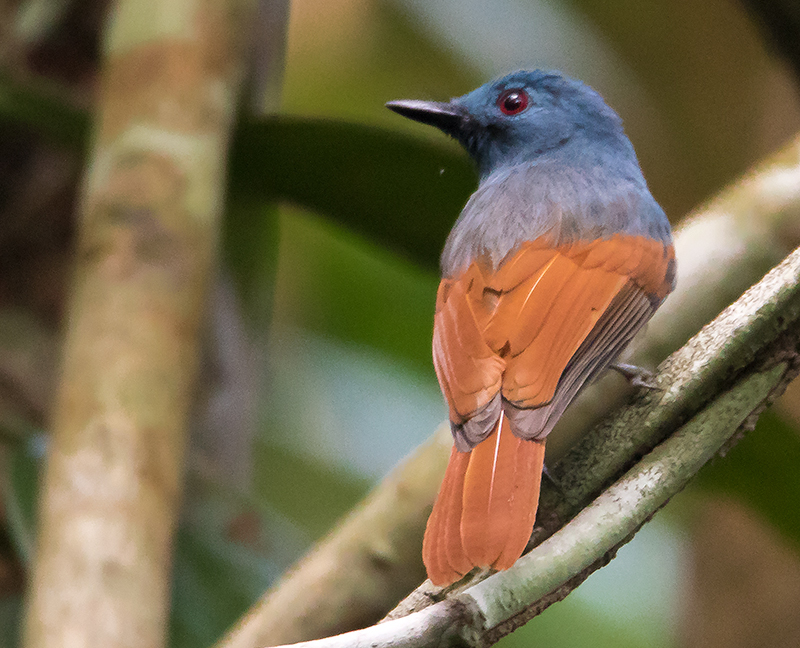
At Krau Forest Reserve, Malaysia
