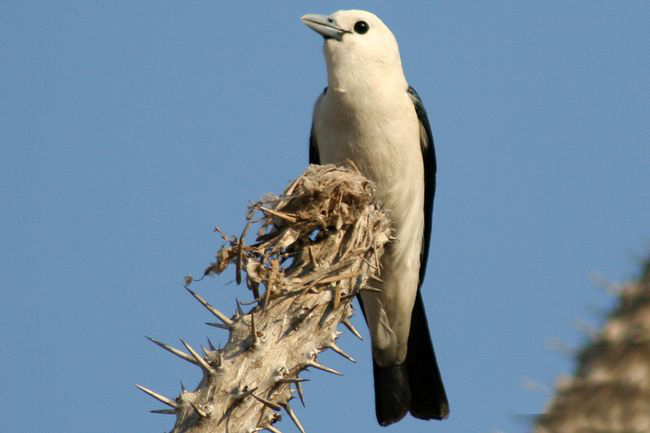

Conservation status
- Least Concern (IUCN 3.1)

Scientific classification
- Kingdom: Animalia
- Phylum: Chordata
- Class: Aves
- Order: Passeriformes
- Family: Vangidae
- Genus: Artamella; W.L. Sclater, 1924
- Species: A. viridis

Binomial name
- Artamella viridis (Müller, 1776)

Synonyms
- Leptopteryx viridis

= White-headed vanga =

Species of bird

The white-headed vanga (Artamella viridis) is a species of bird in the family Vangidae. It is monotypic within the genus Artamella. It is endemic to Madagascar, where its natural habitats are subtropical or tropical dry forest, subtropical or tropical moist lowland forest, and subtropical or tropical moist montane forest.

== Taxonomy and systematics ==
=== Former Species ===
Formerly, some authorities also considered the black-and-crimson oriole to be a species within the genus Artamella.
