= Knud Paludan =

Danish zoologist

Knud John Paludan (2 November 1908 – 11 September 1988) was a Danish zoologist. He participated in Danish expedition into Iran and Afghanistan and conducted museum as a curator and conducted field studies on seabirds and pheasants.

Paludan was born in Svanninge to Else Marie Rasmussen (1877-1950) and Otto Edvard Paludan (1879-1952). He was sent to the Herlufsholm boarding school and then a received a master's degree in zoology in 1933. He travelled to Iran on an ornithological expedition in 1935. Finding that there was no work, he studied medicine and became a doctor at Christiansø in 1941. He also began to study birds and in 1947-49, he took part in the Danish Henning Haslund-Christensen expedition into Afghanistan as ornithologist and physician. He received a PhD for his studies on Silver and Herring gulls in 1951, after which he worked at the Wildlife Biological Station, Kalø and from 1962 he worked at the Forestry Museum, Hørsholm. In 1936 he examined the collections made from the Niger by Ole Olufsen (1865-1929). Paludan wrote a monograph on the auk and examined the biology of seabirds.
