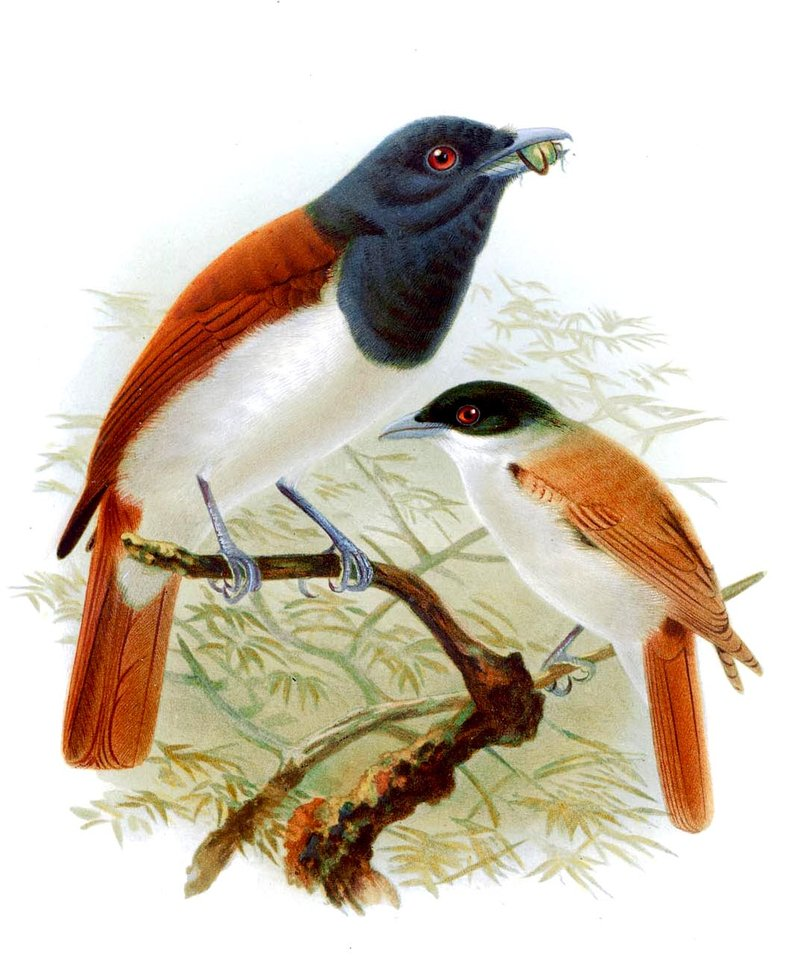

Conservation status
- Least Concern (IUCN 3.1)

Scientific classification
- Kingdom: Animalia
- Phylum: Chordata
- Class: Aves
- Order: Passeriformes
- Family: Vangidae
- Genus: Schetba; Lesson, 1831
- Species: S. rufa

Binomial name
- Schetba rufa (Linnaeus, 1766)

Synonyms
- Lanius rufus Linnaeus, 1766

= Rufous vanga =

Species of bird

The rufous vanga (Schetba rufa) is a species of bird in the family Vangidae. It is monotypic within the genus Schetba. It is endemic to Madagascar, where its natural habitats are subtropical or tropical dry forest and subtropical or tropical moist lowland forest.

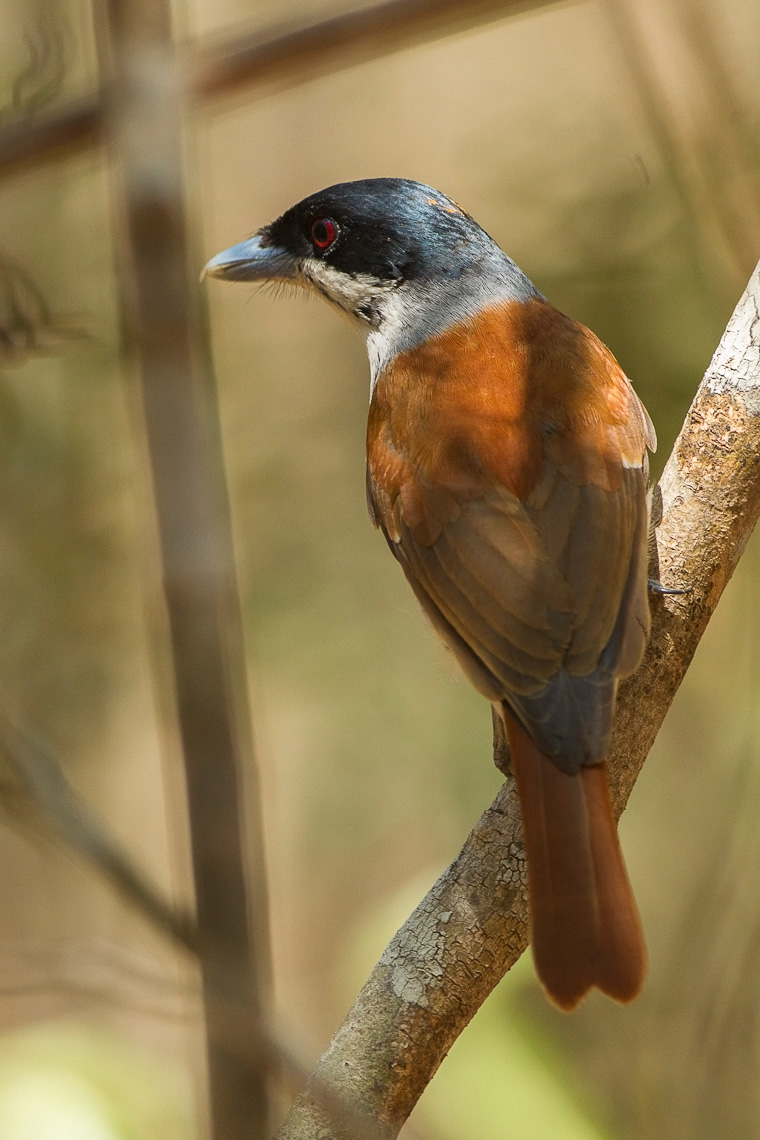
Female

In 1760 the French zoologist Mathurin Jacques Brisson included a description of the rufous vanga in his Ornithologie based on a specimen collected on the island of Madagascar. He used the French name La pie-griesche rousse de Madagascar and the Latin Lanius Madagascariensis rufus. Although Brisson coined Latin names, these do not conform to the binomial system and are not recognised by the International Commission on Zoological Nomenclature. When in 1766 the Swedish naturalist Carl Linnaeus updated his Systema Naturae for the twelfth edition, he added 240 species that had been previously described by Brisson. One of these was the rufous vanga. Linnaeus included a brief description, coined the binomial name Lanius rufus and cited Brisson's work. The rufous vanga is now the only species placed in the genus Schetba that was introduced by the French naturalist René Lesson in 1831.

Two subspecies are recognised:

- S. r. rufa (Linnaeus, 1766) – north and east Madagascar
- S. r. occidentalis Delacour, 1931 – west Madagascar
