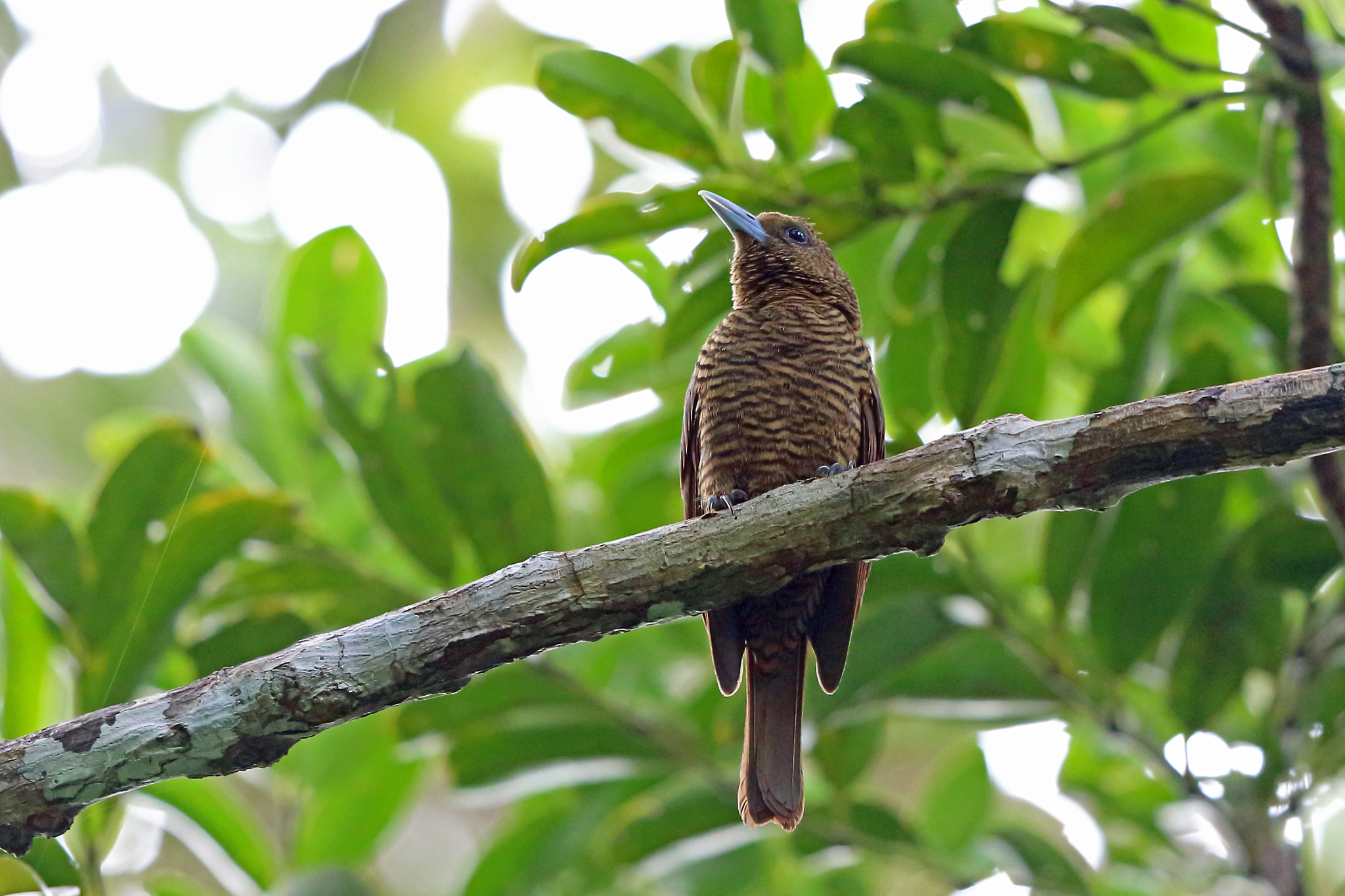
- female bird

Conservation status
- Endangered (IUCN 3.1)

Scientific classification
- Kingdom: Animalia
- Phylum: Chordata
- Class: Aves
- Order: Passeriformes
- Family: Vangidae
- Genus: Oriolia; I. Geoffroy Saint-Hilaire, 1838
- Species: O. bernieri

Binomial name
- Oriolia bernieri I. Geoffroy Saint-Hilaire, 1838

= Bernier's vanga =

Species of bird

Bernier's vanga (Oriolia bernieri) is a bird species in the family Vangidae. It is in the monotypic genus Oriolia. It is endemic to Madagascar. Its natural habitat is subtropical or tropical moist lowland forests. It is threatened by habitat loss.
