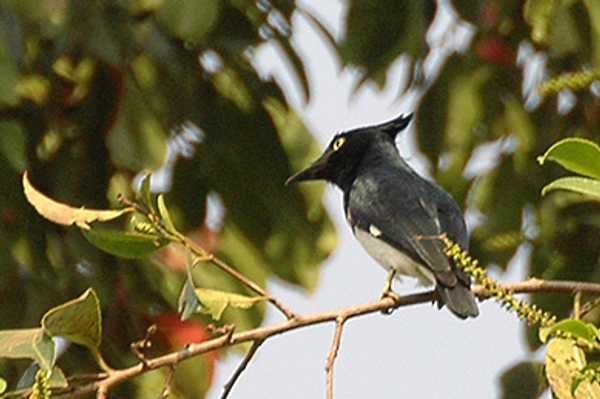

Conservation status
- Least Concern (IUCN 3.1)

Scientific classification
- Kingdom: Animalia
- Phylum: Chordata
- Class: Aves
- Order: Passeriformes
- Family: Vangidae
- Genus: Bias; Lesson, 1831
- Species: B. musicus

Binomial name
- Bias musicus (Vieillot, 1818)

= Black-and-white shrike-flycatcher =

Species of bird

The black-and-white shrike-flycatcher (Bias musicus), also known as the black-and-white flycatcher or vanga flycatcher, is a species of passerine bird found in Africa. It was placed with the wattle-eyes and batises in the family Platysteiridae but is now considered to be more closely related to the helmetshrikes and woodshrikes.

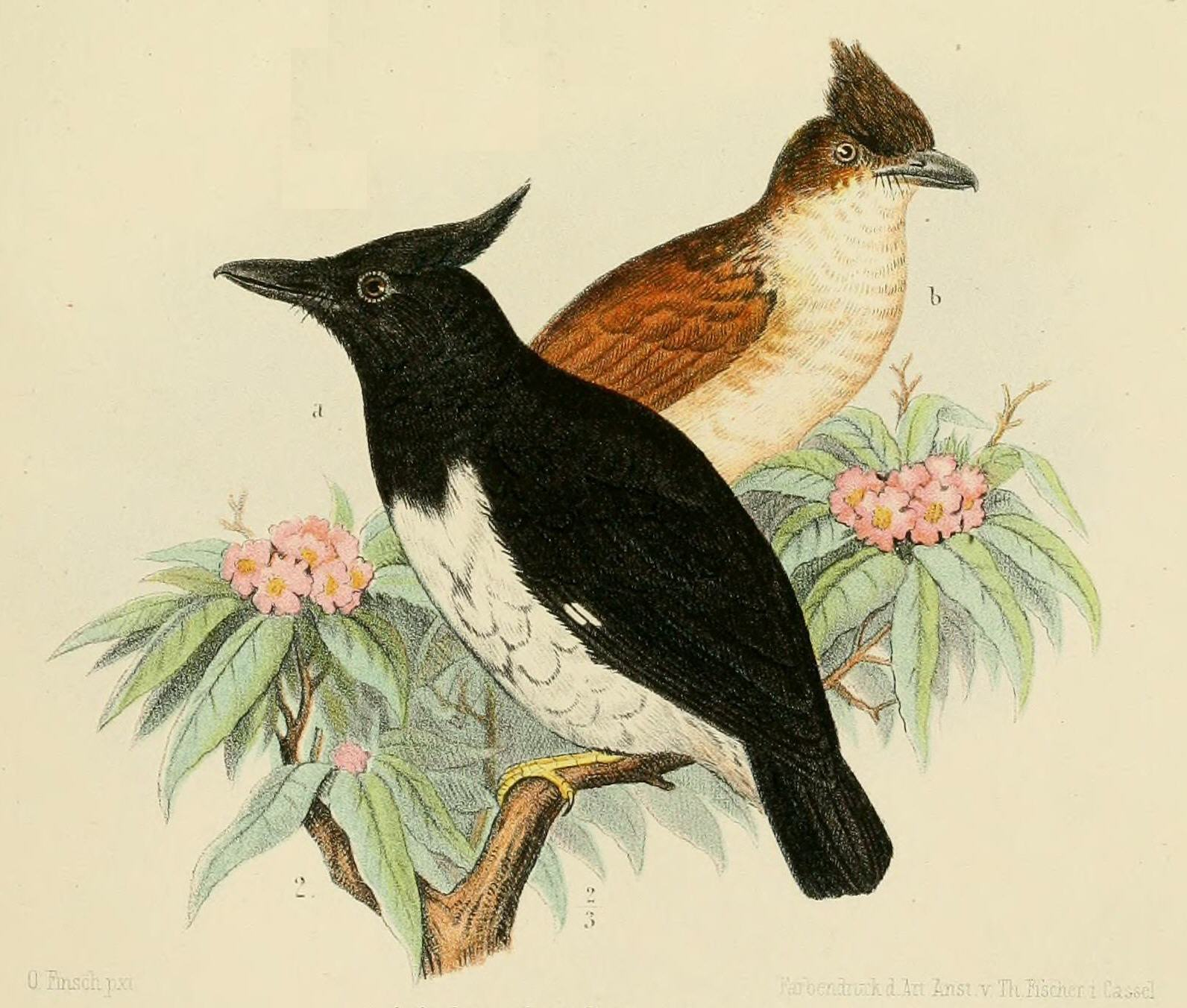
Illustration by Otto Finsch

It is found in Angola, Benin, Cameroon, Central African Republic, Republic of the Congo, Democratic Republic of the Congo, Ivory Coast, Equatorial Guinea, Gabon, Gambia, Ghana, Guinea, Guinea-Bissau, Kenya, Liberia, Malawi, Mozambique, Nigeria, Sierra Leone, South Sudan, Tanzania, Togo, Uganda, and Zimbabwe. Its natural habitats are subtropical or tropical dry forest, subtropical or tropical moist lowland forest, and subtropical or tropical moist montane forest.
