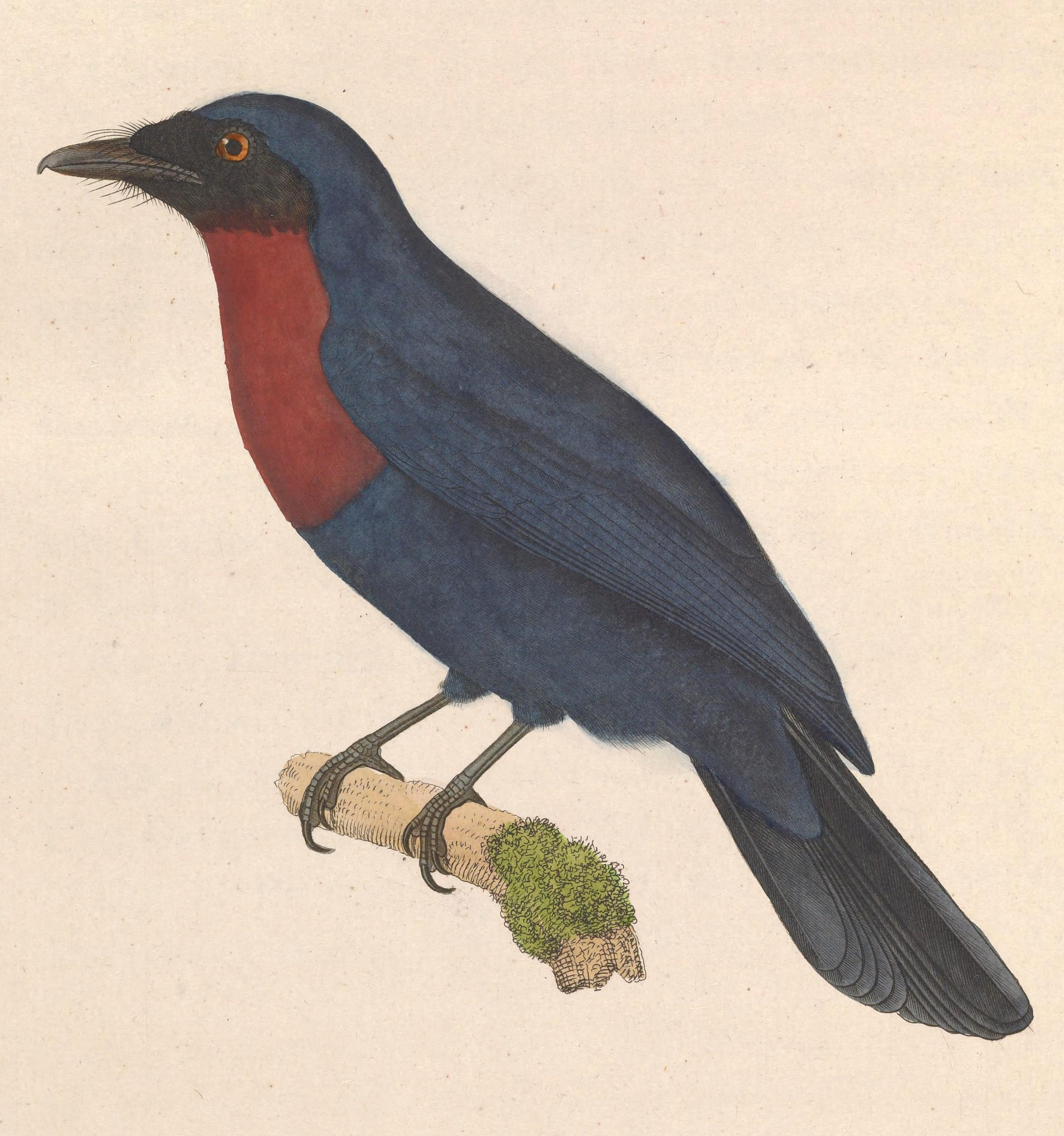
- Maroon-breasted philentoma (Philentoma velata)

Scientific classification
- Kingdom: Animalia
- Phylum: Chordata
- Class: Aves
- Order: Passeriformes
- Family: Vangidae
- Genus: Philentoma; Eyton, 1845

Type species
- Philentoma castaneum Eyton, 1845

= Philentoma =

Genus of birds

Philentoma is an enigmatic genus of birds. They are now usually included in the Vangidae.

== Species ==
There are two species:

Image	Scientific name	Common name	Distribution
	Philentoma pyrhoptera	Rufous-winged philentoma	Brunei, Indonesia, Malaysia, Myanmar, Thailand, and Vietnam
	Philentoma velata	Maroon-breasted philentoma	Brunei, Indonesia, Malaysia, Myanmar, Singapore, and Thailand.
