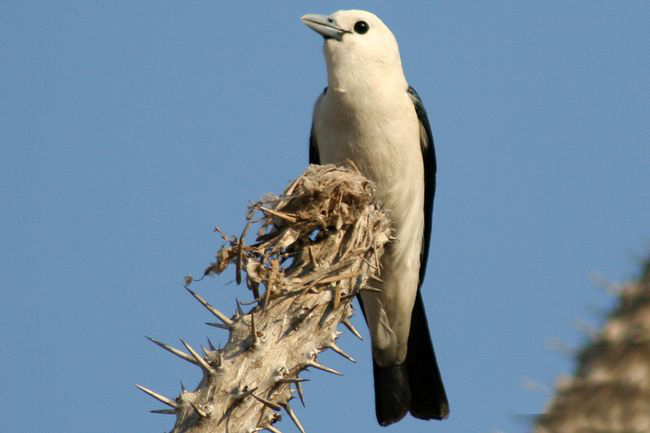
- White-headed vanga (Artamella viridis)

Scientific classification
- Kingdom: Animalia
- Phylum: Chordata
- Class: Aves
- Order: Passeriformes
- Superfamily: Malaconotoidea
- Family: Vangidae; Swainson, 1831

Genera
- 21, see text

Synonyms
- Tephrodornithidae

= Vanga =

Vangidae

Family of birds

The family Vangidae (from vanga, Malagasy for the hook-billed vanga, Vanga curvirostris) comprises a group of often shrike-like medium-sized birds distributed from Asia to Africa, including the vangas of Madagascar to which the family owes its name. Many species in this family were previously classified elsewhere in other families. Recent molecular techniques made it possible to assign these species to Vangidae, thereby solving several taxonomic enigmas. The family contains 40 species divided into 21 genera.

== Taxonomy ==
In addition to the small set of Malagasy species traditionally called the vangas, Vangidae includes some Asian groups: the woodshrikes (Tephrodornis), flycatcher-shrikes (Hemipus) and philentomas.

Vangidae belongs to a clade of corvid birds that also includes bushshrikes (Malaconotidae), ioras (Aegithinidae) and the Australian butcherbirds, magpies and currawongs (Cracticidae) and woodswallows (Artamidae), which has been defined as the superfamily Malaconotoidea. They seem closely related to some enigmatic African groups: the helmetshrikes (Prionops) and the shrike-flycatchers (Bias and Megabyas).

On Madagascar, vangas were traditionally believed to be a small family of shrike-like birds. Recent research suggests that several Madagascan taxa most similar in appearance and habits (and formerly considered to be) Old World warblers, Old World flycatchers or Old World babblers may be vangas. Satoshi Yamagishi and collaborators found in 2001 that Newtonia appeared to belong with the vangas rather than the warblers and also that Tylas was a vanga and not a bulbul. It also appears that Ward's vanga and Crossley's vanga belong with the vangas.

The phylogenetic relationships between the genera are shown below. The cladogram is based on a study by Sushma Reddy and collaborators that was published in 2012. The species in the subfamily Vanginae are endemic to Madagascar.

- Vangidae
  - - Prionops – helmetshrikes (8 species)
    - - Megabyas – African shrike-flycatcher
      - - Bias – black-and-white shrike-flycatcher
        - - Hemipus – flycatcher-shrikes (2 species)
          - Tephrodornis – woodshrikes (4 species)
  - - Philentoma – philentomas (2 species)
    - Vanginae
      - Newtonia – newtonias (4 species)
      - - - Tylas – tylas vanga
          - Calicalicus – vangas (2 species)
        - - Hypositta – nuthatch vanga
          - - - Mystacornis – Crossley's vanga
              - - Leptopterus – Chabert vanga
                - Cyanolanius – blue vangas (2 species)
            - - - Vanga – hook-billed vanga
                - - Pseudobias – Ward's vanga
                  - - Schetba – rufous vanga
                    - Euryceros – helmet vanga
              - - Xenopirostris – vangas (3 species)
                - - Oriolia – Bernier's vanga
                  - - Falculea – sickle-billed vanga
                    - Artamella – white-headed vanga

== Description ==
The vangas are an example of adaptive radiation, having evolved from a single founding population into a variety of forms adapted to various niches occupied by other bird families in other parts of the world. They differ in size, colour and bill shape but are similar in skull shape and bony palate structure. They are small to medium-sized birds, varying from 12 to 32 cm in length. Many have strong, hooked bills similar to those of shrikes. The helmet vanga has a particularly large bill with a casque on top. Other species, such as the newtonias, have a small, thin bill. The sickle-billed vanga is notable for its long, curved bill used to probe into holes and cracks.

Most vangas are largely black, brown or grey above and white below. Exceptions include the blue and white blue vanga and the blue-grey nuthatch vanga. The helmet vanga is mostly black with a rufous back. Male Bernier's vangas are entirely black while the females are brown. It is one of several species with distinct male and female plumage while in other species the sexes are identical.

Most vangas have whistling calls.

== Distribution and habitat ==
They are native to Sub-Saharan Africa and the Indomalayan realm, although most are endemic to Madagascar in a variety of forest and scrub habitats. Several species including Van Dam's vanga and sickle-billed vanga can be found in the dry deciduous forests in the west of the island. Some such as Crossley's vanga, helmet vanga and Bernier's vanga are restricted to rainforest in the east of the island. Lafresnaye's vanga and the recently discovered red-shouldered vanga occur in subarid thorn scrub in the south-west.

== Behaviour ==
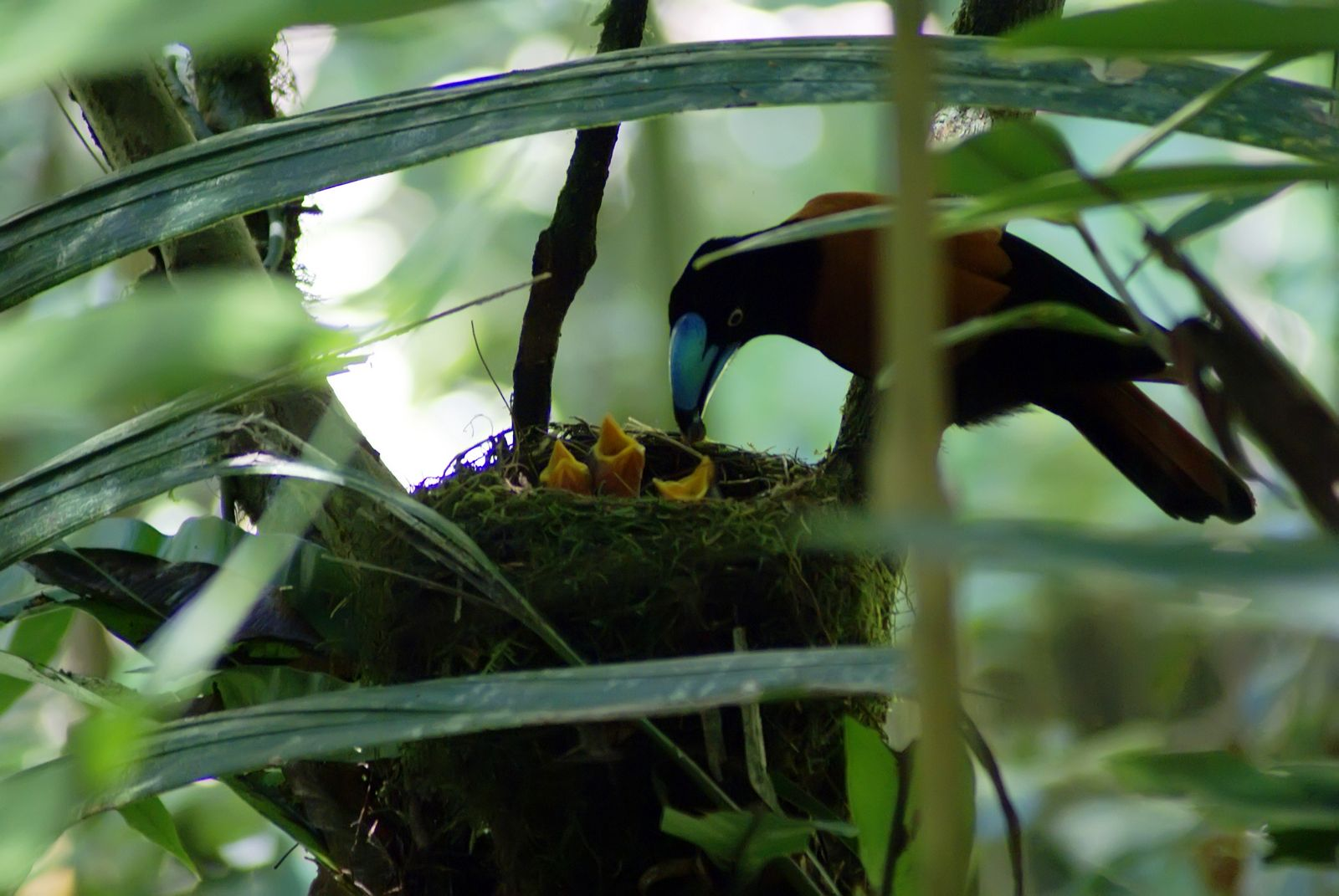
a helmet vanga feeding nestlings

Their diet can include insects, earthworms, millipedes, lizards and amphibians. The blue vanga and chabert vanga occasionally eat fruit. Many species feed in small groups, often in mixed-species foraging flocks. The hook-billed vanga and Lafresnaye's vanga tend to forage alone. Vangas have a variety of different foraging strategies. Many species glean food as they move through the branches. The nuthatch vanga climbs up trunks and branches like a nuthatch but does not climb downwards as nuthatches do. Crossley's vanga forages by walking along the forest floor amongst the leaf litter. The chabert vanga and the tylas vanga often fly into the air to catch prey. The three Xenopirostris vangas use their laterally flattened bills to strip bark off trees to search for food underneath.

Most species nest in pairs, building cup-shaped nests using twigs, bark, roots and leaves. The sickle-billed vanga nests in groups and builds a large nest of sticks.

== Status and conservation ==
Some species of vanga are common such as the chabert vanga which can survive in secondary woodland and plantations of introduced trees. Several other species are threatened by loss of their forest habitat. Pollen's vanga is classed as near-threatened by BirdLife International and the red-shouldered vanga, Bernier's vanga, helmet vanga and red-tailed newtonia are regarded as vulnerable. Van Dam's vanga is classed as endangered because it is restricted to a small area of north-west Madagascar where the forest is rapidly disappearing due to clearance for agriculture and uncontrolled bushfires.

== Species list ==
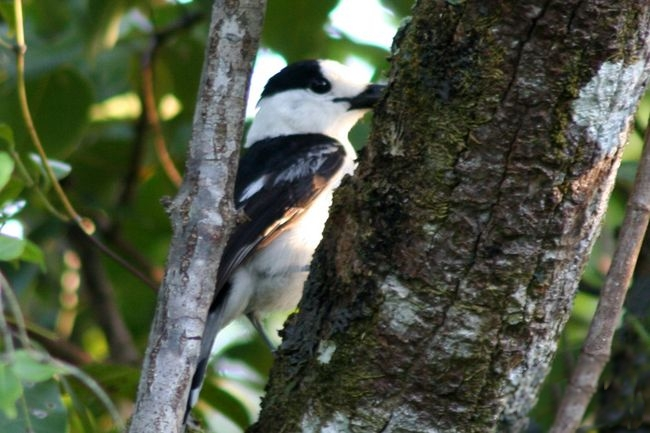
Hook-billed vanga (Vanga curvirostris)

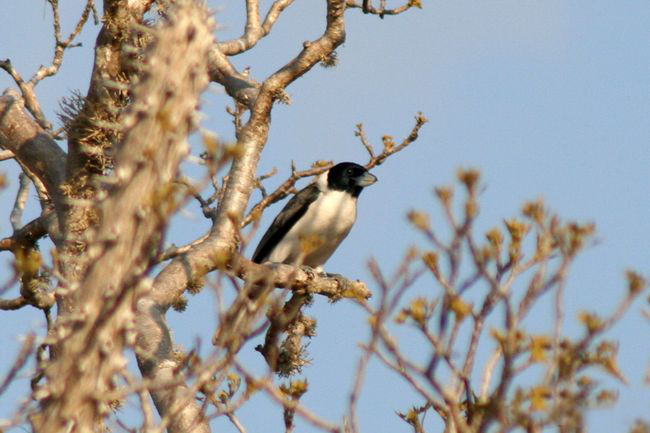
Lafresnaye's vanga (Xenopirostris xenopirostris)

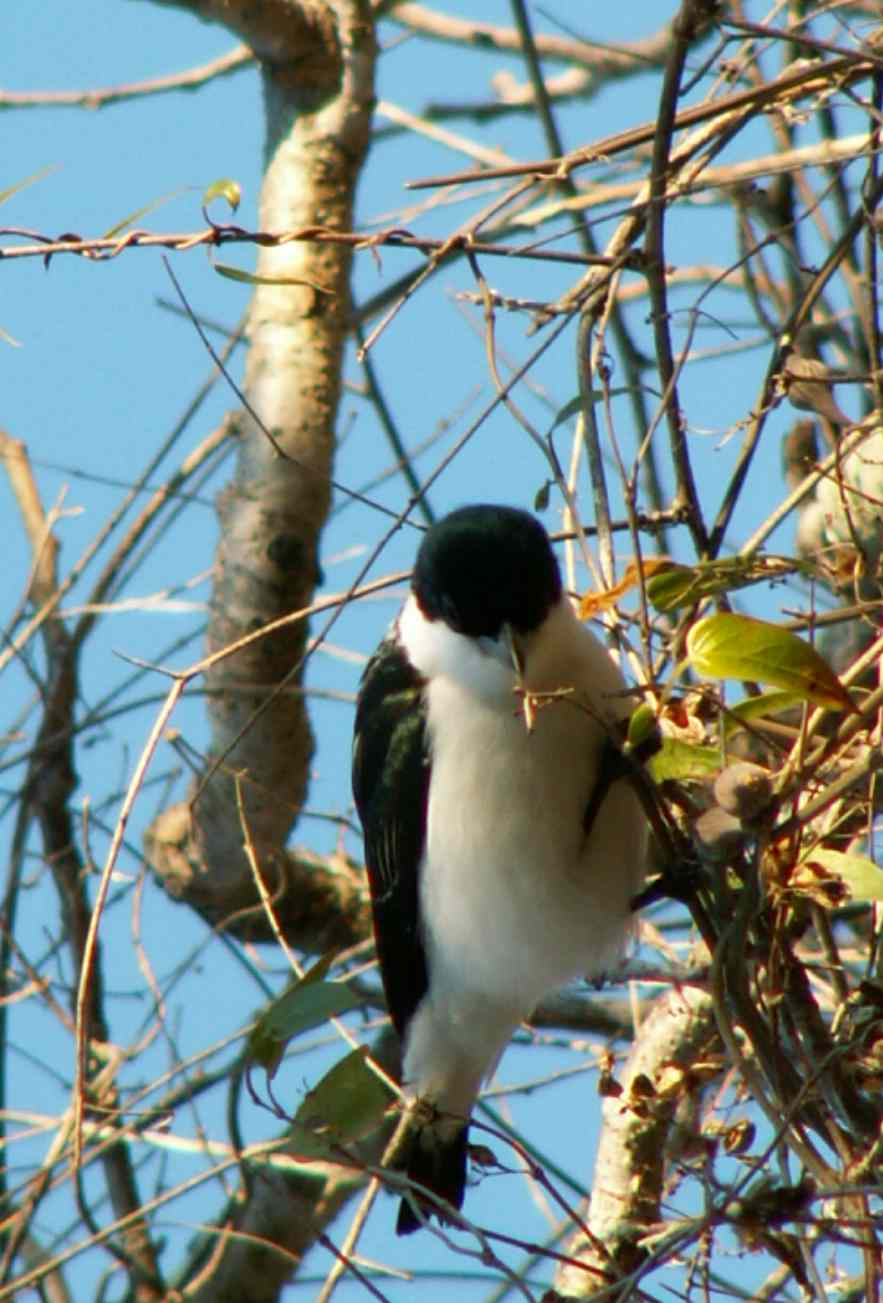
Chabert vanga (Leptopterus chabert)

The family contains 21 genera and 40 species.

FAMILY: VANGIDAE

- Genus: Calicalicus
  - Red-tailed vanga, Calicalicus madagascariensis
  - Red-shouldered vanga, Calicalicus rufocarpalis
- Genus: Schetba
  - Rufous vanga, Schetba rufa
- Genus: Vanga
  - Hook-billed vanga, Vanga curvirostris
- Genus: Xenopirostris
  - Lafresnaye's vanga, Xenopirostris xenopirostris
  - Van Dam's vanga, Xenopirostris damii
  - Pollen's vanga, Xenopirostris polleni
- Genus: Falculea
  - Sickle-billed vanga, Falculea palliata
- Genus: Artamella
  - White-headed vanga, Artamella viridis
- Genus: Leptopterus
  - Chabert vanga, Leptopterus chabert
- Genus: Cyanolanius
  - Madagascar blue vanga, Cyanolanius madagascarinus
  - Comoros blue vanga, Cyanolanius comorensis.
- Genus: Oriolia
  - Bernier's vanga, Oriolia bernieri
- Genus: Euryceros
  - Helmet vanga, Euryceros prevostii
- Genus: Tylas
  - Tylas vanga, Tylas eduardi
- Genus: Hypositta
  - Nuthatch vanga or coral-billed nuthatch vanga, Hypositta corallirostris
- Genus: Newtonia
  - Dark newtonia, Newtonia amphichroa
  - Common newtonia, Newtonia brunneicauda
  - Archbold's newtonia, Newtonia archboldi
  - Red-tailed newtonia, Newtonia fanovanae
- Genus: Prionops
  - Yellow-crested helmetshrike, Prionops alberti
  - Red-billed helmetshrike, Prionops caniceps
  - Rufous-bellied helmetshrike, Prionops rufiventris
  - Gabela helmetshrike, Prionops gabela
  - White-crested helmetshrike, Prionops plumatus
  - Grey-crested helmetshrike, Prionops poliolophus
  - Retz's helmetshrike, Prionops retzii
  - Chestnut-fronted helmetshrike, Prionops scopifrons
- Genus: Mystacornis
  - Crossley's vanga, Mystacornis crossleyi
- Genus: Bias
  - Black-and-white shrike-flycatcher, Bias musicus
- Genus: Megabyas
  - African shrike-flycatcher, Megabyas flammulatus
- Genus: Hemipus
  - Black-winged flycatcher-shrike, Hemipus hirundinaceus
  - Bar-winged flycatcher-shrike, Hemipus picatus
- Genus: Tephrodornis
  - Large woodshrike, Tephrodornis gularis
  - Malabar woodshrike, Tephrodornis sylvicola
  - Common woodshrike, Tephrodornis pondicerianus
  - Sri Lanka woodshrike, Tephrodornis affinis
- Genus: Philentoma
  - Rufous-winged philentoma, Philentoma pyrhoptera
  - Maroon-breasted philentoma, Philentoma velata
- Genus: Pseudobias
  - Ward's vanga, Pseudobias wardi
