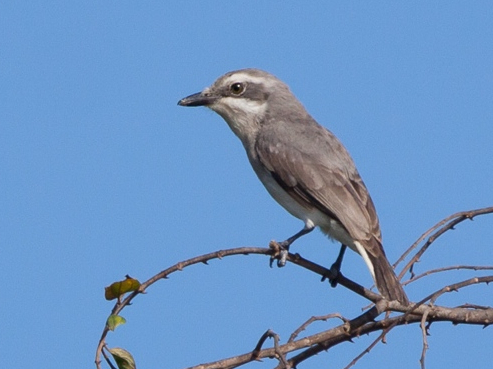

Conservation status
- Least Concern (IUCN 3.1)

Scientific classification
- Kingdom: Animalia
- Phylum: Chordata
- Class: Aves
- Order: Passeriformes
- Family: Vangidae
- Genus: Tephrodornis
- Species: T. affinis

Binomial name
- Tephrodornis affinis Blyth, 1847

= Sri Lanka woodshrike =

Species of bird

The Sri Lanka woodshrike (Tephrodornis affinis ) is a species of bird in the family Vangidae. It is found on Sri Lanka. It is sometimes considered a subspecies of the common woodshrike.
