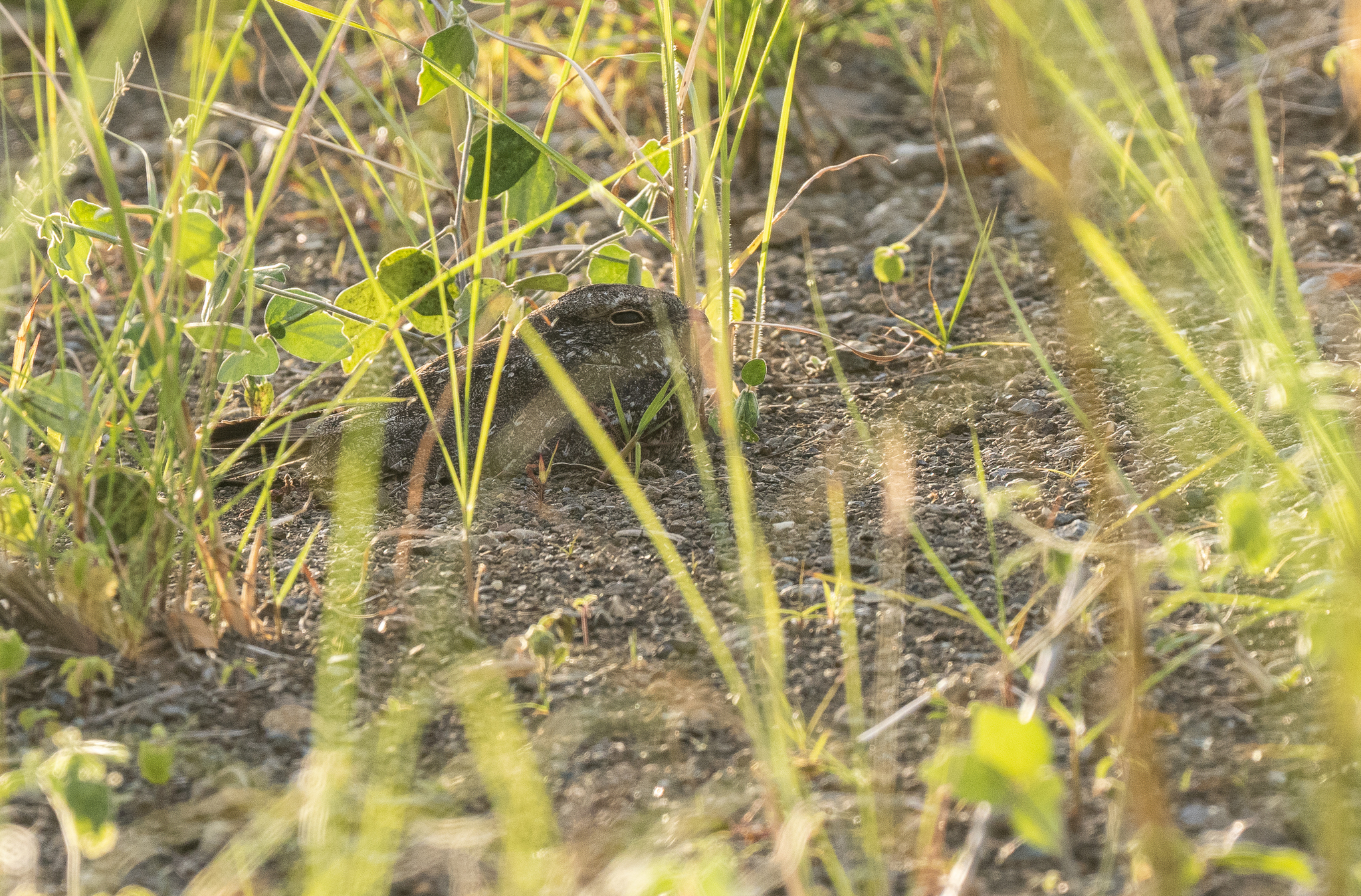

Scientific classification
- Kingdom: Animalia
- Phylum: Chordata
- Class: Aves
- Order: Caprimulgiformes
- Family: Caprimulgidae
- Genus: Caprimulgus
- Species: C. griseatus

Binomial name
- Caprimulgus griseatus Walden, 1875

= Chirruping nightjar =

Species of bird

The chirruping nightjar or kayumanggi nightjar (Caprimulgus griseatus) is a species of nightjar found in the Philippines. This species was formerly conspecific with the Savanna nightjar but was designated as its own distinct species due to its difference in calls.

== Description and taxonomy ==
It was once considered conspecific with the savanna nightjar, while it is significantly different in vocalization. This name Chirruping is based on its distinct high pitched call. Its alternate name Kayumanggi is a Tagolog word for brown, often used when describing a person's skin color.

=== Subspecies ===
Two subspecies are recognized:

- C. g. griseatus– Found on Luzon, Catanduanes, Sibuyan Island, Mindoro, Negros and Cebu
- C. g. mindanensis – Found on Mindanao; poorly known and no recent confirmed records, may possibly be a different species altogether.

== Ecology and behavior ==
This species is an insectivore. It forages in flight and hawks flying insects.

Breeding habits are poorly known but season is believed to be around March to May.

== Habitat and conservation status ==
It occurs in grassland, open woodland, forest with scrubby outcrops, farmland, riverbanks and dried riverbeds. This species has been recorded in areas as high as 1,500 meters above sea level.

This is a newly split species and has yet to be assessed by the International Union for Conservation of Nature. This bird is believed to be common in its habitat. However, like most species in the Philippines, its population is still likely on the decline due to rapid urbanization and habitat degradation.
