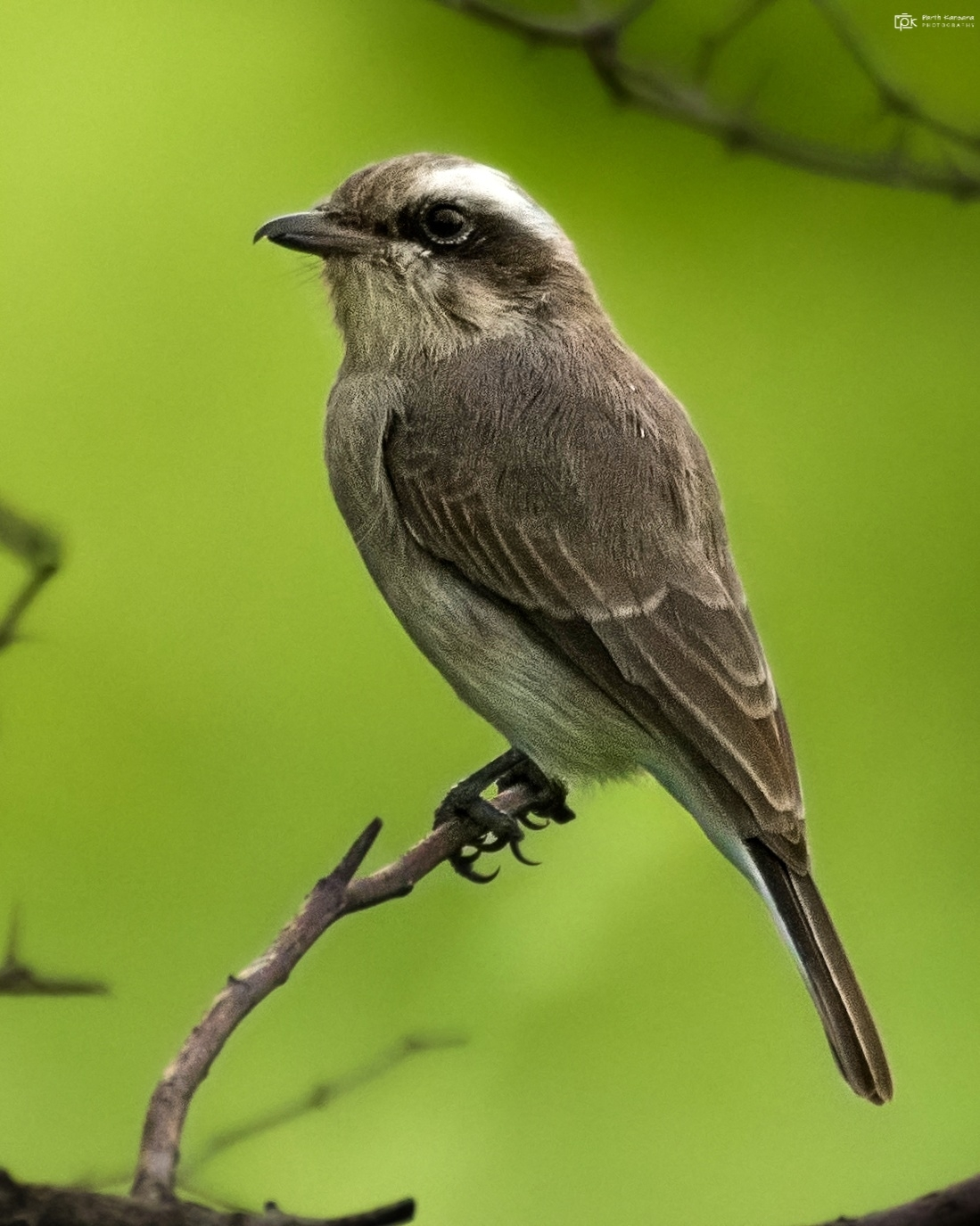
- Common woodshrike Tephrodornis pondicerianus

Scientific classification
- Kingdom: Animalia
- Phylum: Chordata
- Class: Aves
- Order: Passeriformes
- Family: Vangidae
- Genus: Tephrodornis; Swainson, 1832

Type species
- Lanius virgatus Temminck, 1824

= Tephrodornis =

Genus of birds

The woodshrikes are a genus, Tephrodornis, of birds in the family Vangidae.

== Taxonomy ==
The genus Tephrodornis was introduced in 1832 by the English naturalist William Swainson with the large woodshrike as the type species. The genus name combines the Ancient Greek tephōdēs meaning "like ashes" or "ash-coloured" with ornis meaning "bird".

The genus contains four species:

Image	Common name	Scientific name	Distribution
	Large woodshrike	Tephrodornis virgatus	Southeastern Asia, Sumatra, Java, and Borneo.
	Malabar woodshrike	Tephrodornis sylvicola	Western India.
	Common woodshrike	Tephrodornis pondicerianus	Across Asia.
	Sri Lanka woodshrike	Tephrodornis affinis	Sri Lanka.
