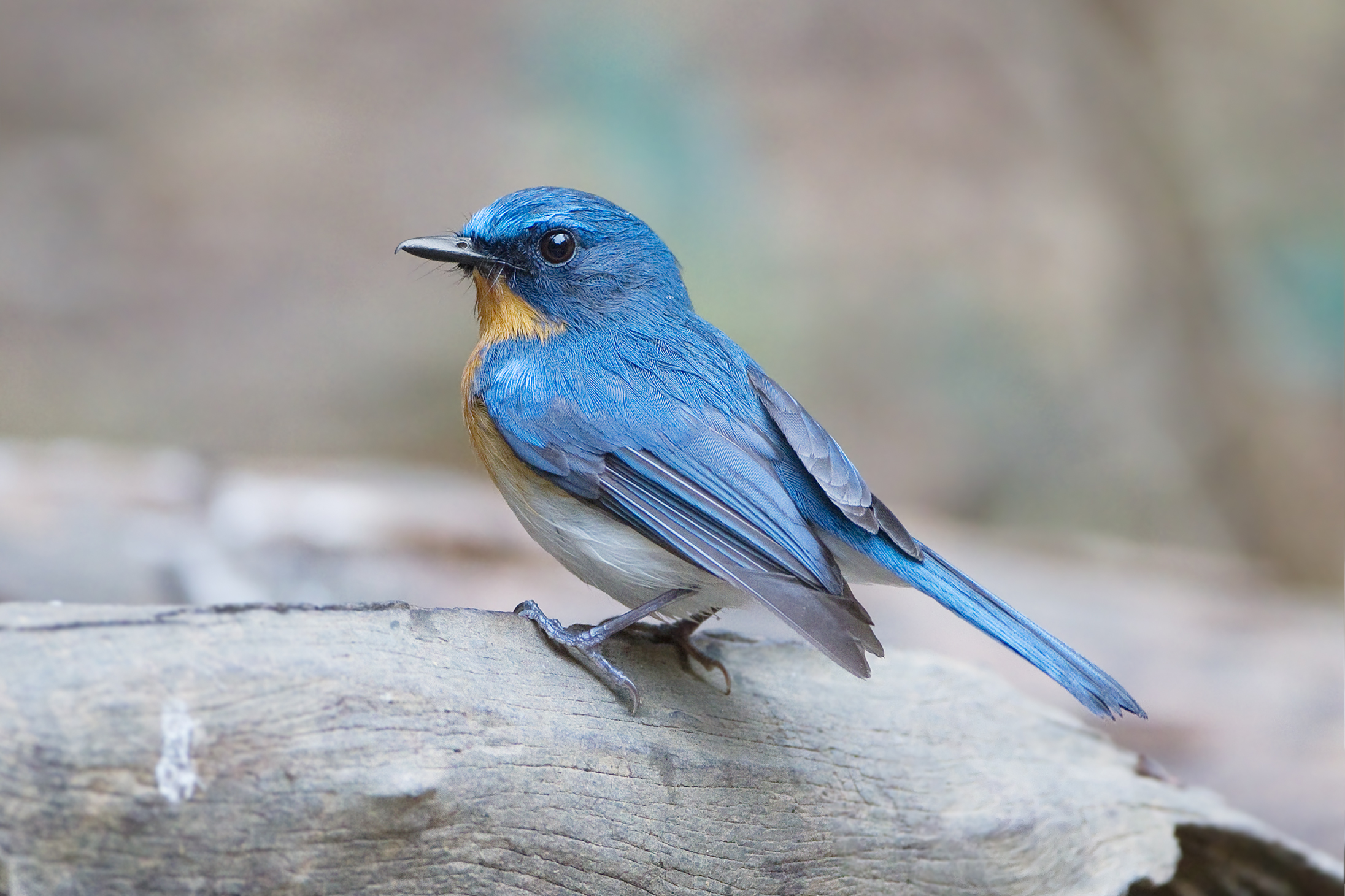
- Male, Thailand

Conservation status
- Least Concern (IUCN 3.1)

Scientific classification
- Kingdom: Animalia
- Phylum: Chordata
- Class: Aves
- Order: Passeriformes
- Family: Muscicapidae
- Genus: Cyornis
- Species: C. sumatrensis

Binomial name
- Cyornis sumatrensis (Sharpe, 1879)

= Indochinese blue flycatcher =

Species of bird

The Indochinese blue flycatcher (Cyornis sumatrensis) is a species of bird in the family Muscicapidae. It is found from southern Myanmar and the Malay Peninsula to Indochina and northeastern Sumatra. It was previously considered conspecific with Tickell's blue flycatcher.

The species shows regional variations in plumage and size and several of these populations have been designated with subspecies names. The population in Thailand and southern Myanmar is named as indochina. Further south is the form sumatrensis (Sumatra Island, Malay Peninsula) and lamprus on Anamba Islands.

A species of feather mite Proterothrix cyornis has been described from an Indochinese blue flycatcher from Vietnam.
