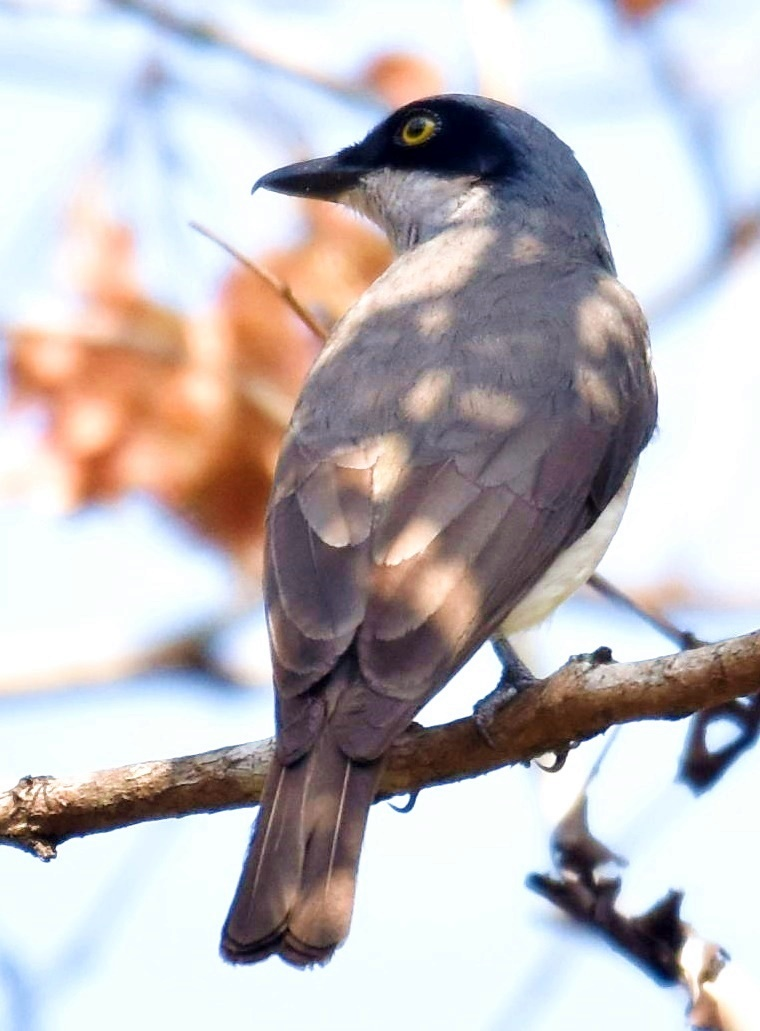

Conservation status
- Least Concern (IUCN 3.1)

Scientific classification
- Kingdom: Animalia
- Phylum: Chordata
- Class: Aves
- Order: Passeriformes
- Family: Vangidae
- Genus: Tephrodornis
- Species: T. sylvicola

Binomial name
- Tephrodornis sylvicola Jerdon, 1839

Audio

= Malabar woodshrike =

Species of bird

The Malabar woodshrike (Tephrodornis sylvicola) is a species of bird usually placed in the family Vangidae. It is found in western India. It is sometimes considered a subspecies of the large woodshrike.

== Gallery ==
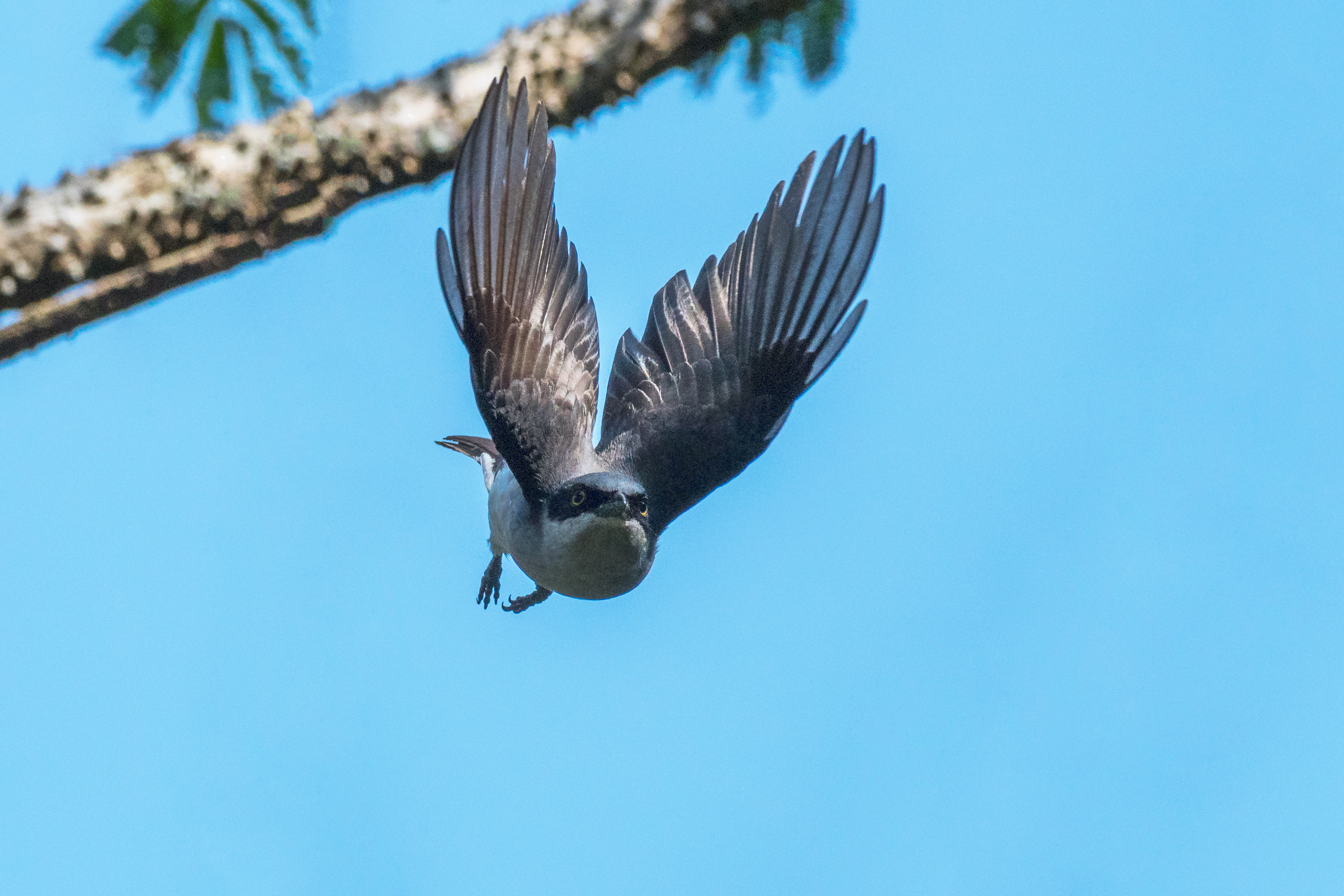
In flight in Kerala, southern India

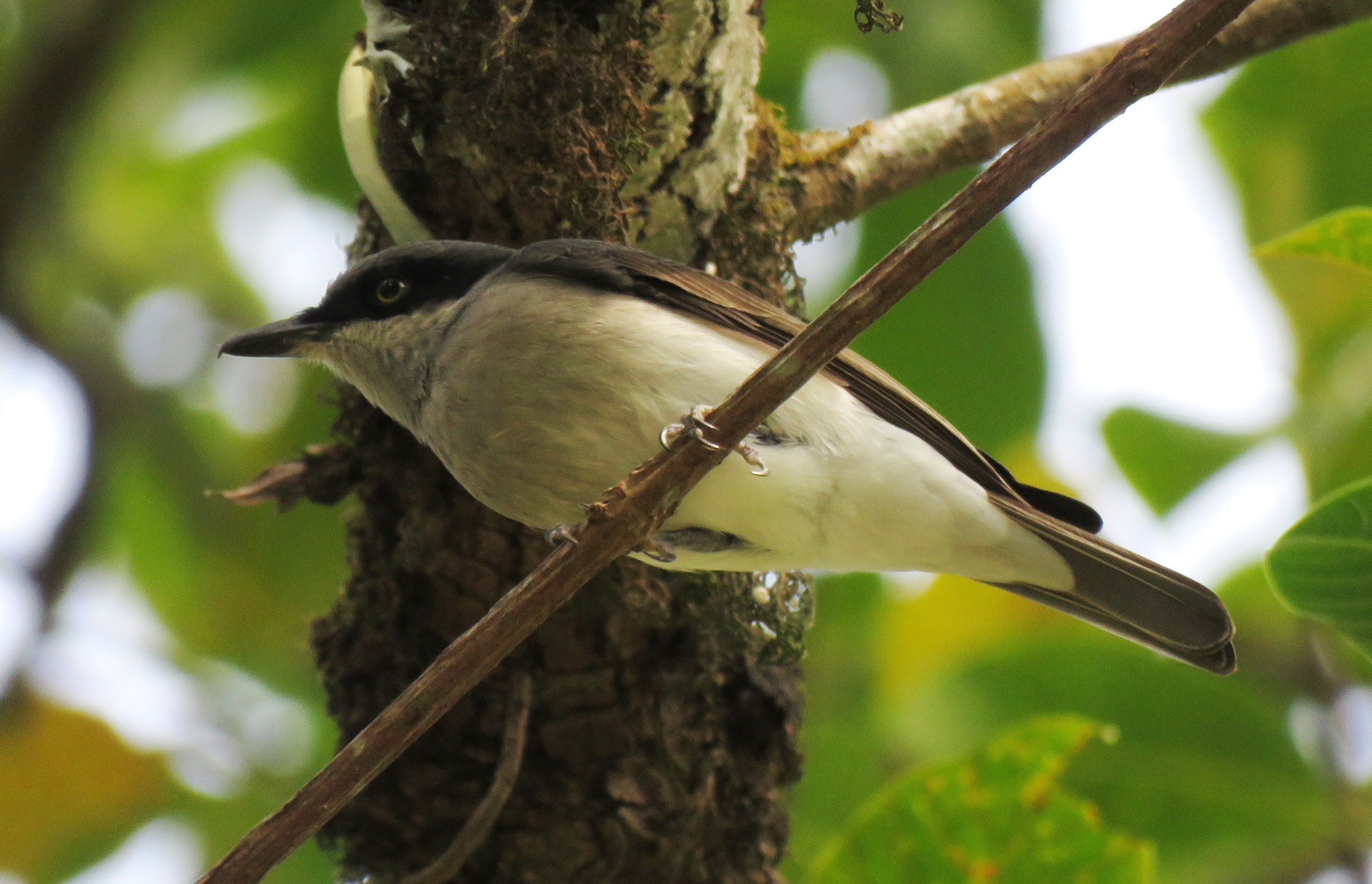
Foraging in canopy in Tamil Nadu, southern India
