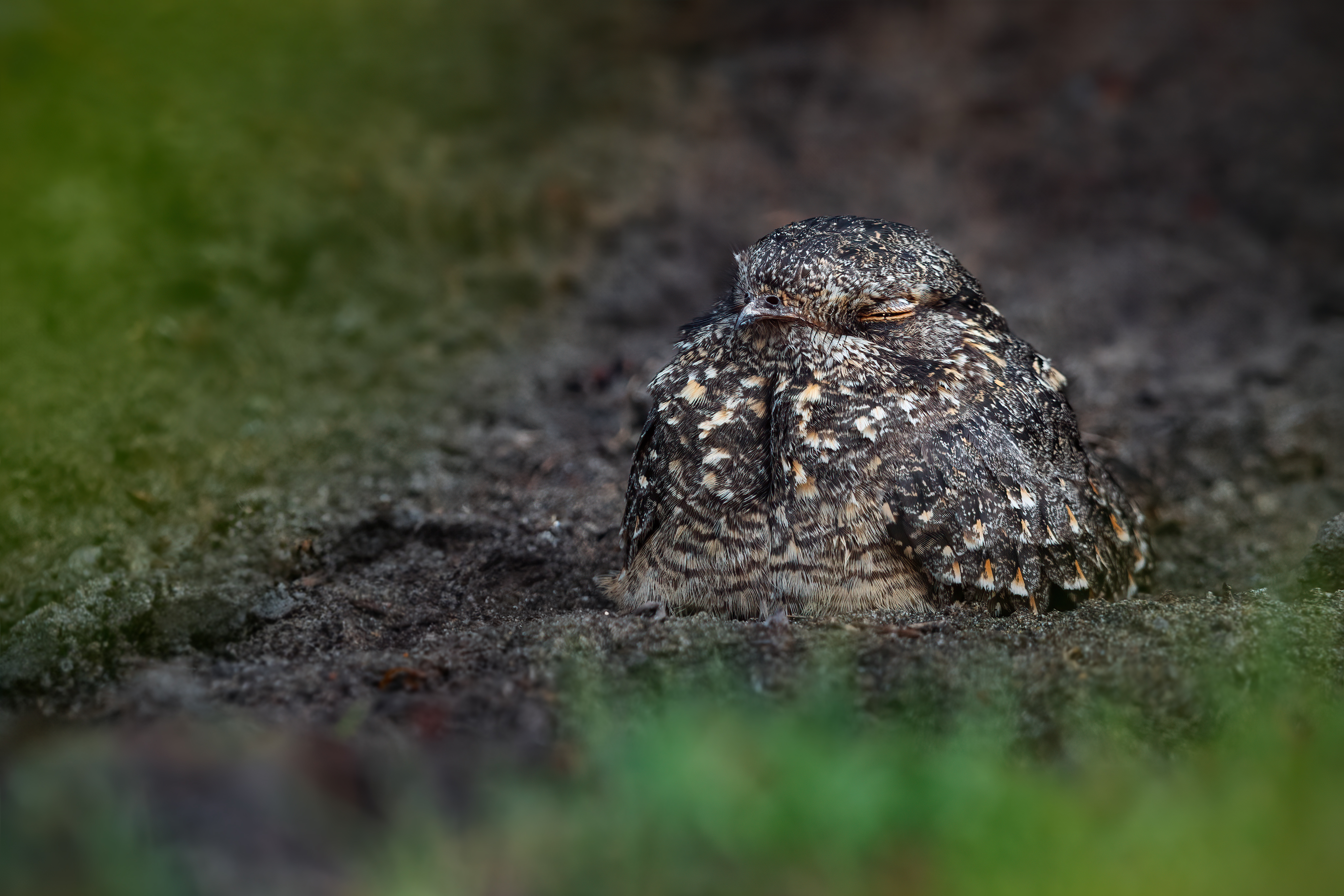

Conservation status
- Least Concern (IUCN 3.1)

Scientific classification
- Kingdom: Animalia
- Phylum: Chordata
- Class: Aves
- Order: Caprimulgiformes
- Family: Caprimulgidae
- Genus: Caprimulgus
- Species: C. affinis

Binomial name
- Caprimulgus affinis Horsfield, 1821
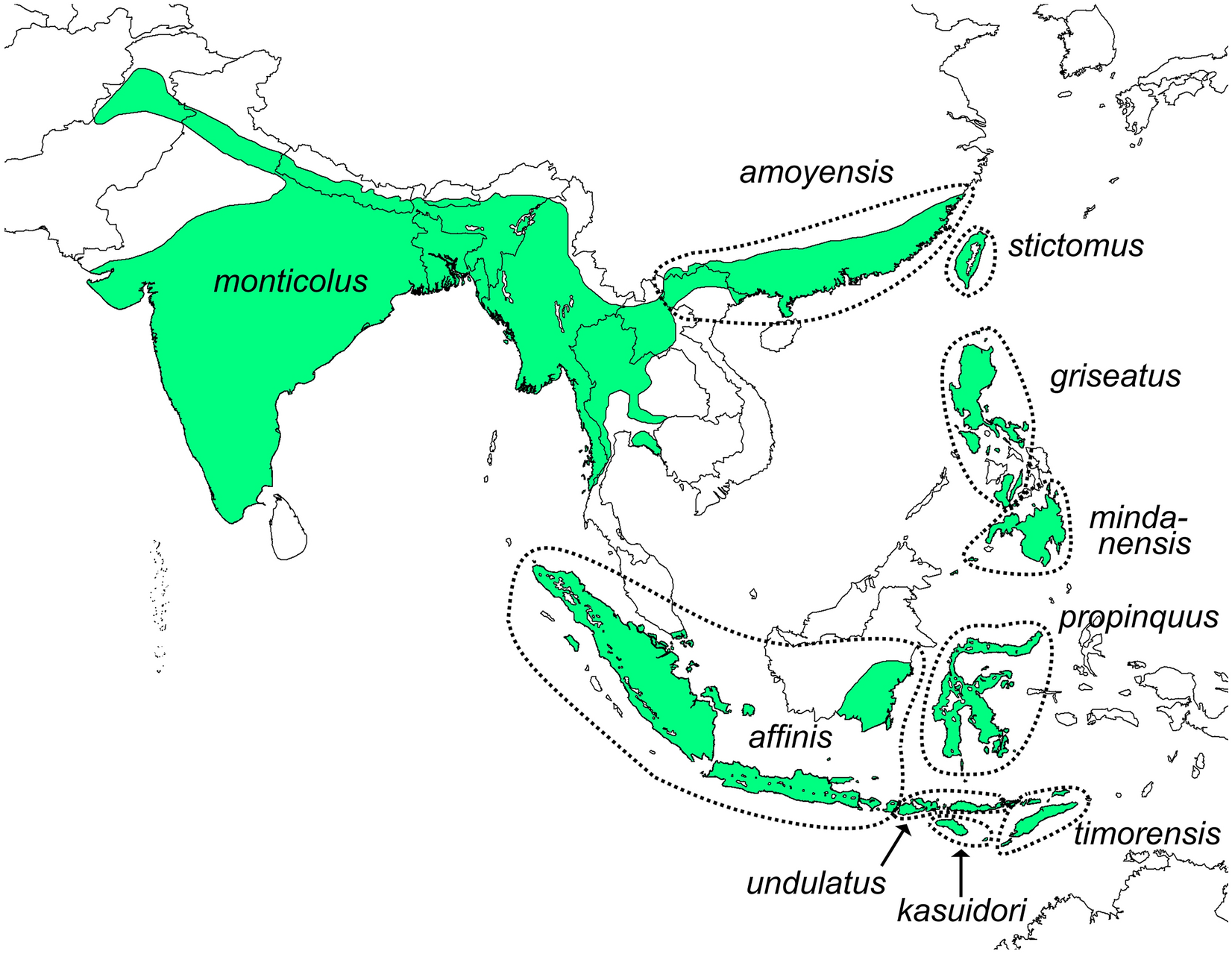
- Distribution map of savanna nightjar by subspecies.

Audio
- Calls of C. a. monticolus (Rajasthan)

= Savanna nightjar =

Species of bird

The savanna nightjar (Caprimulgus affinis), also known as allied nightjar or Franklin's nightjar, is a species of nightjar found in South and Southeast Asia. The IUCN Red List has assessed the species to be of least concern because it has a large range and its population trend is stable. As other nightjars, this nocturnal bird is characterised by its large eyes, gaping mouth and excellent camouflage. It can be distinguished from similar south Asian nightjar species, like the chirruping nightjar, by its unique vocalisations.

== Taxonomy and systematics ==
The savanna nightjar belongs to the diverse family Caprimulgidae along with 89 other species, 39 of which share the genus Caprimulgus. Currently eight subspecies are recognized: C. a. monticolus, C. a. amoyensis, C. a. stictomus, C. a. affinis, C. a. kasuidori, C. a. timorensis, C. a. Propinquus and C. a. griseatus. A recent study on variation in vocalisations found significant differences between the northern (C. a. monticolus, C. a. amoyensis, C. a. stictomus), southern (C. a. affinis, C. a. kasuidori, C. a. timorensis and C. a. propinquus) and Philippine (C. a. griseatus) subspecies, suggesting they may represent three separate species. This proposal comes over 100 years after ornithologist Richard Bowdler Sharpe described C. monticolus, C. affinis and C. griseatus as separate species, with each species corresponding to one of the previously mentioned geographic regions. Despite Sharpes early work, taxonomic authorities throughout the twentieth century regarded them as a single species, which has now become the universally accepted standard. The newly discovered vocal variation is based on the fact that non-passerines, like nightjars, do not exhibit vocal learning, meaning that differences likely reflect genetic divergence. These groups are also geographically separated, and have differences in size and plumage. Molecular and genetic research is necessary to reveal more about how these species are truly related.

== Habitat and distribution ==
The savanna nightjar has a widespread range stretching from northern Pakistan to Indonesia, with different subspecies occupying different parts of the range. Populations are widely distributed in south China, Pakistan, India, Indonesia and Taiwan, where they occupy low-land open grasslands, sugar cane plantations, wheat fields, or rocky soils around rivers and streams. With the increase of urban development across southern Asia, the roofs of tall buildings have proven to be an ideal nesting site for savanna nightjars, a phenomenon observed in Indonesia and Taiwan. The migration of savanna nightjars is poorly understood, as different subspecies vary from nonmigratory to locally migratory. C. a. Monticolus migrates through the Punjab plains to northeastern Pakistan for summer breeding.

== Description ==
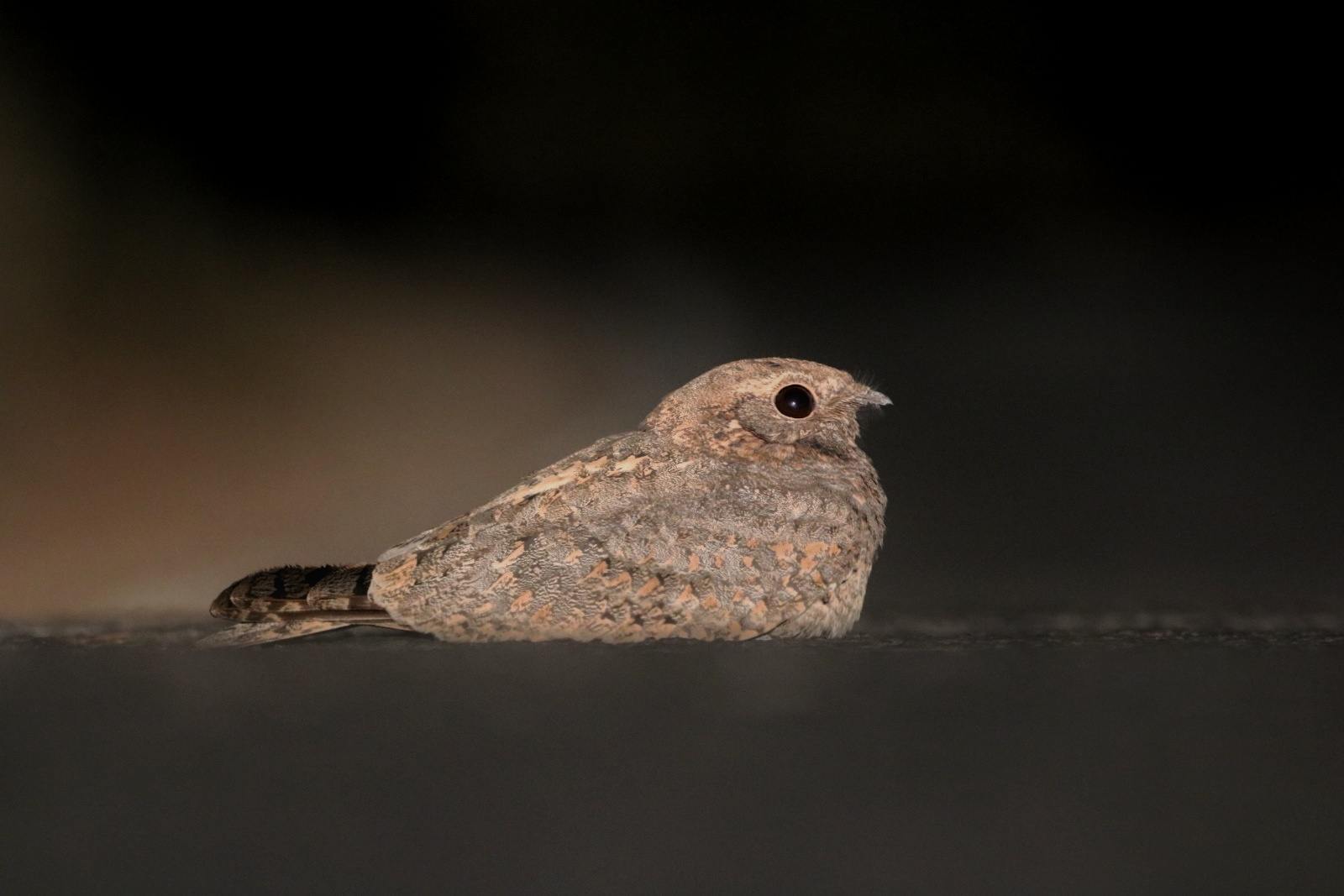
Female adult savanna nightjar, note the lack of white throat patch.

The savanna nightjar measures 20-26cm in length, has a body weight of 54-110g, and a wingspan of 64cm, with size varying by subspecies, ranging from small to medium-large. Like other nightjars, they have long pointed wings and small legs and feet, indicating their reliance on flight over walking. The bill is wide, revealing a large gape when opened, and is surrounded by facial feathers, called rictal bristles. Their vermiculated grey-brown plumage, characteristic of all nightjars, makes them difficult to tell apart from other species based on sight alone. However, males and females do exhibit sexual dimorphism and can be distinguished based on the presence of white throat patches. Male savanna nightjars have distinct white patches on their throat, tail and wings. In comparison, females have subtle throat patches, a red tint to their feathers and a lack of white patches on the tail. Immature and juvenile savanna nightjars resemble adult females, they lack white patches and have mottled colouration.

== Behaviour and ecology ==
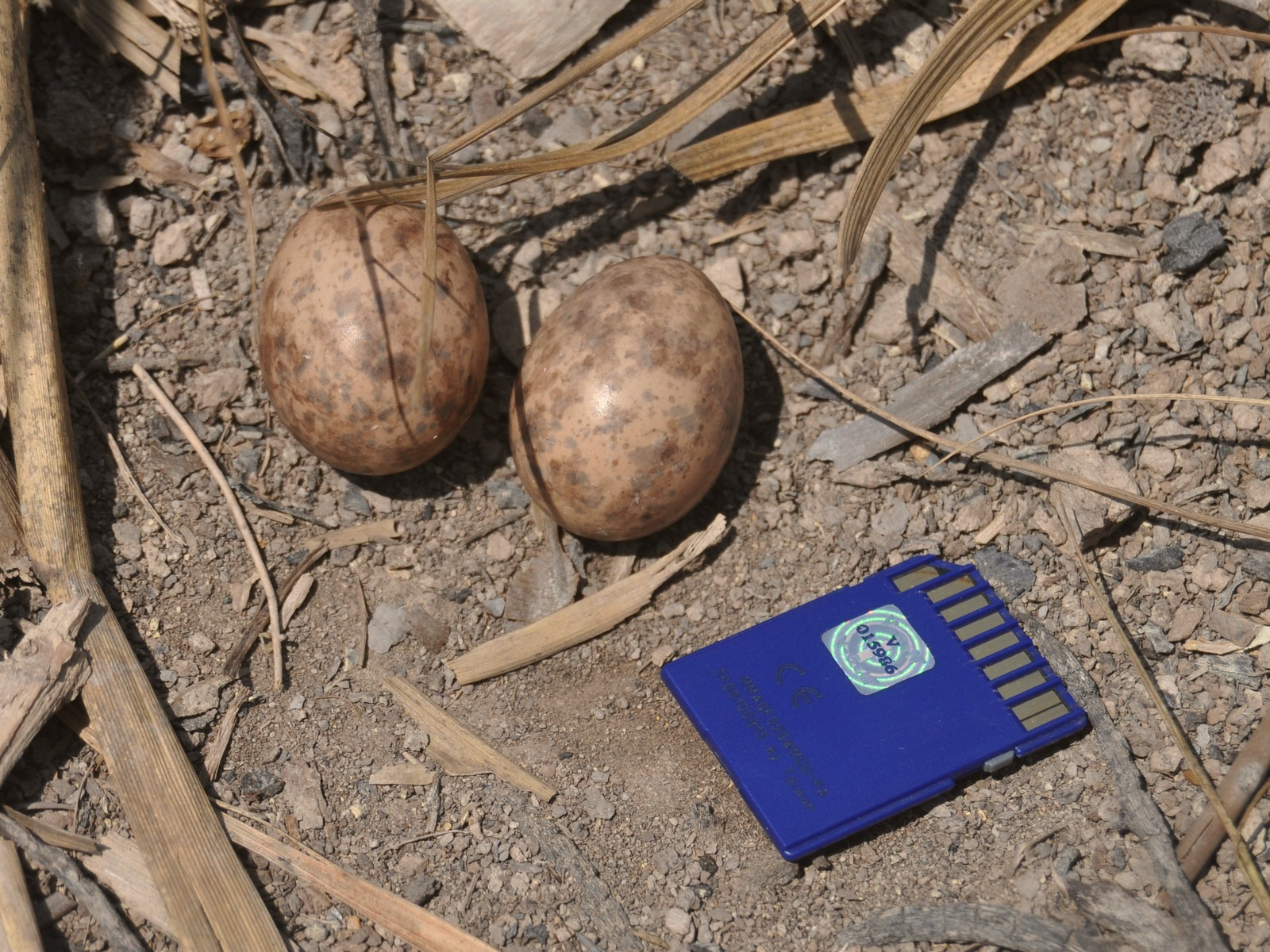
Savanna nightjar eggs

=== Reproduction ===
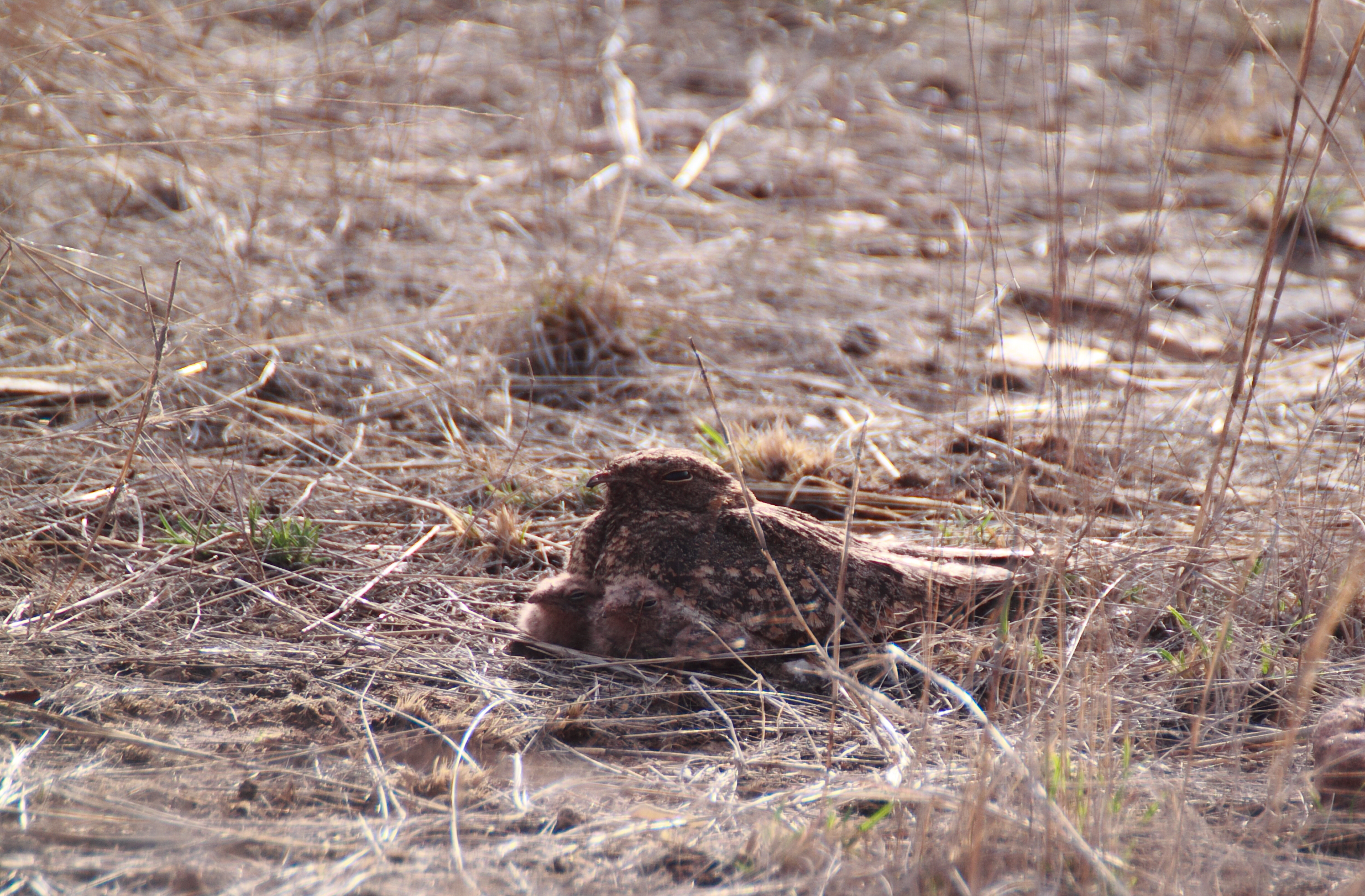
Brooding female savanna nightjar and chicks

Breeding season of the savanna nightjar varies among subspecies, occurring from March–August in the western range and March–January in the eastern range. Typical of most nightjar species, the savanna nightjar nests in open and exposed places. Nests are not constructed, instead eggs are laid on the ground in low-elevation rocky soils or open spaces. 1–2 pale pink, blotched eggs are laid, which camouflage into the stones surrounding them. The eggs are incubated by the female, while the male parent guards the nest. Incubation time is unknown. Being precocial, savanna nightjar chicks are active and mobile 4 days after hatching. Parents defend their eggs and young by feigning injury, a behaviour which provides an advantage to birds nesting in open areas, where they are more vulnerable to predators than cavity nesters. To divert the attention of predators, savanna nightjar parents will act injured or crippled, luring the predators away from the nest at the risk of their own survival. As with adult savanna nightjars, the chicks exhibit excellent camouflage to provide them added protection.

=== Vocalisation ===
Savanna nightjars begin vocalisation during early dusk and can be heard throughout the night until dawn, becoming especially vocal during breeding. The characteristic "chwip" call is used for both marking territory and attracting females during breeding season. Females vocalise less, emitting soft squeaks during brooding. Savanna nightjars vocalise while in flight or perched on the ground, in low vegetation and urban structures like rooftops or poles. Analysis of vocalisations across the subspecies revealed significant differences in frequencies and length of calls. The Philippine group has a raspier call than the northern and southern subspecies. The northern group has longer calls with higher variation in frequency than the southern group.

=== Diet ===
The savanna nightjar is a nocturnal, insectivorous bird, most active in feeding from dusk to dawn. Hunting by sight, their large eyes and massive gape allows them to capture insects in flight and near-darkness, a technique called sallying. During a sally, the bird spots an insect, spreads its wings, dives at it, and captures the prey in its beak before either landing on a nearby branch or returning to its perch. Moths compose 80-85% of savanna nightjar food composition, but they also feed on beetles, ants, grasshoppers, crickets, wasps and bees. Their rictal bristles serve two potential purposes: serving as a "scoop" in prey capture, and protecting the eyes from impact with hard-bodied insects or stinging or biting prey.

== Relationship with humans ==
A population of savanna nightjars have slowly expanded their range away from their natural habitats into the urban areas of Taiwan. Heard at night especially during the breeding season, the savanna nightjars booming call can reach up to 90 decibels and has become a nuisance to residents. In an attempt to remedy the sleep disruption and nightmares the calls have caused, citizens have resorted to firecrackers and flashlights in an attempt to drive away the birds. Urbanised savanna nightjars prefer to nest on flat roofs, most likely due to lack of predators. As their native habitats continue to be altered by dams, flooding and dredging, this population of savanna nightjars is expected to continue expanding to all major cities in Taiwan.
