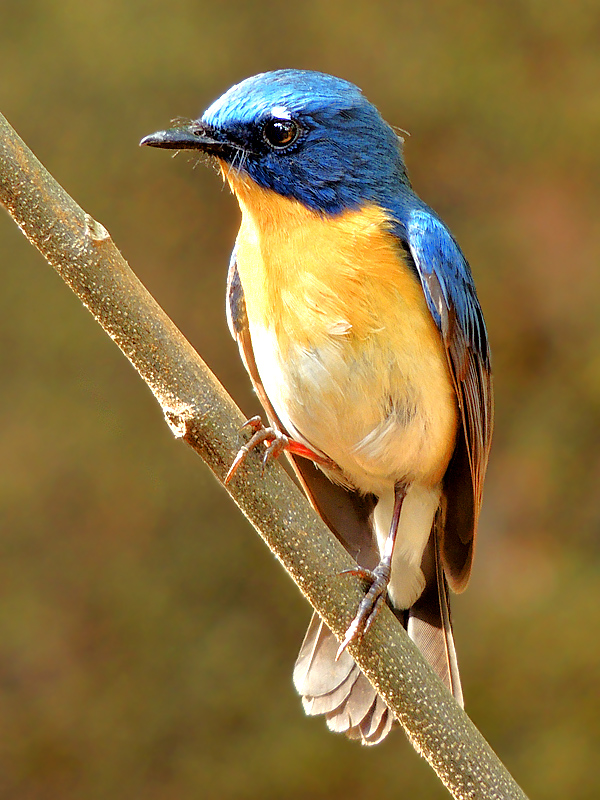

Conservation status
- Least Concern (IUCN 3.1)

Scientific classification
- Kingdom: Animalia
- Phylum: Chordata
- Class: Aves
- Order: Passeriformes
- Family: Muscicapidae
- Genus: Cyornis
- Species: C. tickelliae

Binomial name
- Cyornis tickelliae Blyth, 1843

Synonyms
- Muscicapa tickelliae Cyornis tickelli Muscicapula tickelliae

= Tickell's blue flycatcher =

Tickell's blue-flycatcher

Species of bird

Tickell's blue flycatcher (Cyornis tickelliae) is a small passerine bird in the flycatcher family. This is an insectivorous species which breeds in tropical Asia, from the Indian subcontinent eastwards to Bangladesh and western Myanmar. The Indochinese blue flycatcher was formerly considered conspecific. They are blue on the upperparts and the throat and breast are rufous. They are found in dense scrub to forest habitats. The name commemorates the wife of the British ornithologist Samuel Tickell who collected in India and Burma.

== Description ==
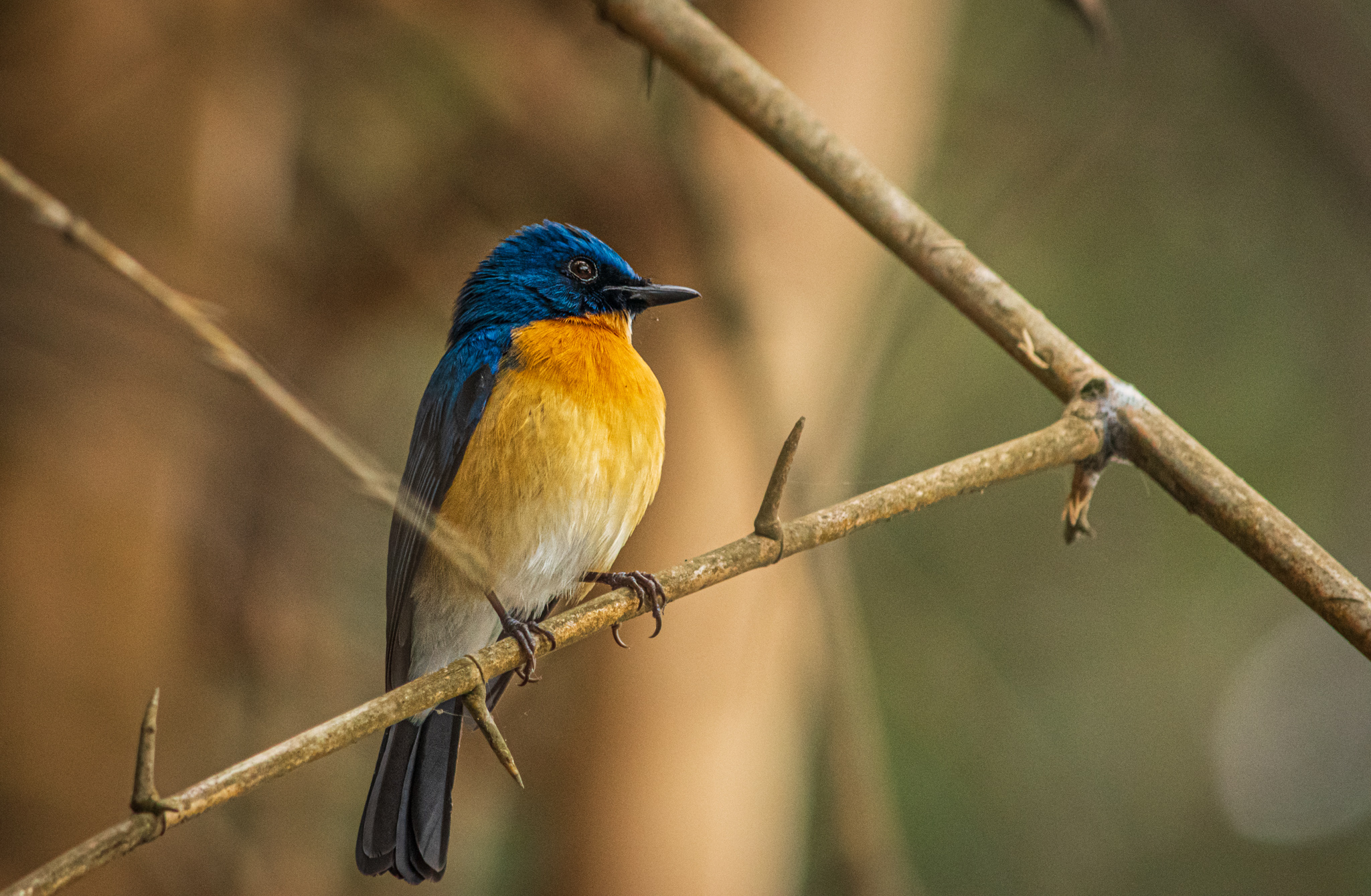
From southern India

Tickell's blue flycatcher is about 11–12 cm long. It sits upright and forages mainly in the overgrowth. The male's upper parts are bright blue, its throat and breast are red, and the rest of the underparts are white. The female is duller blue with a brighter blue brow, shoulder, rump, and tail. It hybridizes with the pale-chinned blue flycatcher (Cyornis poliogenys) in the Eastern Ghats of India and these hybrids have sometimes been treated as a subspecies vernayi. The juvenile is streaked and has a spotted mantle, scaly brown upperparts, head and breast, with just the wings and tail being blue.

They have sometimes been known to feed even after dusk. Apart from flying insects they may occasionally pick up crawling insects.

The species shows regional variations in plumage and size and several of these populations have been designated with subspecies names. The nominate form is found in India, Nepal and Myanmar. The Sri Lankan population is separated as jerdoni (or nesea/mesaea said to be darker) The Sri Lankan population is C. t. jerdoni which has a longer bill. C. t. indochina extends in range from Myanmar, through Thailand into Cambodia and Vietnam. Southern Thailand, peninsular Malaysia and northeast Sumatra has the population C. t. sumatrensis while lamprus is an insular population on Anamba Island. In the past this species has been considered as a subspecies of the blue-throated blue flycatcher (Cyornis rubeculoides) which resembles this but has a blue throat.

== Habitat and distribution ==
Tickell's blue flycatcher breeds in dry forest, scrub, bamboo and gardens.

== Behaviour and ecology ==
The metallic song of the bird includes a series of clicks followed by five or six notes that end abruptly. The metallic song consists of short clicks followed by five or six notes resembling that of the Spot-breasted fantail. Alarm calls include churr and clicking notes. It is a wary bird and is easily observed in small gardens too. It is a forest-loving species which is found in thick cover and shade, and particularly haunts the banks of wooded streams.

They feed mainly by capturing insects in flight but their prey include other insects such as termites and earwigs that may be gleaned or picked from the ground. Now they are being observed inhabiting garbage places. During the breeding season, they may take larger prey including small vertebrates. A bush frog has been reported as prey in Sri Lanka.

The breeding season is April to August (March to June in Sri Lanka). It nests in a hole in a tree or amongst rocks that is lined with fine grass and fibres and lay 3–5 eggs.

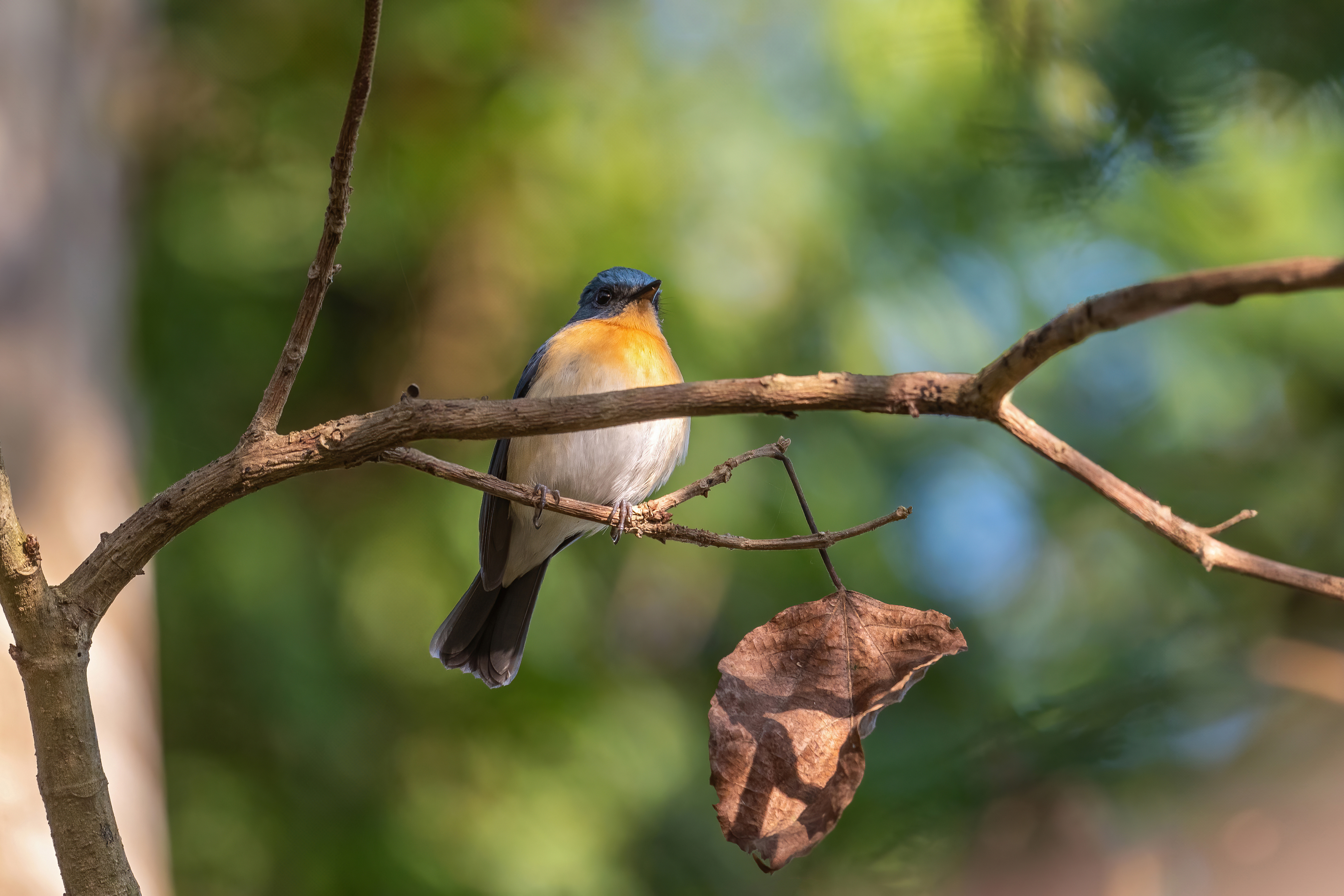
Cyornis tickelliae from Bardiya National Park, Nepal
