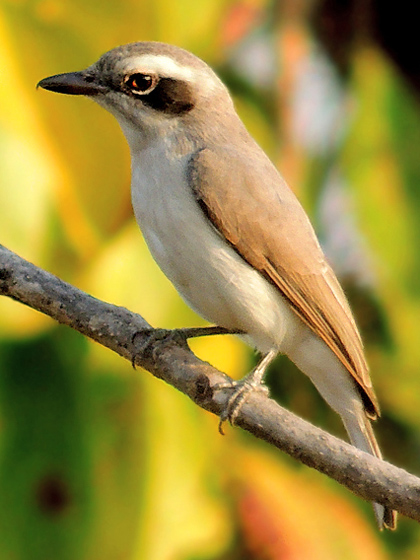
- T. p. pondicerianus, India Calls of T. p. pondicerianus Calls of T. p. pallidus

Conservation status
- Least Concern (IUCN 3.1)

Scientific classification
- Kingdom: Animalia
- Phylum: Chordata
- Class: Aves
- Order: Passeriformes
- Family: Vangidae
- Genus: Tephrodornis
- Species: T. pondicerianus

Binomial name
- Tephrodornis pondicerianus (Gmelin, JF, 1789)
- Rough distribution range

= Common woodshrike =

Species of bird

The common woodshrike (Tephrodornis pondicerianus) is a species of bird found in Asia. It is now usually considered a member of the family Vangidae. It is small and ashy brown with a dark cheek patch and a broad white brow. It is found across Asia mainly in thin forest and scrub habitats where they hunt insects, often joining other insectivorous birds. The form found in Sri Lanka which was treated as a subspecies is now usually considered a separate species, the Sri Lanka woodshrike.

== Taxonomy ==
The common woodshrike was formally described in 1789 by the German naturalist Johann Friedrich Gmelin in his revised and expanded edition of Carl Linnaeus's Systema Naturae. He placed it with the flycatchers in the genus Muscicapa and coined the binomial name Muscicapa pondiceriana. Gmelin based his description on the "Le gobe-mouches de Pondichéry" that had been described in 1782 by the French naturalist Pierre Sonnerat. The type locality was restricted from Pondicherry to Chennai by Claud Ticehurst in 1921. The common woodshrike is now one of four species placed in the genus Tephrodornis that was introduced in 1832 by the English naturalist William Swainson. The genus name combines the Ancient Greek tephōdēs meaning "like ashes" or "ash-coloured" with ornis meaning "bird".

Three subspecies are recognised:

- T. p. pallidus Ticehurst, 1920 – Pakistan and northwest India
- T. p. pondicerianus (Gmelin, JF, 1789) – east India to south Laos
- T. p. orientis Deignan, 1948 – Cambodia and south Vietnam

The Sri Lanka woodshrike (Tephrodornis affinis) was formerly treated as a subspecies. It was promoted to full species status based on its distinct plumage as well as its calls. Unlike the common woodshrike, the Sri Lanka woodshrike displays strong sexual dimorphism.

== Description ==
The common woodshrike is dully ashy brown and like other woodshrikes has a large head with a strong hooked beak. They have a broad creamy brow above a dark cheek patch and white outer tail feathers contrasting with their dark tail. Young birds have streaks and spot on the crown and white spots on the mantle. The underside is also streaked and the breast is heavily marked in young birds. The northern race pallidus is pale brown above and has brown rather than black central rectrices.

== Behaviour and ecology ==
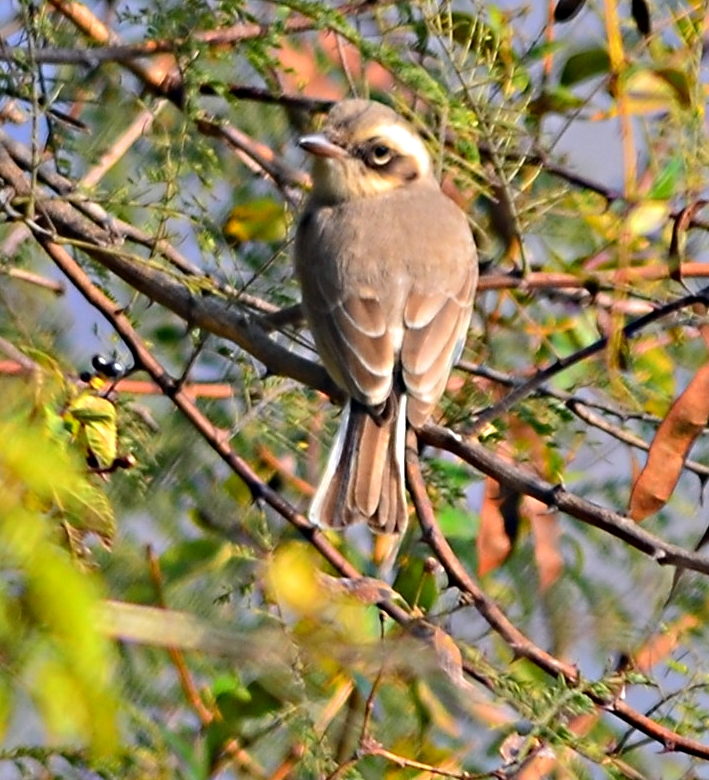
T. p. pallidus showing the white outer tail feathers and brown central tail feathers (Punjab).

Usually found in pairs, they have a loud whistling song made of several notes. The usual call is a plaintive weet-weet followed by a series of quick whi-whi-whi-whee?. They have a loud song consisting of several rapid whistling notes. They feed on mainly on insects and sometimes berries by gleaning mostly along branches and leaves within trees but sometimes also make aerial sallies or descend to the ground. They have a habit of adjusting their wings, raising them over the tail shortly after alighting on a perch. They nest in summer before the rainy season, building a cup nest on a bare fork. The nest is made of fibres and bark held by cobwebs and covered with bits of bark and lichen. It is lined with silky plant fibres. Three eggs are the usual clutch. Both parents incubate but it is thought that only the female feeds the young. Young birds are fed on insects and berries. Two broods may be raised in some years.

A species of Haemoproteus was described from a Goan specimen of this species as Haemoproteus tephrodornis by Froilano de Mello in 1935. A spirurid nematode Oxyspirura alii was described and named after S. Mehdi Ali and obtained from within the eye cavity of a common woodshrike specimen from Hyderabad. Ticks of the species Haemaphysalis bispinosa and H. intermedia have been recorded on the species.
