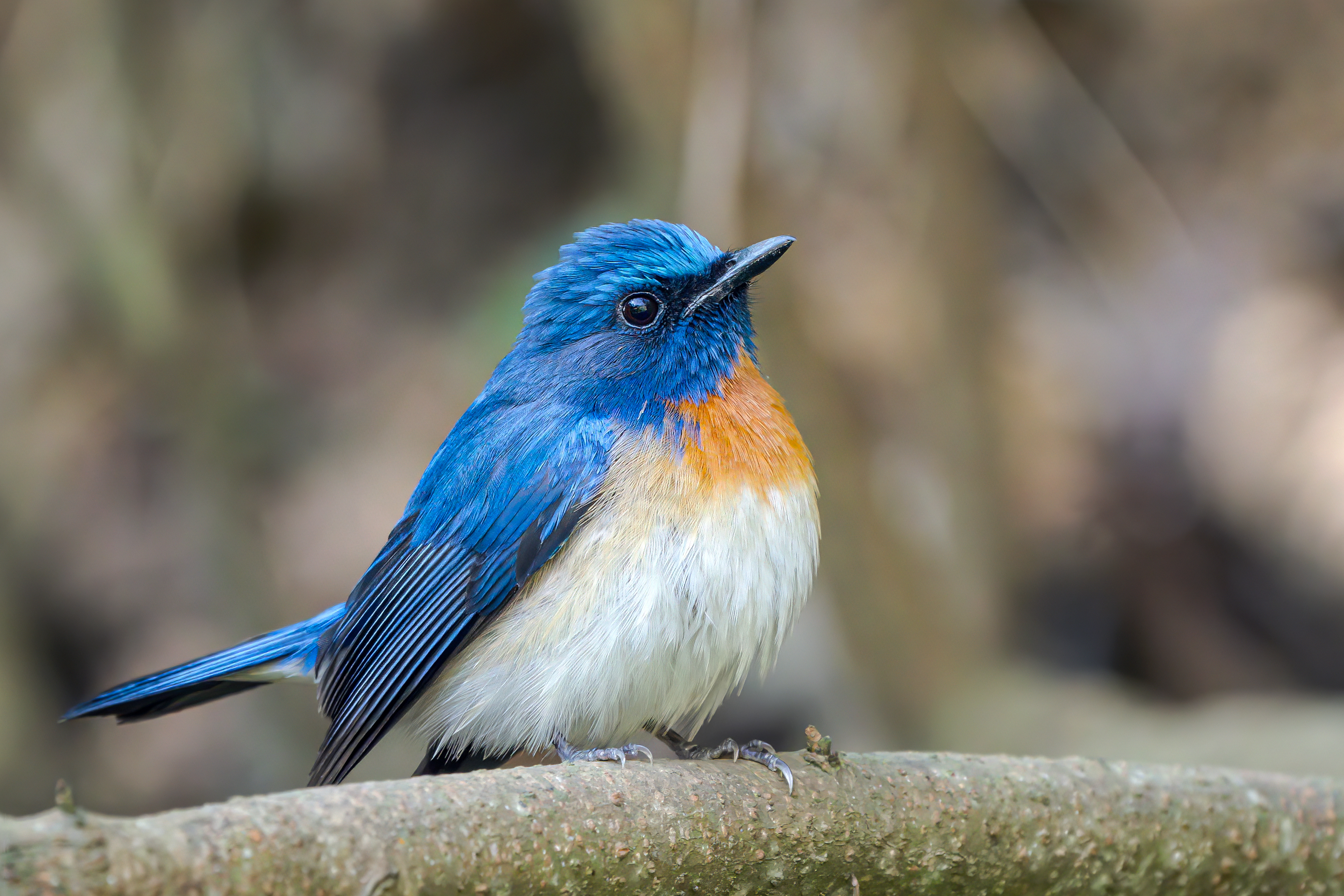
- Ranibari forest, Kathmandu Valley, Nepal

Conservation status
- Least Concern (IUCN 3.1)

Scientific classification
- Kingdom: Animalia
- Phylum: Chordata
- Class: Aves
- Order: Passeriformes
- Family: Muscicapidae
- Genus: Cyornis
- Species: C. rubeculoides

Binomial name
- Cyornis rubeculoides (Vigors, 1831)

= Blue-throated blue flycatcher =

Species of bird

The blue-throated blue flycatcher (Cyornis rubeculoides) is a small passerine bird in the flycatcher family, Muscicapidae. It resembles Cyornis tickelliae but easily separated by the blue throat. The habitat of this species is a thicker forest than other species of flycatchers. The blue-throated flycatcher is found in much of the Indian subcontinent, all through the Himalayas, the plains and Western Ghats of India in the cold months, and also extends eastwards into Bangladesh, and to Arakan and the Tenasserim Hills in Myanmar.

== Description ==
Adult males have blue throats and orange breasts with a well defined white belly and flanks. Females have an olive head and upperparts with a poorly defined creamy-orange chest and a white belly.

== Gallery ==
Blue-throated blue flycatcher, Cyornis rubeculoides - Kaeng Krachan National Park

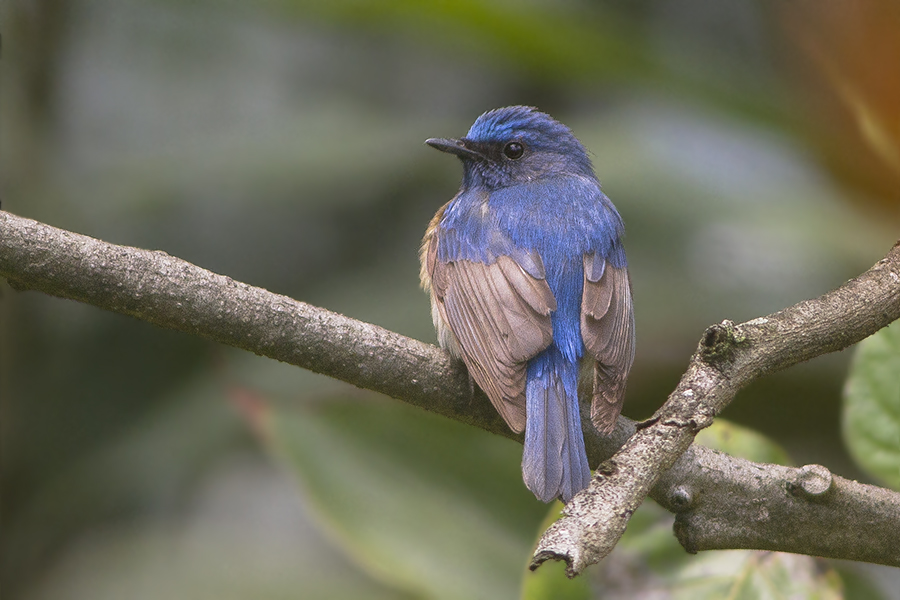
C. r. rubeculoides from Khangchendzonga National Park, West Sikkim, India.
