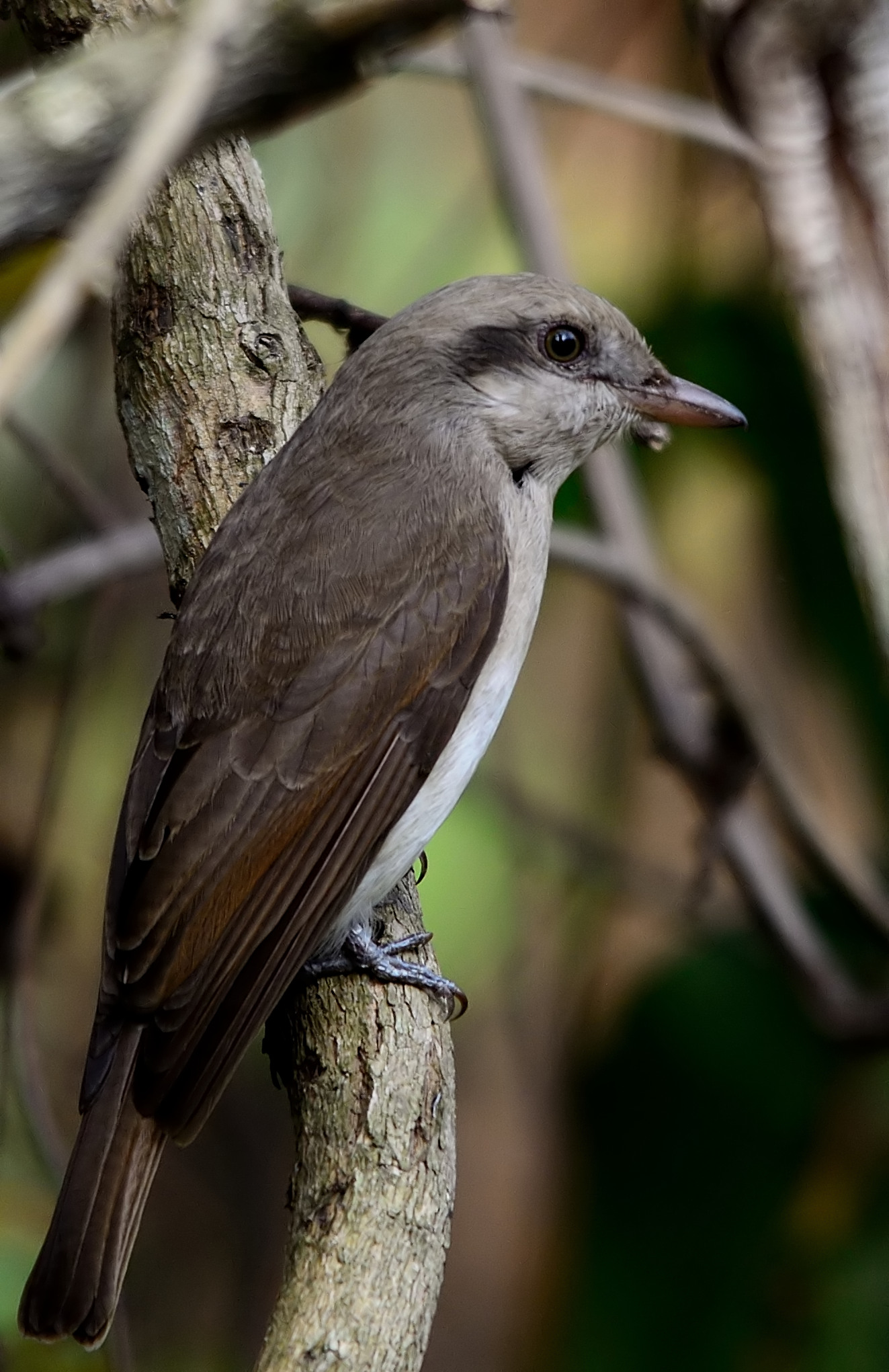
- At Manas National Park in Assam, India.
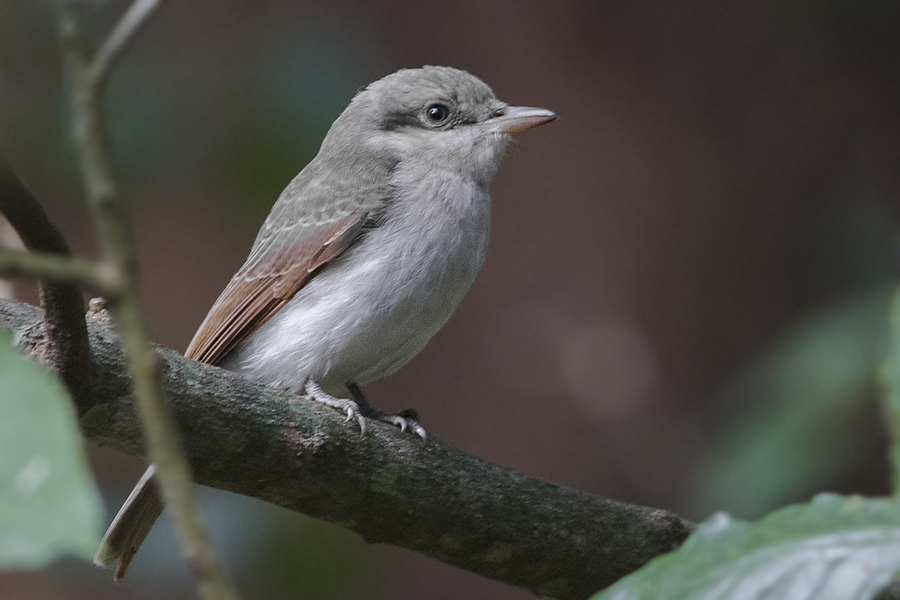
- At Ramnagar, Uttarakhand, India.

Conservation status
- Least Concern (IUCN 3.1)

Scientific classification
- Kingdom: Animalia
- Phylum: Chordata
- Class: Aves
- Order: Passeriformes
- Family: Vangidae
- Genus: Tephrodornis
- Species: T. virgatus

Binomial name
- Tephrodornis virgatus (Temminck, 1824)

Synonyms
- Tephrodornis gularis (Raffles, 1822)

= Large woodshrike =

Species of bird

The large woodshrike (Tephrodornis virgatus) is found in south-eastern Asia, Sumatra, Java, and Borneo. Its natural habitats are temperate forest, subtropical or tropical moist lowland forest, subtropical or tropical mangrove forest, and subtropical or tropical moist montane forest.

== Taxonomy ==
It is usually placed in the family Vangidae. The Malabar woodshrike is sometimes considered conspecific with the large woodshrike.

=== Subspecies ===
Ten subspecies are recognised:

- T. v. pelvicus (Hodgson, 1837) – east Himalayas to north Myanmar
- T. v. jugans Deignan, 1948 – east Myanmar, south China and north Thailand
- T. v. verneyi Kinnear, 1924 – southeast Myanmar, southwest Thailand and north Malay Peninsula
- T. v. annectens Robinson & Kloss, 1918 – central Malay Peninsula
- T. v. fretensis Robinson & Kloss, 1920 – south Malay Peninsula and north Sumatra
- T. v. virgatus (Temminck, 1824) – south Sumatra, Java and Bali
- T. v. frenatus Büttikofer, 1887 – Borneo
- T. v. mekongensis Meyer de Schauensee, 1946 – southeast Thailand to south Vietnam
- T. v. hainanus Ogilvie-Grant, 1910 – north Laos, north Vietnam and Hainan (off southeast China)
- T. v. latouchei Kinnear, 1925 – south China
