= Akiva (given name) =

Akiva or Akiba is a Jewish-ethnic name, arising in Aramaic from Hebrew: יַעֲקֹב, and thus cognate to English Jacob.

Among Jews, "Ya'akov" and "Akiva" – though essentially variants of the same name – are treated as completely separate, arousing different historical and religious associations: the one recalls the Biblical Patriarch Jacob, the other relates to the Roman period Rabbi Akiva.

== Akiva ==
- Rabbi Akiva (c. 50 – c. 135 AD), Judean religious leader
- Akiva Ehrenfeld (1923–2012), president of Kiryat Mattersdorf, Jerusalem
- Akiva Eiger (1761–1837), Polish Talmudic scholar and rabbi
- Akiva Eldar (born 1945), Israeli journalist and author
- Akiva Frankfurt (died 1597), German poet and rabbi
- Akiva Goldsman (born 1962), American writer
- Akiva Govrin (1902–1980), Israeli politician
- Akiva Grunblatt (fl. 2000s), American religious leader
- Akiva ha-Kohen (died 1496), Hungarian scholar and rabbi
- Akiva Baer ben Joseph (died 1724), Viennese Talmudist and kabbalistic writer
- Akiva Librecht (1876–1958), Israeli politician
- Akiva Nof (born 1936), Israeli politician & songwriter
- Akiva Orr (born 1931), Israeli writer & political activist
- Akiva Schaffer (born 1977), American writer & comedian
- Akiva Yosef Schlesinger (1838–1922), Hungarian Orthodox Jewish rabbi
- Akiva Tatz (fl. c. 2000), a South African religious leader & writer
- Akiva Tor, Israeli diplomat and politician
- Akiva (singer) (born 1991), Israeli singer
- Akiva Aryeh Weiss (1868–1947), Zionist activist, architect, and city planner
- Akiva Vroman (1912–1989), Israeli geologist
- Akiva Weingarten (born 1984), German-American liberal rabbi
- Akiva Yaglom (1921–2007), Soviet & Russian scientist

== Akiba ==
- Akiba Eisenberg (1908–1983), Hungarian rabbi
- Akiba Lehren (1795–1876), Dutch banker
- Akiba ben Judah Loeb (18th century), German rabbi
- Akiba Rubinstein (1882–1961), Polish-Jewish chess Grandmaster

== Fictional characters ==
- Akiva Shtisel, main character in the television series Shtisel
- Akiva, a seraph and main character on the American fantasy novel Daughter of Smoke and Bone
