= Akiba =

Akiba may refer to:

== People ==
- Akiba (given name)
- Akiba (surname)

== Schools ==
- Akiba Hebrew Academy, now Jack M. Barrack Hebrew Academy, in Bryn Mawr, Pennsylvania, U.S.
- Akiba Yavneh Academy, in Dallas, Texas, U.S.
- Akiba-Schechter Jewish Day School, in Hyde Park, Chicago

== Other uses ==
- Akiba (Metal Gear), or Johnny Sasaki, a character in the Metal Gear Solid video games
- Akiba (subgenus), a protozoan subgenus containing the species Leucocytozoon caulleryi
- Akiba Commercial Bank, Tanzania
- Akiba Dam, Shizuoka Prefecture, Japan
- Akihabara (often shortened to Akiba), a shopping district in Tokyo, Japan

== See also ==
- Akiva (disambiguation)
