= Blue vanga =

Blue vanga may refer to:

- Madagascar blue vanga, Cyanolanius madagascarinus
- Comoros blue vanga, Cyanolanius comorensis
