= Akiva (disambiguation) =

Akiva was the Judean religious leader Rabbi Akiva (c. 50 – c. 135 CE).

Akiva also may refer to:

- Akiva (given name)
- Yeshivat Akiva, religious school
- Akiva, a planet in the Star Wars franchise
- Akiva, a resistance organization involved in the Warsaw Ghetto Uprising and in the Krakow Ghetto
- Akiva (singer), an Israeli singer

== See also ==
- Akiba (disambiguation)
