= Tatz =

Tatz is a surname. Notable people with the surname include:

- Akiva Tatz, South African Orthodox rabbi, inspirational speaker, and writer
- Colin Tatz (1934–2019), Professor of Politics
- Tino Tatz

== See also ==
- Katz (surname)
