= Monte Lozzo =

Mountain in Italy

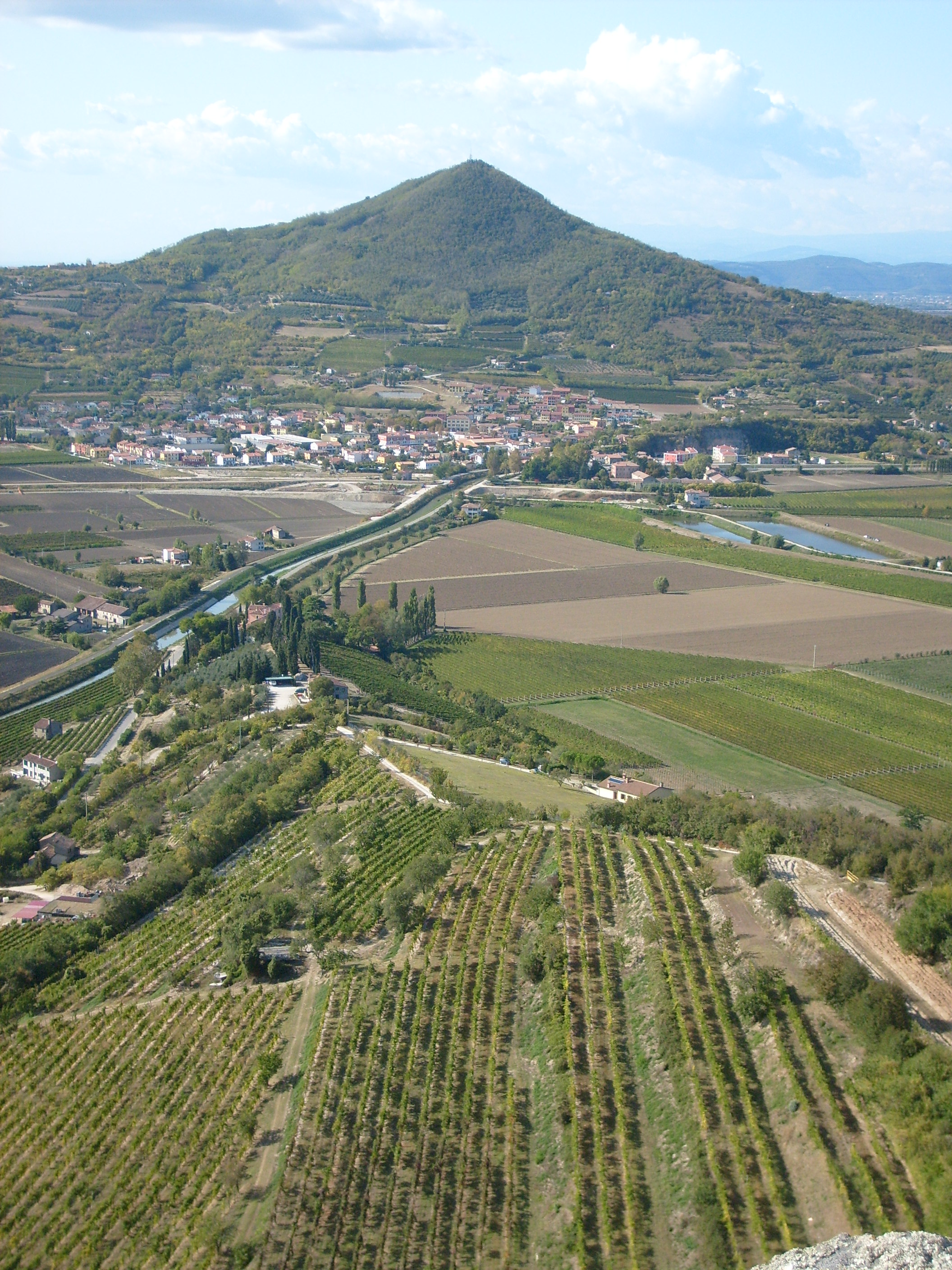

Highest point
- Elevation: 324 m (1,063 ft)
- Coordinates: 45°17′45″N 11°37′19″E

Geography
- Location within Italy
- Location: Veneto, Italy

Monte Lozzo is a mountain of the Veneto, Italy. It has an elevation of 324 metres (1,063 ft). It is also a minor tourist attraction.

== Protection Status ==
Monte Lozzo has been is covered by the European Union's Natura 2000 Project. It is a Special Protection Area (SPA) for 45 species, which include 33 species of birds such as the Eurasian sparrowhawk and the Nightjar.
