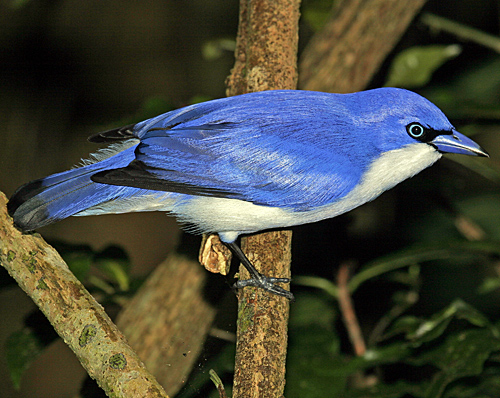
- Madagascar blue vanga Cyanolanius madagascarinus

Scientific classification
- Kingdom: Animalia
- Phylum: Chordata
- Class: Aves
- Order: Passeriformes
- Family: Vangidae
- Genus: Cyanolanius; Bonaparte, 1854

Type species
- Lanius bicolor Bonaparte, 1854

= Cyanolanius =

Genus of birds

Cyanolanius is a bird genus placed in the Vangidae.

There are two species:

Image	Common name	Scientific name	Distribution
	Madagascar blue vanga	Cyanolanius madagascarinus	Northern, eastern, and western Madagascar.
	Comoros blue vanga	Cyanolanius comorensis	Grande Comore and Mohéli in the Comoros Islands.
