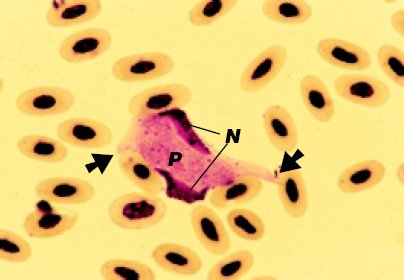
- Leucocytozoon smithi in a stained blood smear from a turkey

Scientific classification
- Domain: Eukaryota
- Supergroup: Alveolata
- Phylum: Apicomplexa
- Class: Aconoidasida
- Order: Haemosporida
- Family: Leucocytozoidae
- Genus: Leucocytozoon

Species
- Leucocytozoon acridotheris Leucocytozoon alcedinis Leucocytozoon alcedis Leucocytozoon anatis Leucocytozoon andrewsi Leucocytozoon anellobiae Leucocytozoon apiaster Leucocytozoon ardeolae Leucocytozoon artamidis Leucocytozoon anseris Leucocytozoon atkinsoni Leucocytozoon balmorali Leucocytozoon beaurepairei Leucocytozoon bennetti Leucocytozoon berestneffi Leucocytozoon bishopae Leucocytozoon bishopi Leucocytozoon bisi Leucocytozoon bonasae Leucocytozoon bouffardi Leucocytozoon brimonti Leucocytozoon bucerotis Leucocytozoon cambournaci Leucocytozoon capitonis Leucocytozoon caprimulgi Leucocytozoon caulleryi Leucocytozoon centropi Leucocytozoon chloropsidis Leucocytozoon coccyzus Leucocytozoon colius Leucocytozoon communis Leucocytozoon coracinae Leucocytozoon costai Leucocytozoon dacelo Leucocytozoon danilewskyi Ziemann 1898; Leucocytozoon deswardti Leucocytozoon dinizi Leucocytozoon dubreuili Mathis & Leger 1911; Leucocytozoon dutoiti Leucocytozoon enriquesi Leucocytozoon eurystomi Leucocytozoon francae Leucocytozoon francolini Leucocytozoon frascai Leucocytozoon fringillinarum Woodcock 1910; Leucocytozoon galli Leucocytozoon gallinarum Leucocytozoon gentili Leucocytozoon giovannolai Leucocytozoon grallariae Leucocytozoon greineri Leucocytozoon grusi Leucocytozoon hamiltoni Leucocytozoon huchzermeyeri Leucocytozoon ibisi Leucocytozoon icteris Leucocytozoon iowense Leucocytozoon irenae Leucocytozoon jakamowi Leucocytozoon kerandeli Leucocytozoon lairdi Leucocytozoon lanium Leucocytozoon laverani Leucocytozoon leboeufi Leucocytozoon leitaoi Leucocytozoon liothricis Leucocytozoon lovati Leucocytozoon maccluri Leucocytozoon macleani Leucocytozoon major Leucocytozoon majoris Laveran 1902; Leucocytozoon mansoni Leucocytozoon marchouxi Leucocytozoon martini Leucocytozoon mathisi Leucocytozoon mcclurei Leucocytozoon melloi Leucocytozoon mesnili Leucocytozoon molpastis Leucocytozoon muscicapa Leucocytozoon mutus Leucocytozoon neavei Leucocytozoon nectariniae Leucocytozoon neotropicalis Leucocytozoon numidae Leucocytozoon oriolis Leucocytozoon otidis Leucocytozoon pittae Leucocytozoon pogoniuli Leucocytozoon pycnonoti Leucocytozoon rimondi Leucocytozoon roubaudi Leucocytozoon sabrezi Leucocytozoon sakharoffi Leucocytozoon schoutedeni Leucocytozoon schuffneri Leucocytozoon simondi Leucocytozoon smithi Leucocytozoon squamatus Leucocytozoon struthionis Leucocytozoon sturni Leucocytozoon sunibdu Leucocytozoon tawaki Leucocytozoon timaliae Leucocytozoon toddi Sambon 1908; Leucocytozoon trachyphoni Leucocytozoon whitworthi Leucocytozoon ziemanni Leucocytozoon zosteropis

= Leucocytozoon =

Genus of protists

Leucocytozoon (or Leukocytozoon) is a genus of parasitic alveolates belonging to the phylum Apicomplexa (which also includes the malaria parasites).

The species of this genus use either blackflies (Simulium species) or a biting midge as their definitive host and birds as their intermediate host. There are over 100 species in this genus. Over 100 species of birds have been recorded as hosts to these parasites.

== Life cycle ==
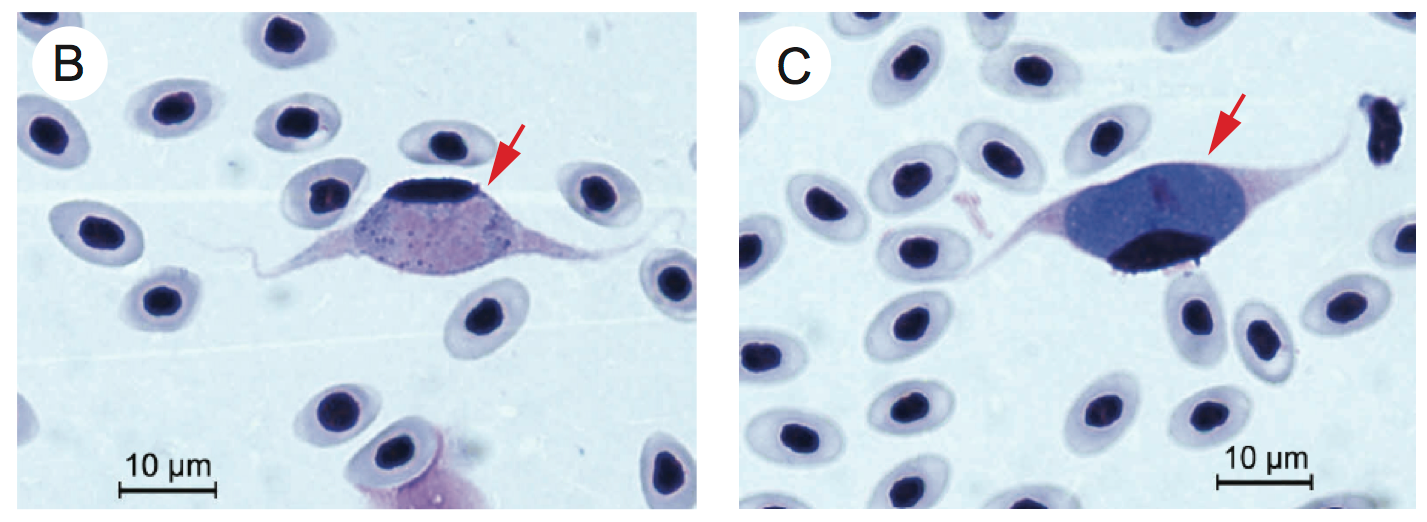
Blood from a chicken infected with a male gametocyte (left) and a female gametocyte (right).

Parasites in the genus Leucocytozoon have a life cycle that involves both a bird host, and a black fly (with the exception of Leucocytozoon caulleryi which cycles between a bird host and a biting midge). Parasites enter the bird host in a form called a sporozoite through the bite of the blood-sucking black fly. The sporozoites invade host cells in the liver where they undergo asexual replication, forming numerous daughter cells called merozoites within 4–5 days. The duration of this stage depends in part upon the species. In some species this stage may occur in the endothelial cells instead of the liver.

The newly released merozoites infect either erythrocytes, leukocytes, macrophages or endothelial cells. Those infecting the macrophages or endothelial cells develop into megaloschizonts. The megaloschizonts divide into primary cytomeres, which in turn multiply into smaller cytomeres, which mature into schizonts, which in turn divide into merozoites. In erythrocytes or leukocytes, merozoites develop into gametocytes.

The gametocytes are taken up by a blood-sucking fly as it bites the bird host. Gametocytes then mature in the insect midgut into macrogametocytes (female) with red-staining nuclei and microgametocytes (male) with pale-staining diffuse nuclei: these fuse to form an ookinete. The male gametocytes normally give rise to eight microgametes. The ookinete penetrates an intestinal cell of the fly and matures into an oocyst. After several days the oocyst produces ~100 sporozoites that leave and migrate to the salivary glands of the fly.

== Description ==
The nuclei of the schizonts is enclosed in a trilaminar membrane with peripherally arranged chromatin. The schizonts also contain numerous cytomers also with trilaminar membranes and containing multiple ribosomes. Repeated invagination of the cytomeres gives rise to the merozoites which also have a trilaminar membrane.

The merozoites have rhoptries, micronemes and three apical rings. The mitochondrion contains vesicular cristae. There may be one or two paranuclear bodies in some species. Their function is unknown.

Two gametocyte forms are recognised: an elongated (sail-like) form and a compact spherical form. These are usually 12–14 micrometres long. The large gametocytes tend to grossly distort the infected cells and make cell identification difficult. A pseudopigment known as volutin may be present.

== Evolution ==
It has been suggested that this genus arose after the two others genera Plasmodium and Haemoproteus, the latter originating from the late Oligocene or early Eocene at about the same time as Piciformes and Coraciiformes.

== Taxonomy ==
The genus is divided into two subgenera—Akiba and Leucocytozoon—based on the vector species.

The only known member of the subgenus Akiba is Leucocytozoon (Akiba) caulleryi which uses members of the genus Culicoides as its vectors.

The remaining species in the genus use members of the genus Simulium as their vectors.

In 1977, Greiner and Kocan in an extensive examination of species in the order Falconiformes declared that the only valid species infecting this order was L. toddi.

L. dubreuili is considered to be restricted to the family Turdidae; L. fringillinarum is considered to be restricted to several passiform families; and L. majoris is considered restricted to the family Paridae.

L. ziemanni infects owls.

== Diagnostic criteria ==
Form gamonts in white blood cells and/or erythrocytes. Gametocytes cause marked enlargement and distortion of the infected cell producing a football-like appearance.

No merogony occurs in either leucocytes or erythrocytes.

Merogony occurs in the parenchyma of liver, heart, kidney, or other organs. Meronts may form large bodies divided into cytomeres.

Hemozoin deposits (pigment) are not formed—a useful distinguishing feature for Leucocytozoon from Haemoproteus and Plasmodium.

Oocysts develop rapidly in 3–5 days. The oocysts are small and nonexpanding, reaching 13 micrometres in diameter and typically have less than 100 short, thick sporozoites.

The vectors are Simulium or Culicoides species.

The vertebrate hosts are birds.

Type species: Leucocytozoon ziemanni

== Pathology ==
The typical pathology of infection with these parasites includes anaemia and enlargement of the liver and spleen. Gross lesions also include pulmonary congestion and pericardial effusion.

Megaloschizonts appear as grey-white nodules found in the heart, liver, lung or spleen. Microscopically there is ischemic necrosis and associated inflammation in the heart, brain, spleen and liver due to occlusion of blood vessels by megaloschizonts in endothelial cells. Ruptured schizonts may induce granulomatous reactions in the surrounding tissues.

Clinically the majority of birds affected with leucocytozoonosis exhibit no signs. Among those that do the signs include mild to severe signs of anorexia, ataxia, weakness, anemia, emaciation and difficulty breathing.

The excess mortality due to Leucocytozoon in adult birds seems to occur as a result of debilitation and increased susceptibility to secondary infection.

== Epidemiology ==
L. simondi is suspected to be a major parasite of Canada geese in some areas, including the upper Midwestern United States and Canada. L. smithi affects turkey farms in the southeastern United States.

== Host range ==
Bird hosts

- L. anatis—ducks
- L. andrewsi—chicken (Gallus gallus domesticus)
- L. anseris—geese
- L. artamidis—wood-swallows (Artamidae species)
- L. atkinsoni—common jery (Neomixis tenella)
- L. balmorali—shrikes (Laniidae species), bushshrikes (Malaconotidae species)
- L. bennetti—hook-billed vanga (Vanga curvirostris)
- L. berestneffi—yellow-billed magpie (Pica nuttalia)
- L. bishopi—parrotbills (Paradoxornithidae species)
- L. bonasae—ruffed grouse (Bonasa umbellus), spruce grouse (Canachites canadensis), ptarmigan
- L. bouffardi—weaver birds (Ploceidae species)
- L. brimonti—bulbuls (Pycnonotus species)
- L. caprimulgi—nightjars (Caprimulgidae species)
- L. caulleryi Mathis and Leger 1909—chicken (Gallus gallus domesticus)
- L. coracinae—swifts (Apodidaeavian species), cuckoo-shrikes (Campephagidae)
- L. danilewskyi—owl (Strix occidentalis)
- L. deswardti—Sugarbirds (Promeropidae species)
- L. dubreuili—American robin (Turdus migratorius)
- L. dutoiti—finches (Fringillidae species)
- L. frascai—rufous-headed ground-roller (Atelornis crossleyi)
- L. fringillinarum—finches (Fringilla coelebs), dark-eyed Juncos (Junco hyemalis), white winged crossbills (Loxia leucoptera), yellow wagtail (Motacilla flava), house sparrow (Passer domesticus biblicus)
- L. gentili—house sparrow (Passer domesticus)
- L. greineri—common sunbird asity (Neodrepanis coruscans), velvet asity (Philepitta castanea)
- L. grusi— sandhill crane (Antigone canadensis)
- L. hamiltoni—Bukharan great tit (Parus bokharensis)
- L. lairdi—blue vanga (Cyanolanius madagascarinus)
- L. liothricis—Old World babblers (Timaliidae species)
- L. lovati—greater sage-grouse (Centrocercus urophasianus), blue grouse (Dendragapus obscurus), willow ptarmigan (Lagopus lagopus), wild rock ptarmigan (Lagopus mutus)
- L. maccluri—Thailand thrush (Zoothera marginata)
- L. macleani Sambon 1908—chickens (Gallus gallus domesticus)
- L. majoris—yellow wagtails (Motacilla flava)
- L. marchouxi—Mauritian pink pigeon (Columba mayeri), doves
- L. nectariniae—sunbird (Nectarinia olivacea)
- L. neavei—guinea fowl
- L. pogoniuli—tinker barbets (Pogoniulus atroflavus, Pogoniulus subsulphureus)
- L. pycnonoti—bulbuls (Pycnonotidae species)
- L. roubaudi—estrildid finches (Estrildidae species)
- L. sabrazesi Mathis and Léger 1910—chicken (Gallus gallus domesticus)
- L. schoutedeni Rodhain, Pons, Vandenbranden and Bequaert 1913—chicken (Gallus gallus domesticus)
- L. schufneri Prowazek 1912- chicken (Gallus gallus domesticus)
- L. shaartusicum—redstart (Phoenicurus phoenicurus)
- L. simondii—ring-necked ducks (Aythya collaris), wood duck (Aix sponsa), white Pekin duck (Anas bochas), Mexican duck (Anas diazi), mallard duck (Anas platyrhynchos), black duck (Anas rubripes), geese (Branta canadensis), Emperor Goose (Chen canagica), mergansers (Mergus merganser), trumpeter swans (Olor buccinator), eider duck (Somateria mollissima)
- L. smithi—turkeys (Meleagris species)
- L. sturni—starlings (Sturnidae species)
- L. tawaki—penguins (Spheniscidae species)
- L. timaliae—Old World babblers (Timaliidae species)
- L. toddi—Coopers hawk (Accipiter cooperii), sharp-shinned hawks (Accipiter striatus), Eurasian buzzard (Buteo buteo), Red-shouldered hawks (Buteo lineatus), white-tailed sea eagle (Haliaeetus albicilla), bald eagles (Haliaeetus leucocephalus), Chimango Caracara (Milvago chimango), grouse
- L. trachyphoni—barbet (Trachyphonus purpureus)
- L. ziemanni—eagle owl (Bubo bubo), great horned owls (Bubo virginianus), snowy owls (Nyctea scandiaca), spotted owls (Strix occidentalis)
- L. zosteropis—white-eyes (Zosteropidae species)

== Vectors ==
- L. bonasae—Simulium aureum, Simulium latipes
- L. caulleryi—Culicoides arakawae
- L. lovati—Prosimulium hirtipes, Simulium japonicum, Simulium uchidai
- L. simondi—Cnephia ornithophilia, Simulium rugglesi
- L. smithi—Simulium nigritarse
- L. tawaki—Austrosimulium ungulatum

== Notes ==
Like many protist species and genera this genus is subject to ongoing revision especially in the light of DNA based taxonomy. Described species may be subject to revision.

- L. anatis and L. anseris are considered to be synonyms of L. simondi.
- L. andrewsi and L. schoutedeni are considered to be synonyms.
- L. bonasae, L. jakamowi and L. mansoni are considered to be synonyms of L. lovati.
- L. brimonti is considered to be a synonym of L. fringillinarum.
- L. costai and L. numidae are considered to be synonyms of L. neavei.
- L. francolini, L. kerandeli, L. martini, L. mesnili, L. sabrazesi and L. schuffneri are considered to be synonyms of L. macleani.
- The species L. galli is open to some doubt.
- L. molpastis is considered to be a synonym of L. brimonti
- L. monardi is considered to be a synonym of L. gentili
- L. toddi seems likely to be a cryptic species complex.
- L. turtur and its subspecies L. turtur orientalis are considered a synonym of L. marchouxi

== History ==
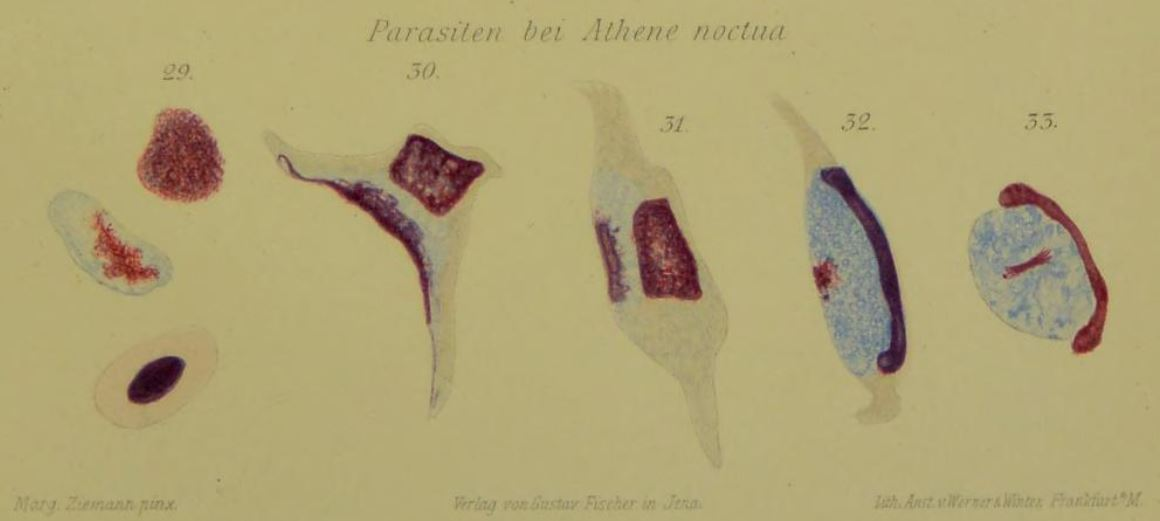
Drawing of owl blood cells parasitized by Leukocytozoen danilewskyi by Hans Ziemann in 1898

The first described observation of a Leucocytozoon parasite may have been by Vasily Danilewsky, who described certain parasites he observed in the blood of birds as "Leucocytozaire" in 1888 (as they appeared to infect leukocytes). A more detailed description of parasites resembling Leucocytozoon was published in 1894 by N. Sakharoff from the blood of birds near Tbilisi. Soon thereafter in 1898, Hans Ziemann described a Leucocytozoon parasite from the blood of the owl Athene noctua, naming it Leukocytozoen danilewskyi in honor of Danilewsky. N. M. Berestneff was the first to use the current genus name Leucocytozoon while describing parasites he called Leucocytozoon danilewskyi from several common birds. The genus was subsequently formally defined in 1908 by Louis Sambon, and has remained largely unchanged since. In 1930 and 1931, Earl O'Roke and Louis V. Skidmore independently discovered black flies to be the vector of Leucocytozoon species.
