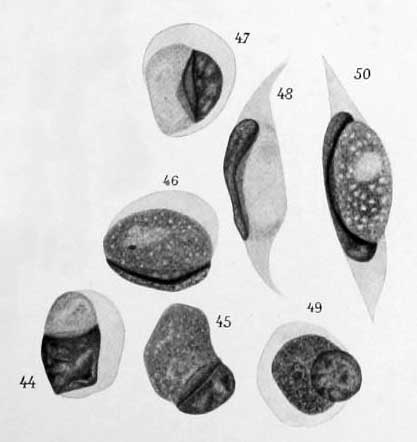
- Leucocytozoon caprimulgi in Caprimulgus fossii

Scientific classification
- Domain: Eukaryota
- Clade: Diaphoretickes
- Clade: SAR
- Clade: Alveolata
- Phylum: Apicomplexa
- Class: Aconoidasida
- Order: Haemosporida
- Family: Leucocytozoidae
- Genus: Leucocytozoon
- Species: L. caprimulgi

Binomial name
- Leucocytozoon caprimulgi Kerandel, 1913

= Leucocytozoon caprimulgi =

Species of single-celled organism

Leucocytozoon caprimulgi is a species of the genus Leucocytozoon, a genus of parasitic alveolates. It is a rare parasite of the European nightjar. Its scarcity and the fact that it is the only one of its genus found in nightjars support the suggestion that it has crossed over from close relatives that normally infect owls.
