= Leucocytozoon caulleryi =

Scientific classification
- Domain: Eukaryota
- Clade: Sar
- Clade: Alveolata
- Phylum: Apicomplexa
- Class: Aconoidasida
- Order: Haemosporida
- Family: Leucocytozoidae
- Genus: Leucocytozoon
- Species: L. caulleryi

Binomial name
- Leucocytozoon caulleryi Mathis & Leger, 1909

Species of single-celled organism

Leucocytozoon caulleryi is a species of the genus Leucocytozoon, a genus of parasitic alveolates.

This species has both insect (Culicoides species) and vertebrate (birds) hosts.

== Description ==
=== History ===
This species was originally described by Mathis and Leger in 1909. The species was also described by Akiba in Japan in 1958.

A second species - Leucocytozoon schufneri - was described by Prowazek in 1912 also in the chicken. This is now considered to be a synonym.

This species has been classified into the subgenus Akiba because of its vector: other species in the genus are transmitted by species of the genus Simulium.

=== Life cycle ===
The parasite is transmitted by the bite of its vector. On infection of a vertebrate host, the parasites enter the blood stream and spread through the body. They invade the endothelial cells in a number of organs. These grow into multinucleated masses - megaloschizonts. This first round of schizonts give rise to the first generation of merozoites. This first generation of merozoites invade new endothelial cells and give rise to a second generation of schizonts. After a number of cell divisions these in turn give rise to the second generation of merozoites which in their turn infect erythrocytes and leukocytes.

Within the erythrocytes or leukocytes, the merozoites develop into gametocytes. Once ingested by a vector male and female gametocytes fuse and give rise to a zygote. The zygote invades the body of the vector, undergoes a series of cell divisions resulting in motile sporozoites that invade the salivary glands of the vector.

Early schizonts are spherical or ovoid and 30-35 micrometers (μm) in diameter.

Gametocytes are round and measure 15.0 to 15.5 μm in diameter.

== Geographic distribution ==
This species is found in Japan, Kazakhstan, Malaysia, the Philippines, Singapore, Taiwan, and Thailand.

== Clinical features and host pathology ==
This species infects chickens (Gallus gallus domesticus), guinea fowl and pheasants.

After infection schizongony occurs in the adrenals, brain, intestine, kidneys, liver, muscles, ovaries, pancreas, spleen, thymus and trachea.

Typical pathology includes the presence of the schizonts and the surrounding granulomata, haemorrhages, oedema and pressure atrophy in the oviducts.

Infected chickens are anaemic, have pale combs and diarrhoea. Egg production may be reduced and the egg shells may be softer than normal.

Chickens who survive the infection appear to be resistant to re infection.

A vaccine based on a recombinant protein is available.

This disease is also known as Bangkok haemorrhagic disease.

== Vectors ==
Known vectors of this parasite include Culicoides arakawae Arakawa 1910.

== Diagnosis ==
Blood smears can be performed to identify the parasite in the red blood cells. ELISA testing can be used for antigen or antibody testing.

== Treatment and prevention ==
Treatment is usually ineffective.

In-feed pyrimethamine and sulfadimethoxine can help prevent the disease. Prevention is by control of the infecting vectors but is often difficult to implement.
