= Cytomere =

Cytomeres are structures that are formed when the contents of a single large schizont are separated into multiple daughter cells, in the course of schizogony.

Cytomeres are caused by complex invaginations of the surface of the schizont. They complete the budding process in the formation of large numbers of merozoites and are found in some species of sporozoans—including those of the genus Leucocytozoon—undergoing exoerythrocytic asexual division.
