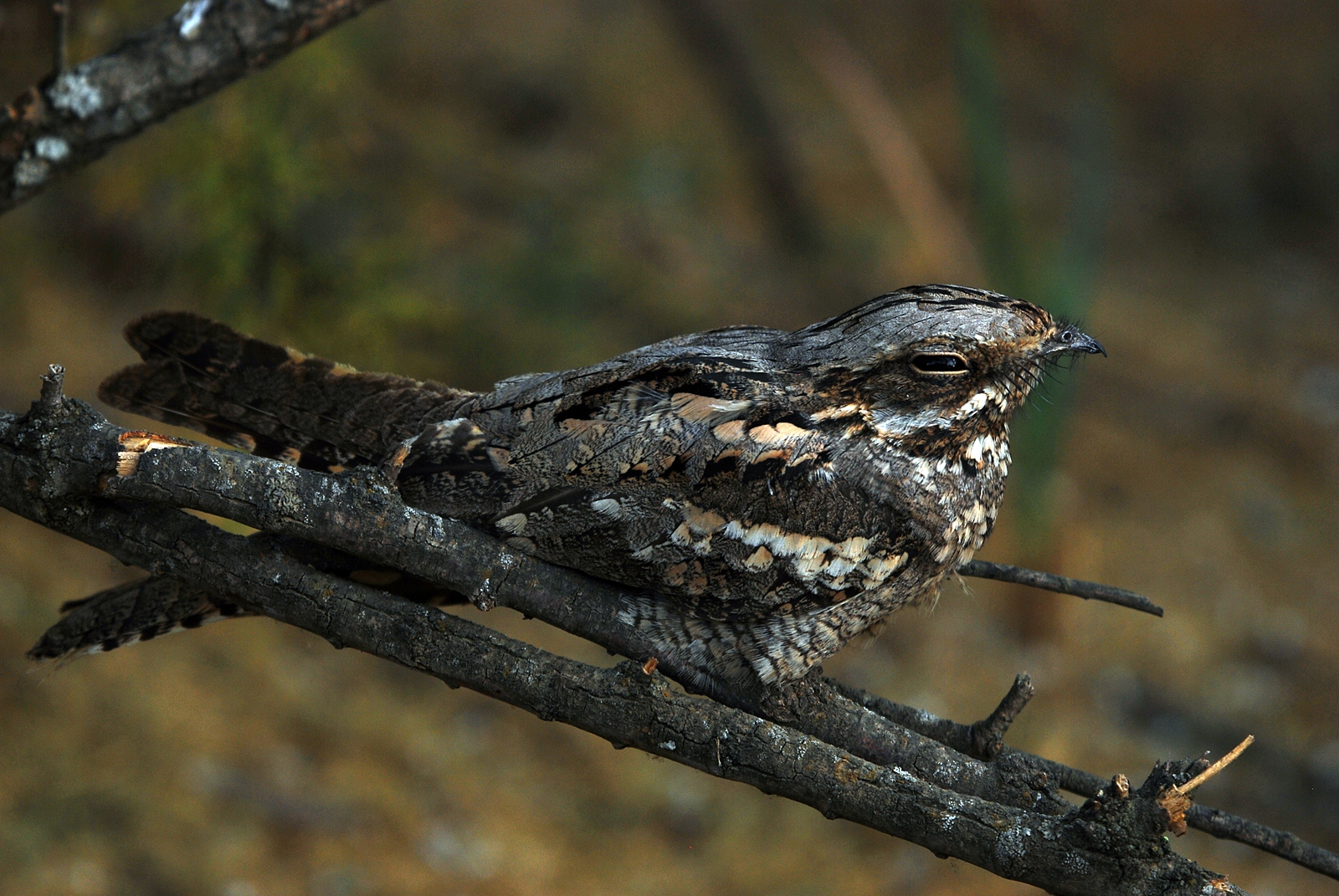

Conservation status
- Least Concern (IUCN 3.1)

Scientific classification
- Kingdom: Animalia
- Phylum: Chordata
- Class: Aves
- Order: Caprimulgiformes
- Family: Caprimulgidae
- Genus: Caprimulgus
- Species: C. europaeus

Binomial name
- Caprimulgus europaeus Linnaeus, 1758
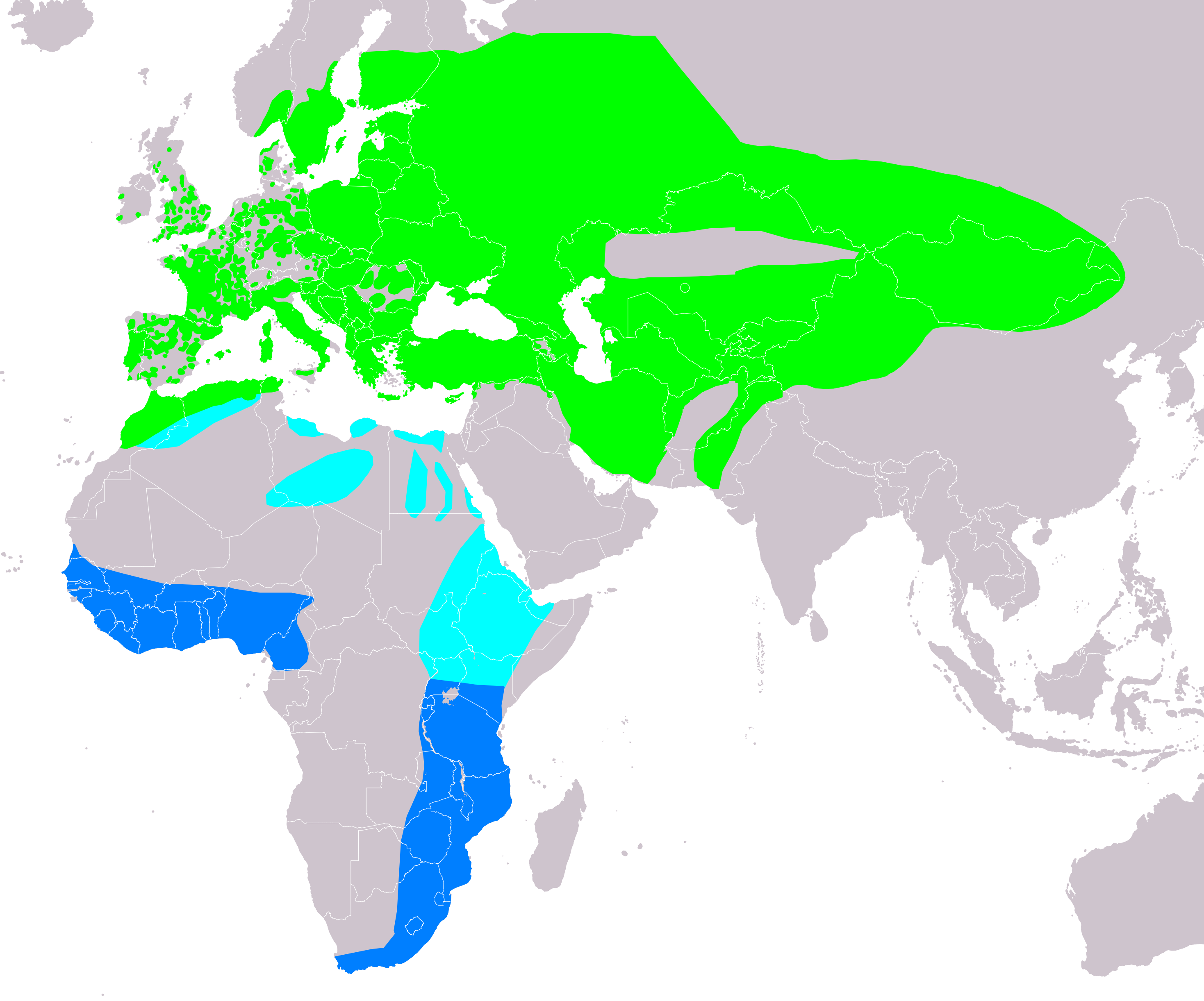
- Range of C. europaeus Breeding Passage Non-breeding

Synonyms
- C. centralasicus

Audio
- Calls of a male bird, Surrey, England

= European nightjar =

Migratory bird found in Eurasia and Africa

The European nightjar (Caprimulgus europaeus), common goatsucker, Eurasian nightjar or just nightjar is a crepuscular and nocturnal bird in the nightjar family that breeds across most of Europe and the Palearctic to Mongolia and Northwestern China. The Latin generic name refers to the old myth that the nocturnal nightjar suckled from goats, causing them to cease to give milk. The six subspecies differ clinally, the birds becoming smaller and paler towards the east of the range. All populations are migratory, wintering in sub-Saharan Africa. Their densely patterned grey and brown plumage makes individuals difficult to see in the daytime when they rest on the ground or perch motionless along a branch, although the male shows white patches in the wings and tail as he flies at night.

The preferred habitat is dry, open country with some trees and small bushes, such as heaths, forest clearings or newly planted woodland. The male European nightjar occupies a territory in spring and advertises his presence with a distinctive sustained churring trill from a perch. He patrols his territory with wings held in a V and tail fanned, chasing intruders while wing-clapping and calling. Wing clapping also occurs when the male chases the female in a spiralling display flight. The European nightjar does not build a nest, and its two grey and brown blotched eggs are laid directly on the ground; they hatch after about 17–21 days and the downy chicks fledge in another 16–17 days.

The European nightjar feeds on a wide variety of flying insects, which it seizes in flight, often fly-catching from a perch. It hunts by sight, silhouetting its prey against the night sky. Its eyes are relatively large, each with a reflective layer, which improves night vision. It appears not to rely on its hearing to find insects and does not echolocate. Drinking and bathing take place during flight. Although it suffers a degree of predation and parasitism, the main threats to the species are habitat loss, disturbance and a reduction of its insect prey through pesticide use. Despite population decreases, its large numbers and huge breeding range mean that it is classified by the International Union for Conservation of Nature as being of least concern.

== Taxonomy ==
The European nightjar was described by Carl Linnaeus in his landmark 1758 10th edition of Systema Naturae under its current scientific name. Caprimulgus is derived from the Latin capra, "nanny goat", and mulgere, "to milk", referring to an old myth that nightjars suck milk from goats, and the species name, europaeus is Latin for "European". The common name "nightjar", first recorded in 1630, refers to the nocturnal habits of the bird, the second part of the name deriving from the distinctive churring song. Old or local names refer to the song, "churn owl", habitat, "fern owl", or diet, "dor hawk" and "moth hawk".

The nightjars, Caprimulgidae, is a large family of mostly nocturnal insect-eating birds. The largest and most widespread genus is Caprimulgus, characterised by stiff bristles around the mouth, long pointed wings, a comb-like middle claw and patterned plumage. Adult males, and sometimes females, have white markings in the wing and tail, shown to serve as male quality indicators. Within the genus, the European nightjar forms a superspecies with the rufous-cheeked nightjar and the sombre nightjar, African species with similar songs. It is replaced further east in Asia by the jungle nightjar which occupies similar habitat.

=== Subspecies ===
There are six recognised subspecies, although the differences are mainly clinal; birds become smaller and paler in the east of the range and the males have larger white wing spots. Birds of intermediate appearance occur where the subspecies' ranges overlap.

Subspecies
Subspecies	Authority	Breeding range	Comments
C. e. europaeus	Linnaeus, 1758	Across north and central Europe and north Central Asia	The nominate subspecies
C. e. meridionalis	Hartert, 1896	Northwest Africa and southern Europe east to the Caspian Sea	Smaller, paler and greyer than nominate, with larger white spots
C. e. sarudnyi	Hartert, 1912	Kazakhstan to Kyrgyzstan	Variable due to interbreeding with other forms, but generally pale with large white spots
C. e. unwini	Hume, 1871	Iraq and Iran east to Uzbekistan	Hume's nightjar; paler, greyer and plainer than the nominate form and often has white throat patches
C. e. plumipes	Przewalski, 1876	Northwestern China and western Mongolia	A pale, sandy-buff form with large white spots
C. e. dementievi	Stegmann, 1949	Northeastern Mongolia	A poorly known paler and greyer form

The fossil record is deficient, but it is likely that these poorly defined subspecies diverged as global temperature rose over the last 10,000 years or so. Only one record of the species possibly dates back to the late Eocene.

== Description ==
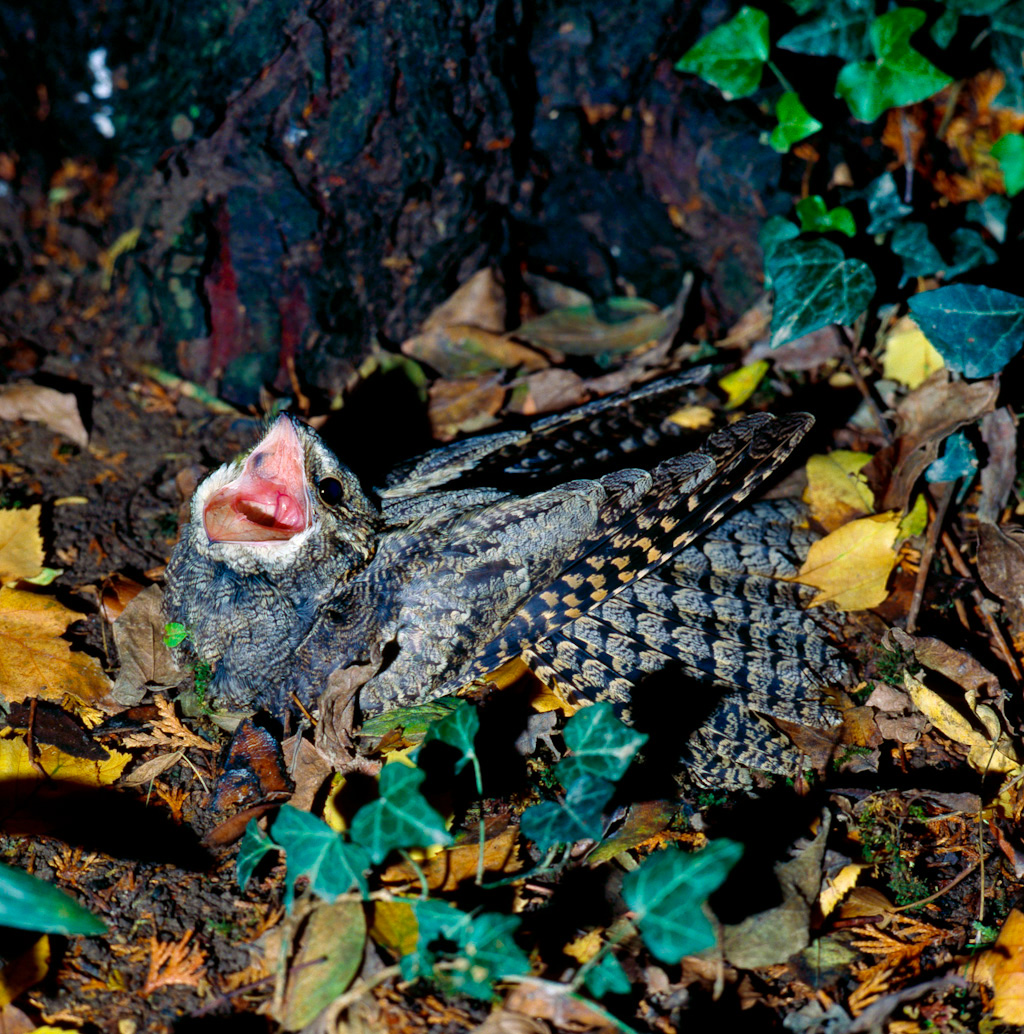
Young bird hissing with mouth open in threat display

The European nightjar is 24.5–28 cm (9.6–11.0 in) long, with a 52–59 cm (20–23 in) wingspan. The male weighs 51–101 g (1.8–3.6 oz) and the female 67–95 g (2.4–3.4 oz). The adult of the nominate subspecies has greyish-brown upperparts with dark streaking, a pale buff hindneck collar and a white moustachial line. The closed wing is grey with buff spotting, and the underparts are greyish-brown, with brown barring and buff spots. The bill is blackish, the iris is dark brown and the legs and feet are brown.

The flight on long pointed wings is noiseless, due to their soft plumage, and very buoyant. Flying birds can be sexed since the male has a white wing patch across three primary feathers and white tips to the two outer tail feathers, whereas females do not show any white in flight. Chicks have downy brown and buff plumage, and the fledged young are similar in appearance to the adult female. Adults moult their body feathers from June onwards after breeding, suspend the process while migrating, and replace the tail and flight feathers on the wintering grounds. Moult is completed between January and March. Immature birds follow a similar moult strategy to the adults unless they are from late broods, in which case the entire moult may take place in Africa.

Other nightjar species occur in parts of the breeding and wintering ranges. The red-necked nightjar breeds in the Iberian Peninsula and northwest Africa; it is larger, greyer and longer winged than the European nightjar, and has a broad buff collar and more conspicuous white markings on the wings and tail. Wintering European nightjars in Africa may overlap with the related rufous-cheeked and sombre nightjars. Both have a more prominent buff hind-neck collar and more spotting on the wing coverts. The sombre nightjar is also much darker than its European cousin. Given their nocturnal habits, cryptic plumage and difficulty of observation, nightjar observation "is as much a matter of fortune as effort or knowledge".

=== Voice ===
The male European nightjar's song is a sustained churring trill, given continuously for up to 10 minutes with occasional shifts of speed or pitch. It is delivered from a perch, and the male may move around its territory using different song posts. Singing is more frequent at dawn and dusk than during the night, and is reduced in poor weather. The song may end with a bubbling trill and wing-clapping, perhaps indicating the approach of a female. Migrating or wintering birds sometimes sing. Individual male nightjars can be identified by analysing the rate and length of the pulses in their songs. Even a singing male may be hard to locate; the perched bird is difficult to spot in low light conditions, and the song has a ventriloquial quality as the singer turns his head. The song is easily audible at 200 m (660 ft), and can be heard at 600 m (2,000 ft) in good conditions; it can be confused with the very similar sound of the European mole cricket.

The female does not sing, but when on the wing, both sexes give a short cuick, cuick call, also used when chasing predators. Other calls include variations on a sharp chuck when alarmed, hisses given by adults when handled or chicks when disturbed, and an assortment of wuk, wuk, wuk, muffled oak, oak and murmurs given at the nest. Large young have a threat display with the mouth opened wide while hissing loudly.

Despite the name, wing-clapping does not involve contact between the two wing tips over the bird's back as was once thought. The sound is produced in a whiplash-like way as each wing cracks down.

== Distribution and habitat ==
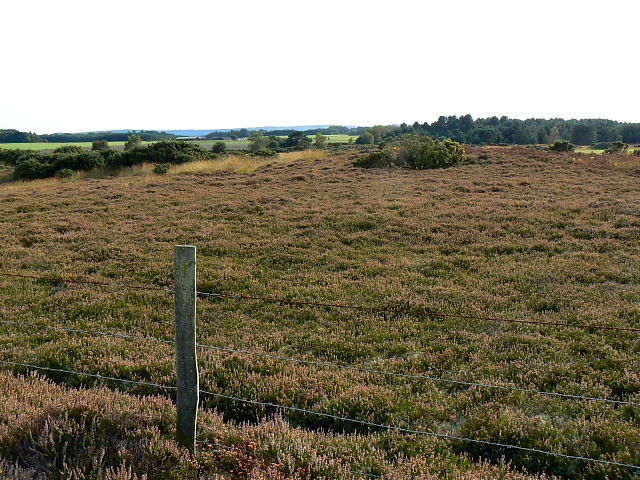
Heathland is a favoured habitat.

The breeding range of the European nightjar comprises Europe north to around latitude 64°N and Asia north to about 60°N and east to Lake Baikal and eastern Mongolia. The southern limits are northwestern Africa, Iraq, Iran and the northwestern Himalayas. This nightjar formerly bred in Syria and Lebanon.

All populations are migratory, and most birds winter in Africa south of the Sahara, with just a few records from Pakistan, Morocco and Israel. Migration is mainly at night, singly or in loose groups of up to twenty birds. European breeders cross the Mediterranean and North Africa, whereas eastern populations move through the Middle East and East Africa. Some Asian birds may therefore cross 100° of longitude on their travels. Most birds start their migration at the time of a full moon.

Most birds winter in eastern or southeastern Africa, although individuals of the nominate race have been recently discovered wintering in the Democratic Republic of the Congo; records elsewhere in West Africa may be wintering birds of this subspecies or C. e. meridionalis. Most autumn migration takes place from August to September, and the birds return to the breeding grounds by May. Recent tracking data has revealed that European nightjars have a loop migration from Western Europe to sub-equatorial Africa where they have to cross several ecological barriers (the Mediterranean Sea, the Sahara and the Central African Tropical Rainforest). Individuals use similar stop-over sites as do other European migrants. Vagrants have occurred in Iceland, the Faroe Islands, the Seychelles, the Azores, Madeira and the Canary Islands.

The European nightjar is a bird of dry, open country with some trees and small bushes, such as heaths, commons, moorland, forest clearings or felled or newly planted woodland. When breeding, it avoids treeless or heavily wooded areas, cities, mountains, and farmland, but it often feeds over wetlands, cultivation or gardens. In winter it uses a wider range of open habitats including acacia steppe, sandy country and highlands. It has been recorded at altitudes of 2,800 m (9,200 ft) on the breeding grounds and 5,000 m (16,000 ft) in the wintering areas.

== Behaviour ==
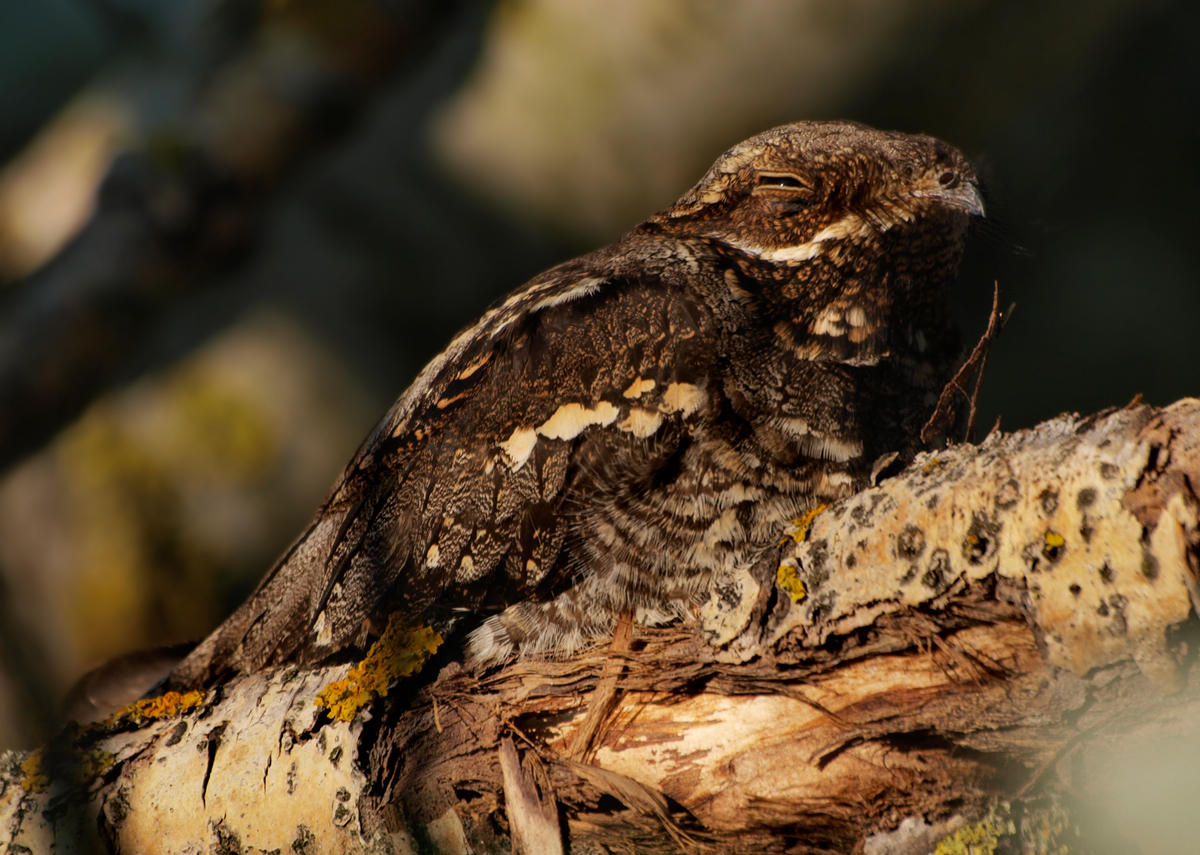
Roosting lengthwise on a branch to enhance camouflage

The European nightjar is crepuscular and nocturnal. During the day it rests on the ground, often in a partly shaded location, or perches motionless lengthwise along an open branch or a similar low perch. The cryptic plumage makes it difficult to see in the daytime, and birds on the ground, if they are not already in shade, will turn occasionally to face the sun thereby minimising their shadow. If it feels threatened, the nightjar flattens itself to the ground with eyes almost closed, flying only when the intruder is 2–5 m (7–16 ft) away. It may call or wing clap as it goes, and land as far as 40 m (130 ft) from where it was flushed. In the wintering area it often roosts on the ground but also uses tree branches up to 20 m (66 ft) high. Roost sites at both the breeding and wintering grounds are used regularly if they are undisturbed, sometimes for weeks at a time.

Like other nightjars, it will sit on roads or paths during the night and hover to investigate large intruders such as deer or humans. It may be mobbed by birds while there is still light, and by bats, other nightjar species or Eurasian woodcocks during the night. Owls and other predators such as red foxes will be mobbed by both male and female European nightjars. Like other aerial birds, such as swifts and swallows, nightjars make a quick plunge into water to wash. They have a unique serrated comb-like structure on the middle claw, which is used to preen and perhaps to remove parasites.

In cold or inclement weather, several nightjar species can slow their metabolism and go into torpor, notably the common poorwill, which will maintain that state for weeks. The European nightjar has been observed in captivity to be able to maintain a state of torpor for at least eight days without harm, but the relevance of this to wild birds is unknown.

=== Breeding ===
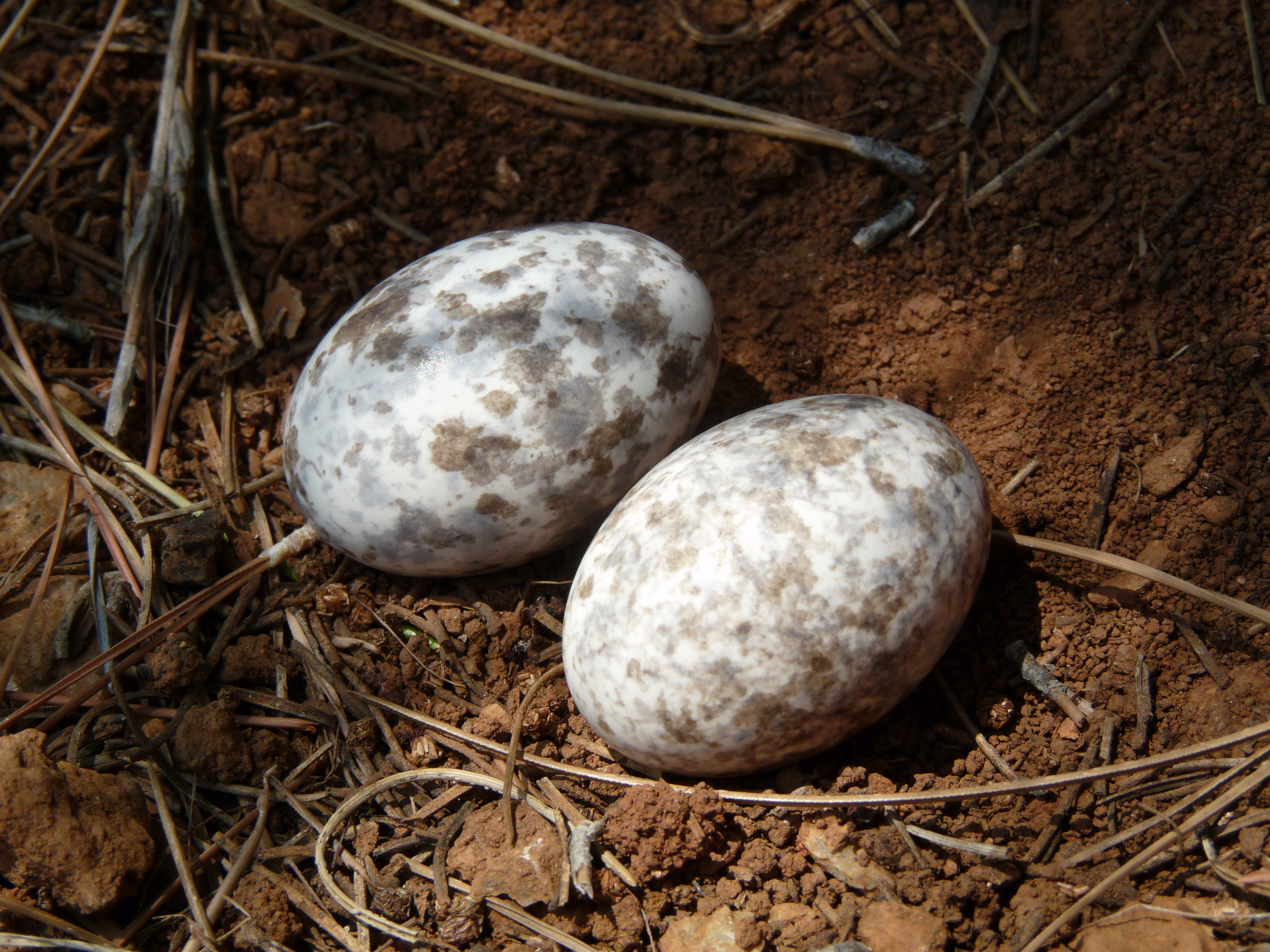
A clutch of two eggs on the ground in Turkey

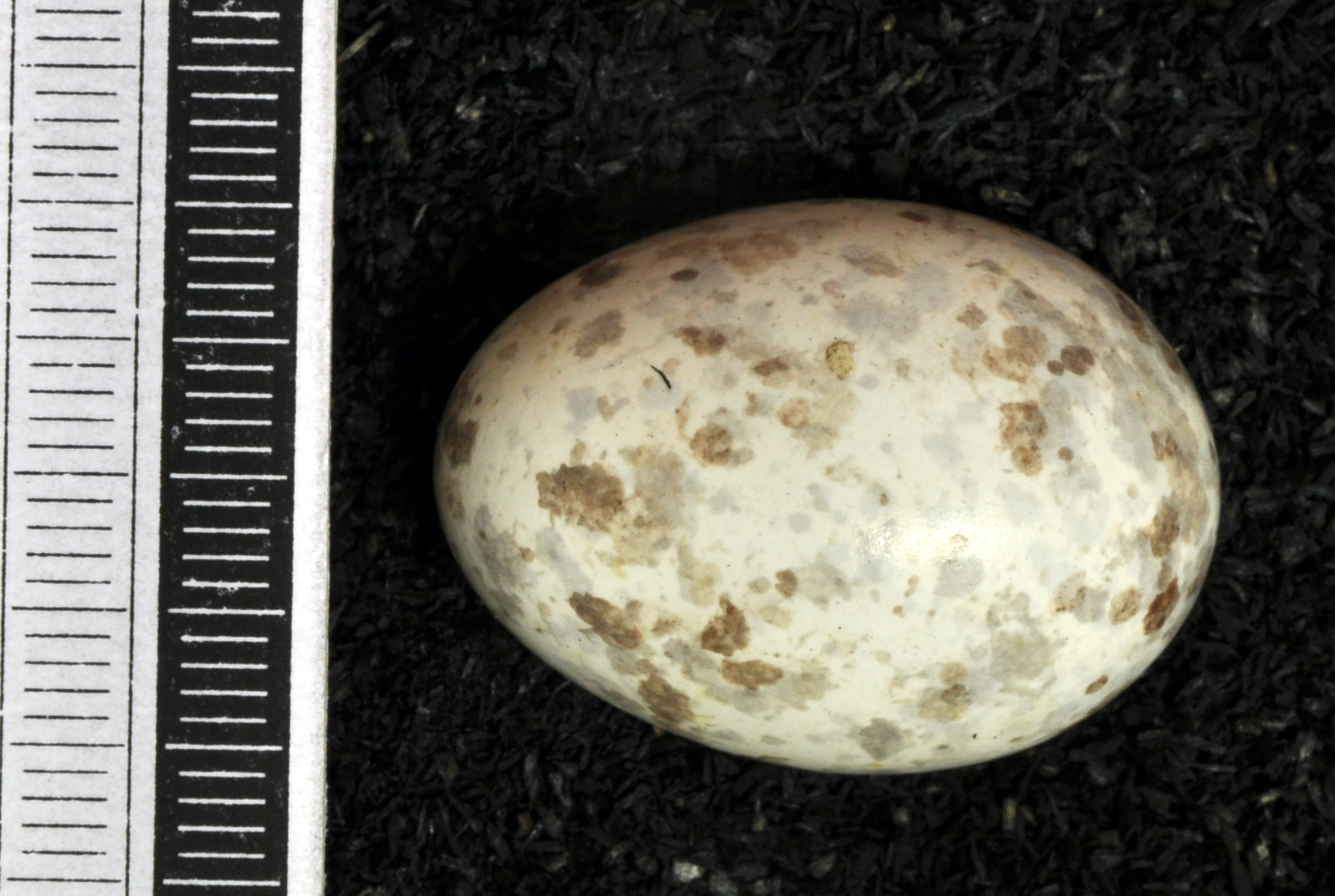
Egg, Collection Museum Wiesbaden

Breeding is normally from late May to August, but may be significantly earlier in northwest Africa or western Pakistan. Returning males arrive about two weeks before the females and establish territories which they patrol with wings held in a V-shape and tail fanned, chasing intruders while wing-clapping and calling. Fights may take place in flight or on the ground. The male's display flight involves a similar wing and tail position with frequent wing clapping as he follows the female in a rising spiral. If she lands, he continues to display with bobbing and fluttering until the female spreads her wings and tail for copulation. Mating occasionally takes place on a raised perch instead of the ground. In good habitat, there may be 20 pairs per square kilometre (50 per square mile).

The European nightjar is normally monogamous. There is no nest, and the eggs are laid on the ground among plants or tree roots, or beneath a bush or tree. The site may be bare ground, leaf litter or pine needles, and is used for a number of years. The clutch is usually one or two whitish eggs, rarely unmarked, but normally blotched with browns and greys. The eggs average 32 mm × 22 mm (1.26 in × 0.87 in) and weigh 8.4 g (0.30 oz), of which 6% is shell.

Several nightjar species are known to be more likely to lay in the two weeks before the full moon than the during the waning moon, possibly because insect food may be easier to catch as the moon waxes. A study specifically looking at the European nightjar showed that the phase of the moon is a factor for birds laying in June, but not for earlier breeders. This strategy means that a second brood in July would also have a favourable lunar aspect.

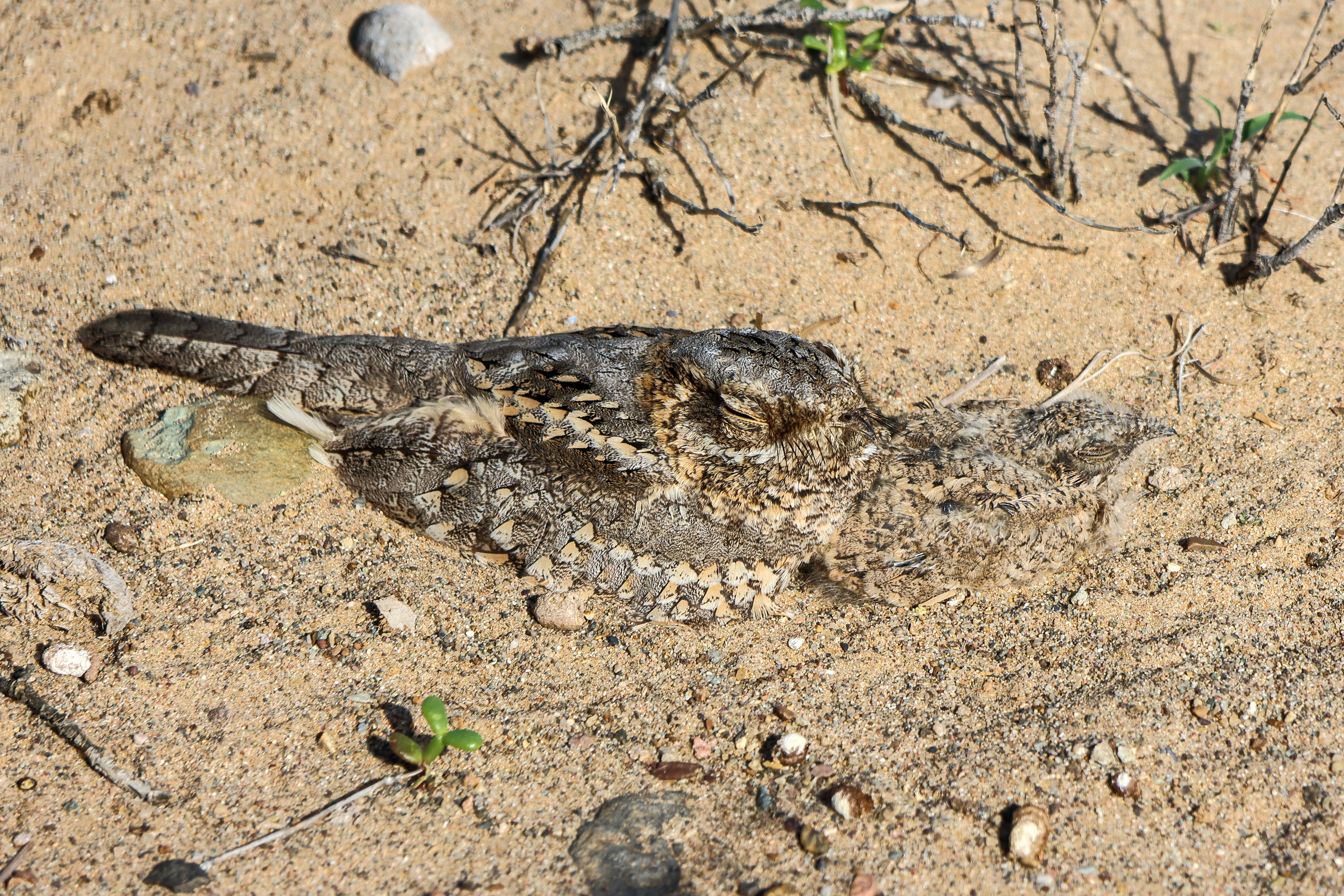
Adults with chicks from Saudi Arabia

Eggs are laid 36–48 hours apart, and incubation, mainly by the female, starts with the first egg. The male may incubate for short periods, especially around dawn or dusk, but spends the day roosting, sometimes outside his territory or close to other males. If the female is disturbed while breeding, she runs or flutters along the ground feigning injury until she has drawn the intruder away. She may also move the eggs a short distance with her bill. Each egg hatches after about 17–21 days. The semi-precocial downy chicks are mobile when hatched, but are brooded to keep them warm. They fledge in 16–17 days and become independent of the adults around 32 days after hatching. A second brood may be raised by early nesting pairs, in which case the female leaves the first brood a few days before they fledge; the male then cares for the first brood and assists with the second. Both adults feed the young with balls of insects which are either regurgitated into the chick's mouth or pecked by the chick from the adult's open bill.

Broods that fail tend to do so during incubation. One English study showed that only 14.5% of eggs survived to hatching, but once that stage was reached the chances of fledging successfully were high. European nightjars breed when aged one year, and typically live four years. The adult annual survival rate is 70%, but that for juveniles is unknown. The maximum known age in the wild is just over 12 years.

=== Feeding ===
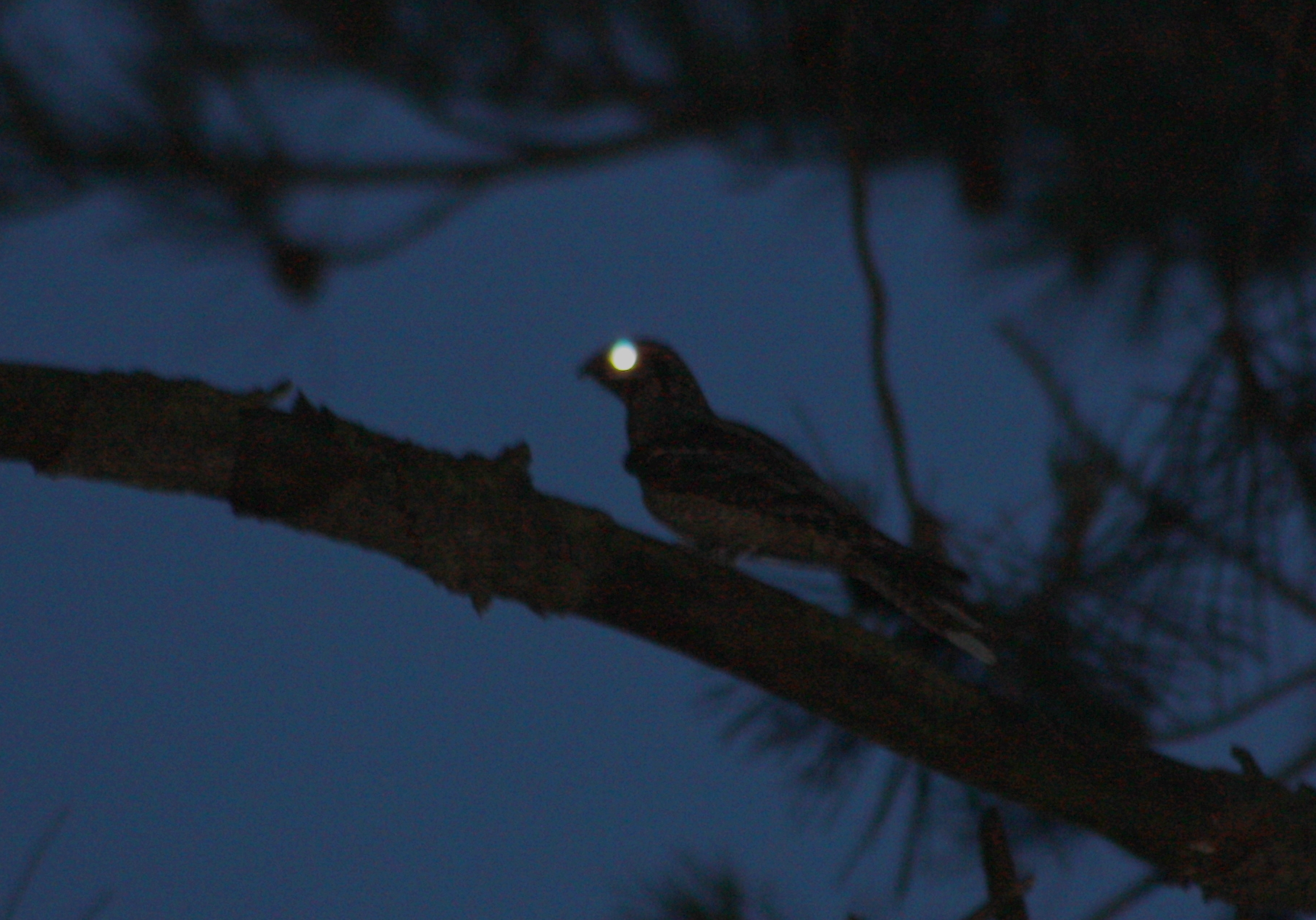
Perching in a tree at night in France. The eyeshine is due to reflected light.

The European nightjar feeds on a wide variety of flying insects, including moths, beetles, mantises, dragonflies, cockroaches and flies. It will pick glowworms off vegetation. It consumes grit to aid with digesting its prey, but any plant material and non-flying invertebrates consumed are taken inadvertently while hunting other food items. Young chicks have been known to eat their own faeces.

Birds hunt over open habitats and woodland clearings and edges, and may be attracted to insects concentrating around artificial lights, near farm animals or over stagnant ponds. They usually feed at night, but occasionally venture out on overcast days. Nightjars pursue insects with a light twisting flight, or flycatch from a perch; they may rarely take prey off the ground. They drink by dipping to the water surface as they fly. Breeding European nightjars travel on average 3.1 km (3,400 yd) from their nests to feed. Migrating birds live off their fat reserves.

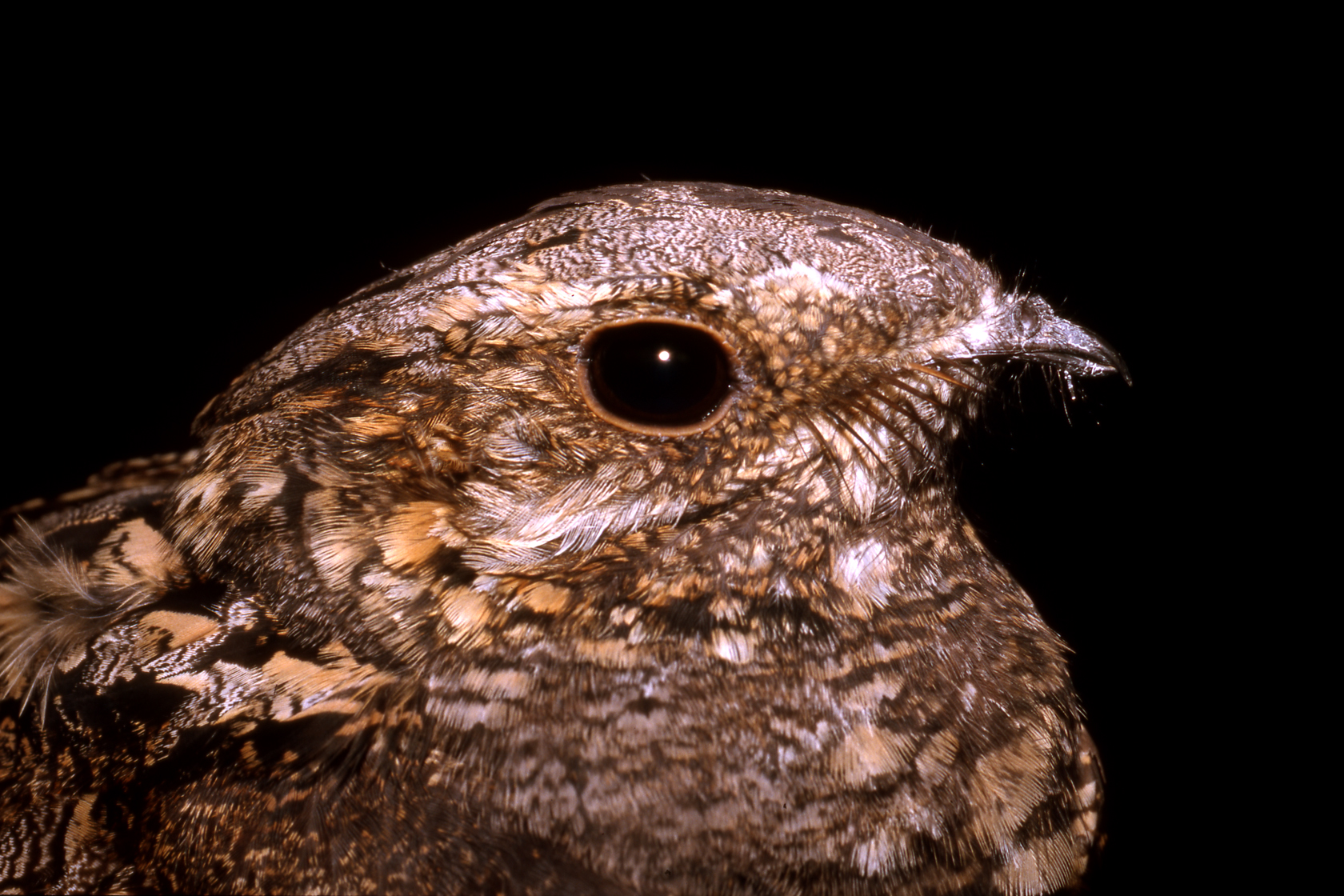
Bristles around the mouth may help in feeding

European nightjars hunt by sight, silhouetting their prey against the night sky. They tend to flycatch from a perch on moonlit nights, but fly continuously on darker nights when prey is harder to see; Tracking experiments show that feeding activity more than doubles on moonlit nights. Hunting frequency reduces in the middle of the night. Although they have very small bills, the mouth can be opened very wide as they catch insects. They have long sensitive bristles around the mouth, which may help to locate or funnel prey into the mouth. Indigestible parts of insects, such as the chitin exoskeleton, are regurgitated as pellets. They often hunt around herds, especially herds of livestock including goats, sheep and cattle. These animals attract huge amounts of haematophagous insects.

Nightjars have relatively large eyes, each with a tapetum lucidum (reflective layer behind the retina) that makes the eyes shine in torchlight and improves light detection at dusk, dawn and in moonlight. The retinas of nocturnal birds, including nightjars, are adapted for sight in low-light areas and have a higher density of rod cells and far fewer cone cells compared to those of most diurnal birds. These adaptations favour good night vision at the expense of colour discrimination In many day-flying species, light passes through coloured oil droplets within the cone cells to improve colour vision. In contrast, nightjars have a limited number of cone cells, either lacking or having only a few oil droplets. The nocturnal eyesight of nightjars is probably equivalent to that of owls. Although they have good hearing, European nightjars appear not to rely on sound to find insects, and nightjars do not echolocate.

== Predators and parasites ==
The eggs and chicks of this ground-nesting bird are vulnerable to predation by red foxes, pine martens, European hedgehogs, least weasels and domestic dogs, and by birds including crows, Eurasian magpies, Eurasian jays and owls. Snakes, such as common adders, may also rob the nest. Adults may be caught by birds of prey including northern goshawks, hen harriers, Eurasian sparrowhawks, common buzzards, peregrines and sooty falcons.

Parasites recorded on the European nightjar include a single species of biting louse found on the wings, and a feather mite that occurs only on the white wing markings. Avian malaria has also been recorded. The leucocytozoon blood parasite L. caprimulgi is rare in the European nightjar. Its scarcity and the fact that it is the only one of its genus found in nightjars support the suggestion that it has crossed over from close relatives that normally infect owls.

== Status ==
The global population of the European nightjar in 2020 was estimated at 3–6 million birds, and estimates of the European population ranged from 290,000 to 830,000 individuals. Although there appeared to be a fall in numbers, it is not rapid enough to trigger the vulnerability criteria. The huge breeding range and population mean that this species is classified on the IUCN Red List as least concern.

The largest breeding populations of up to 500,000 pairs as of 2012 were in Russia, 112,000 pairs in Spain and 60,000 pairs in Belarus. There have been declines in much of the range, but especially in northwestern Europe. The loss of insect prey through pesticide use, coupled with disturbance, collision with vehicles and habitat loss have contributed to the falling population. As ground-nesting birds, they are adversely affected by disturbance, especially by domestic dogs, which may destroy the nest or advertise its presence to crows or predatory mammals. Breeding success is higher in areas with no public access; where access is permitted, and particularly where dog owners allow their pets to run loose, successful nests tend to be far from footpaths or human habitation.

In Britain and elsewhere, commercial forestry has created new habitat which has increased numbers, but these gains are likely to be temporary as the woodland develops and becomes unsuitable for nightjars. In the United Kingdom, it is red-listed as a cause for concern, and in Ireland it was close to extinction as of 2012.

== In culture ==
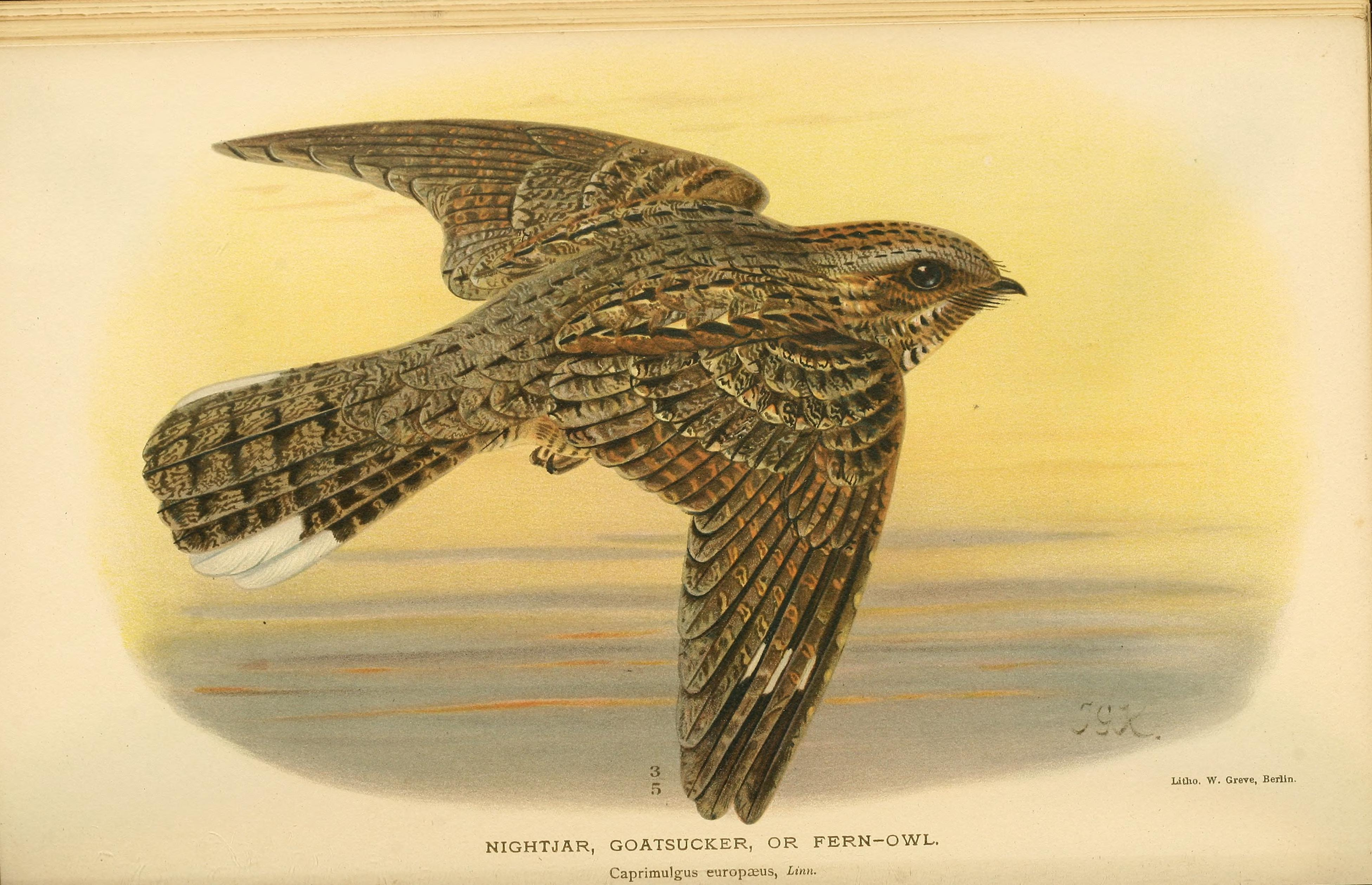
"Nightjar, goatsucker, or fern-owl", alternative old names, by J.G. Keulemans

Poets sometimes use the nightjar as an indicator of warm summer nights, as in George Meredith's "Love in the Valley";

Lone on the fir-branch, his rattle-notes unvaried
Brooding o'er the gloom, spins the brown eve-jar

Wordsworth's "Calm is the fragrant air":

The busy dor-hawk chases the white moth
With burring note.

or Dylan Thomas's "Fern Hill":

and all the night long I heard, blessed among stables, the nightjars
flying with the ricks

Nightjars sing only when perched, and Thomas Hardy referenced the eerie silence of a hunting bird in "Afterwards":

If it be in the dusk when, like an eyelid's soundless blink
The dewfall-hawk comes crossing the shades to alight
Upon the wind-warped upland thorn.

In the final track on Divers, Time, As a Symptom, Joanna Newsom rounds out the album with a litany of:

No time, no flock, no chime, no clock, no end
White star, white ship, Nightjar, transmit, transcend (joy)
White star, white ship, Nightjar, transmit, transcend (we go down)
White star, white ship, Nightjar, transmit, transcend
White star, white ship, Nightjar, transmit, tran- [birdsong]

Caprimulgus and the old name "goatsucker" both refer to the myth, old even in the time of Aristotle, that nightjars suckled from nanny goats, which subsequently ceased to give milk or went blind. This ancient belief is reflected in nightjar names in other European languages, such as German Ziegenmelker, Polish kozodój and Italian succiacapre, which also mean goatsucker, but despite its antiquity, it has no equivalents in Arab, Chinese or Hindu traditions. The birds are attracted by insects around domestic animals and, as unusual nocturnal creatures, were then blamed for any misfortune that befell the beast. Another old name, "puckeridge", was used to refer to both the bird and a disease of farm animals, the latter actually caused by botfly larvae under the skin. "Lich fowl" (corpse bird) is an old name which reflects the superstitions that surrounded this strange nocturnal bird. Like "gabble ratchet" (corpse hound), it may refer to the belief that the souls of unbaptised children were doomed to wander in nightjar form until Judgement Day. (Note: "Gabble" refers to Gabriel. "Gabriel" hounds were unseen dogs howling in the night, and the nightjar is seen as part of the Wild Hunt tradition.)

== Cited texts ==
- Barthel, Peter H; Dougalis, Paschalis (2008). New Holland Field Guide to the Birds of Britain and Europe. London: New Holland. ISBN 978-1-84773-110-4.
- Blaine, Delabere Pritchett (1816). The outlines of the veterinary art as applied to the horse (2nd ed.). London: T. Boosey.
- Burton, Robert (1985). Bird Behaviour. London: Granada Publishing. ISBN 978-0-246-12440-1.
- Cleere, Nigel; Nurney, David (1998). Nightjars: A Guide to the Nightjars, Frogmouths, Potoos, Oilbird and Owlet-nightjars of the World. Pica / Christopher Helm. ISBN 978-1-873403-48-8.
- Cocker, Mark; Mabey, Richard (2005). Birds Britannica. London: Chatto & Windus. ISBN 978-0-7011-6907-7.
- Cocker, Mark; Tipling, David (2013). Birds and People. London: Jonathan Cape. ISBN 978-0-224-08174-0.
- van Grouw, Katrina (2012). The Unfeathered Bird. Princeton: Princeton University Press. ISBN 978-0-691-15134-2.
- Holyoak, David; Woodcock, Martin (2001). Nightjars and Their Allies: The Caprimulgiformes. Oxford: Oxford University Press. ISBN 978-0-19-854987-1.
- Jobling, James A (2010). The Helm Dictionary of Scientific Bird Names. London: Christopher Helm. ISBN 978-1-4081-2501-4.
- Linnaeus, Carl (1758). Systema naturae per regna tria naturae, secundum classes, ordines, genera, species, cum characteribus, differentiis, synonymis, locis. Tomus I. Editio decima, reformata (in Latin). Holmiae: Laurentii Salvii.
- Lockwood, William Burley (1984). Oxford Book of British Bird Names. Oxford: Oxford University Press. ISBN 978-0-19-214155-2.
- Mullarney, Killian; Svensson, Lars; Zetterstrom, Dan; Grant, Peter (1999). Collins Bird Guide. London: Collins. ISBN 978-0-00-219728-1.
- O'Connor, Anne (2005). The Blessed and the Damned: Sinful Women and Unbaptised Children in Irish Folklore. Oxford: Peter Lang. ISBN 978-3-03910-541-0.
- Roots, Clive (2006). Nocturnal Animals. Santa Barbara, California: Greenwood Press. ISBN 978-0-313-33546-4.
- Rothschild, Miriam; Clay, Theresa (1957). Fleas, Flukes and Cuckoos. A study of bird parasites. New York: Macmillan.
- Sinclair, Sandra (1985). How Animals See: Other Visions of Our World. Beckenham, Kent: Croom Helm. ISBN 978-0-7099-3336-6.
- Snow, David; Perrins, Christopher M, eds. (1998). The Birds of the Western Palearctic concise edition (2 volumes). Oxford: Oxford University Press. ISBN 978-0-19-854099-1.
- Valkiunas, Gediminas (2004). Avian Malaria Parasites and other Haemosporidia. London: CRC Press. ISBN 978-0-415-30097-1.
