= Leucocytozoon andrewsi =

Scientific classification
- Domain: Eukaryota
- Clade: Sar
- Clade: Alveolata
- Phylum: Apicomplexa
- Class: Aconoidasida
- Order: Haemosporida
- Family: Leucocytozoidae
- Genus: Leucocytozoon
- Species: L. andrewsi

Binomial name
- Leucocytozoon andrewsi Atchley, 1951

Species of single-celled organism

Leucocytozoon andrewsi is a parasite of the genus Leucocytozoon.

Like all Leucocytozoon species L. andrewsi has both vertebrate and insect hosts. The invertebrate hosts belong to the flies of the genus Simulium. The vertebrate hosts for this parasite are chickens.

== Description ==
The parasite was first described by Atchley in 1951.

== Geographical occurrence ==
This species is found in the United States of America.

== Clinical features and host pathology ==
This species infects chickens (Gallus gallus domesticus).
