= Leucocytozoon grallariae =

Scientific classification
- Domain: Eukaryota
- Clade: Sar
- Clade: Alveolata
- Phylum: Apicomplexa
- Class: Aconoidasida
- Order: Haemosporida
- Family: Leucocytozoidae
- Genus: Leucocytozoon
- Species: L. grallariae

Binomial name
- Leucocytozoon grallariae Lotta et al., 2019

Species of single-celled organism

Leucocytozoon grallariae is a parasite found in non-migratory highland passeriforms in the families Grallariidae and Cotingidae. The species was first described by Ingrid A. Lotta, Valkiūnas Gediminas, M. Andreína Pacheco, Ananías A. Escalante, Sandra Rocío Hernández and Nubia E. Matta in 2019. Leucocytozoon grallariae is spread throughout in the Andean mountain ranges normally in humid forests and scrublands of Bolivia, Peru, Ecuador, Colombia and Venezuela.

They contain gametocytes within fusiform host cells. However, it's been determined that these parasites are present in co-infections with other species belonging to the genus Leucocytozoon. In this parasite, gametocytes develop in circular shaped host cells which exhibits two highly distant parasite lineages isolated from the same samples. Young gametocytes have an effect on the shape of host cells starting at primal stages of their development. Parasites that are growing have oval or ellipsoid shapes; these parasites stick to the host cell nuclei, which are enlarged, deformed and have a crescent shape. The host's cell cytoplasm near growing gametocytes. Advanced young gametocytes have invaginations lining their sides. This is opposite to the host cell nuclei, which gives the growing gametocytes the appearance of giant beans with rounded ends. Host cells take on the ellipsoid shape from the very early stages of gametocyte development. The rest of the life cycle follows the same as the rest of the Leucocytozoon species.
