= Megaloschizont =

Intracellular parasite

Megaloschizonts are large schizonts that produce extremely high numbers of merozoites. They are found in various species of the Phylum Apicomplexa. The Apicomplexa phylum contains several parasitic protozoans. They have a very complex life cycle that includes several stages. Megaloschizonts and the smaller schizonts are the part of the life cycle that takes place inside the infected host organism and operates as an asexually reproductive cell. Megaloschizonts appear as grey-white nodules found in the smooth muscle of major organs, such as the heart, liver, lung or spleen.

== History of the term ==
The term megaloschizont was first used by Clay G. Huff from the University of Chicago. In studying various infectious diseases caused by parasitic protozoans from the Apicomplexa phylum, Dr. Huff noticed two types of schizonts developing in the infected hosts. He noticed smaller schizonts were found in the hepatic regions of the host, these ranged in size from 11 to 18 micrometers. The larger schizonts, ranging in size from 60 to 105 micrometers, were found in blood vessels or in contact with the muscle tissue. Dr. Huff referred to these large schizonts as megaloschizonts. It was hypothesized that in this particular case, the megaloschizont (produced asexually) was responsible for producing merozoites that would develop into gametocytes, the sexually reproducing stage of the Apicomplexa life cycle.

== Background information ==
Megaloschizonts are part of the Apicomplexa life cycle. They are formed during a process called schizogony, which can also be called merogony. This is an asexual reproductive process found primarily in parasitic protists. The parasitic, infectious cell that infects a host is called a sporozoite. This sporozoite infects the host organism by entering the blood stream and eventually settling in a vital organ such as the heart, liver, lung, or spleen. Once infecting the host organism's cell, the sporozoite begins feeding and growing. While it is feeding and growing, the cell is known as a trophozoite. This trophozoite is the cell that begins the process of schizogony.

The process of schizogony is when a cell undergoes multiple nuclear divisions before undergoing cytokinesis or division of the cytoplasm. There is no specific number of nuclear divisions during schizogony. The number of nuclear divisions is species specific and even within a single species the number of nuclear divisions can differ depending on the phase of the life cycle. For example, Plasmodium (parasite that can cause malaria) undergoes four different types of schizogony producing anywhere from 8 to over 20,000 nuclei. A cell currently undergoing schizogony is known as a schizont. If a cell has a very large number of nuclei, it is known as a megaloschizont.

The thousands of nuclei in a megaloschizont become merozoites. Merozoites are non-mobile cells that are circulated through the host by the bloodstream and infect other cells in the host organism. Merozoites are released when the megaloschizont breaks apart. This can be caused by the megaloschizont simply reaching full capacity and self-lysing of the membrane or it can be caused by the membrane being attacked by the organism's immune-response cells.

== Megaloschizont-producing parasite species and hosts ==
Haemoproteus infects reptiles and birds

Nycteria infects bats

Polychromophilus infects bats

Hepatocystis infects monkeys and other mammals

Leucocytozoon infects various avian species

Eimeria infects mammals including rabbits and chamois

== Examples of megaloschizont infections ==
New Zealand, 2010: The endangered yellow-eyed penguin is found in southern New Zealand. The population has been reduced by more than 60% since 1990. Researchers collected blood samples from the penguins. They found Leucocytozoon hepatic megaloschizonts in up to 95% of the sampled organisms. This genus of parasite is known to cause many problems in closely related avian species. These problems include tissue damage, reduced fertility, and reduced growth. It was concluded that the yellow-eyed penguins were being infected by biting black flies in their nesting area.

Scotland, 2006: A species of Besnoitia, a parasitic protozoan, from the Apicomplexa phyla was found in several parakeet-like avians in areas of Scotland. Megaloschizonts presented as gray nodules in several different areas of the infected organisms. The megaloschizonts were most numerous in the smooth muscle of the heart and gizzard, but were also found in smooth muscle of the intestine, lung, and skin.

Miami MetroZoo, 1992: 4 cases of hepatic coccidiosis were found in a herd of chamois at the Miami MetroZoo. Chamois are antelope-like animals that are found naturally in the mountains of Europe. The animals at the zoo died over a 7-year period. After completing necropsies, it was determined that the organisms were infected with a parasitic protozoan of the genus Eimeria. This species had produced megaloschizonts in the intrahepatic bile ducts and portal veins. The presence of these megaloschizonts was hypothesized to have caused periportal hepatitis and fibrosis. The infectious disease was determined to have contributed to the death of the organisms.

Florida, U.S., 1987: A wild turkey that died in captivity two days after capture was found to be infected with megaloschizonts from Haemoproteus meleagridis. Haemoproteus is a genus of parasitic protozoa that belong to the Apicomplexa phyla. The megaloschizont cells measured 50 to 100 micrometers. The merozoites inside the megaloschizonts were less than 1 micrometer in diameter. The infectious cells were found in various sections of the host organism including the liver, the spleen, the intestines, and the cloaca. Smooth muscle tissue surrounding the megaloschizont cells was found to be partially calcified, pale, swollen, and early signs of necrosis were noted.
