= Akiba ben Judah Loeb =

Akiba ben Judah Loeb was a German rabbi, who lived in Lehren-Steinsfeld, Württemberg, at the beginning of the eighteenth century. He wrote Ha-Ohel 'Olam (Everlasting Tent), containing novellæ on the Talmudic treatise Ketubot (Frankfurt-am-Main, 1714). Appended to it are four responsa as well as an essay from his unpublished works, on Seder Zera'im. In addition to these he left two books on Seder Taharot, which are still extant in manuscript.
