= Akiba Lehren =

- Born: 30 July 1795
- Died: 19 November 1876
- Occupations: Banker, rabbi, talmudist

Akiba Mozes Lehren (30 July 1795 – 19 November 1876) was a Dutch banker and communal worker, younger brother of Ẓebi Hirsch Lehren and Jacob Meïr Lehren.

He was president of the organization Pekidim and Amarcalim of Amsterdam, and in 1844 became involved in the literary dispute of his brother Hirsch concerning the administration of the Ḥaluḳḳah (see Fürst in Der Orient, 1844, p. 17). He died in Amsterdam on 19 November 1876.

Both Akiba and his brother Meïr possessed very rich and valuable collections of Hebrew books, a sale catalogue of which was arranged and published by J. L. Joachimsthal, Amsterdam, 1899 (comp. Zeit. für Hebr. Bibl. 1899, p. 152). Akiba published a very poor edition of Isaac ben Moses' Or Zarua', parts i. and ii., according to an Amsterdam manuscript, Jitomir, 1862 (Steinschneider, Zeit. für Hebr. Bibl. viii. 1 et seq.).

== Jewish Encyclopedia bibliography ==
- Allg. Zeit. des Jud. 1876, p. 809;
- Ha-Maggid, 1876, p. 412;
- Univ. Isr. 1876, p. 217.
