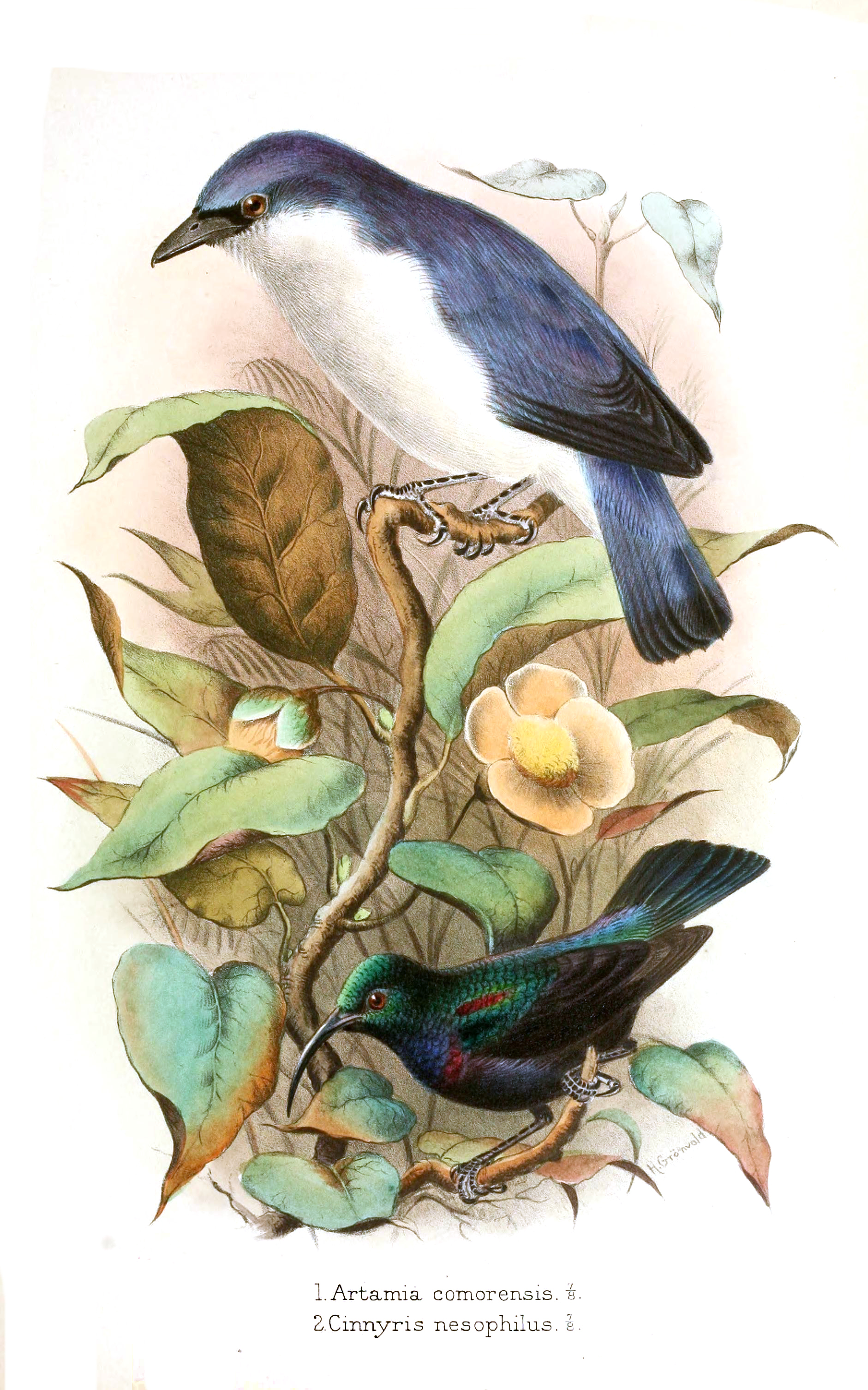

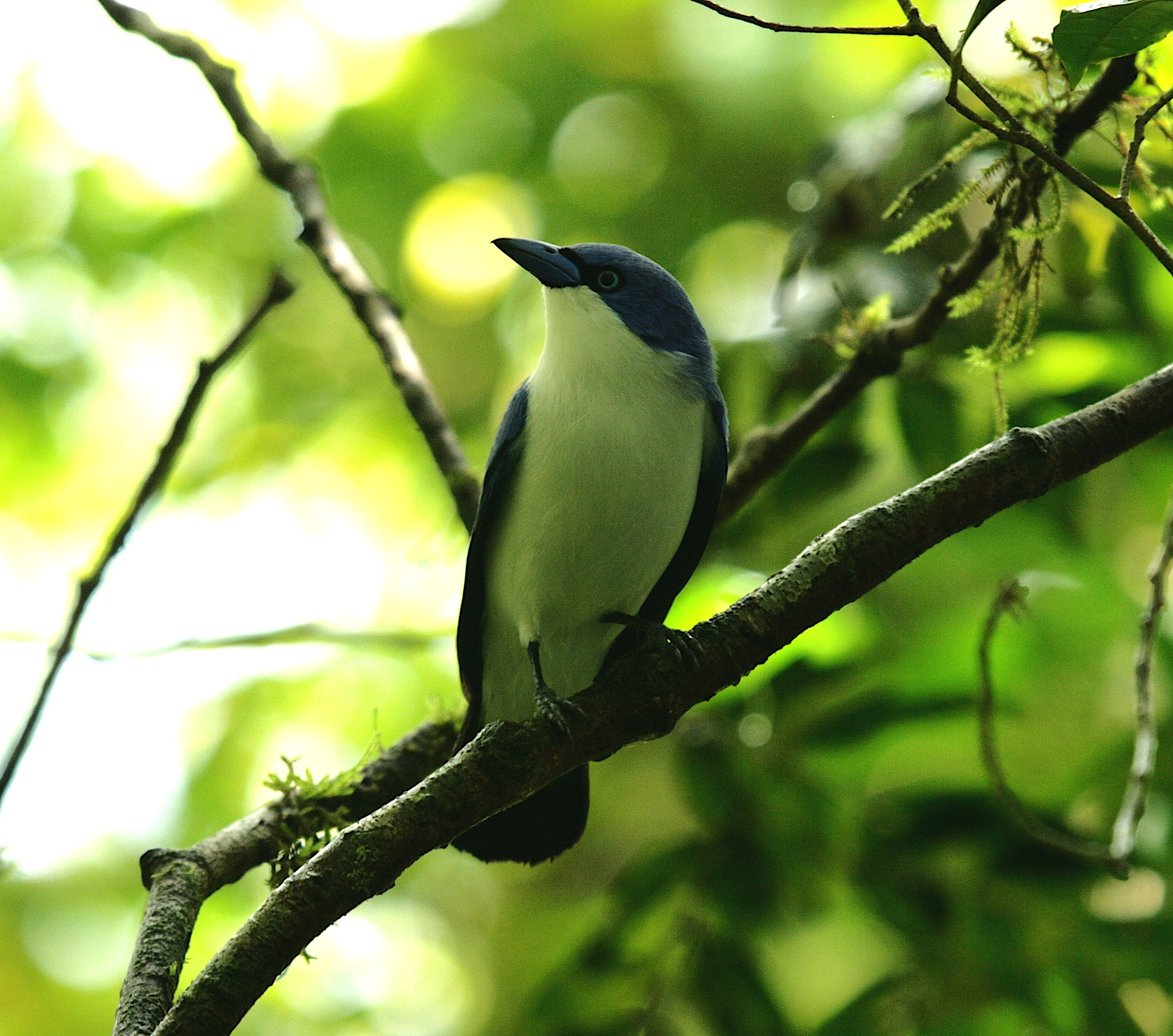

Conservation status
- Near Threatened (IUCN 3.1)

Scientific classification
- Kingdom: Animalia
- Phylum: Chordata
- Class: Aves
- Order: Passeriformes
- Family: Vangidae
- Genus: Cyanolanius
- Species: C. comorensis

Binomial name
- Cyanolanius comorensis (Shelley, 1894)

= Comoros blue vanga =

Species of bird

The Comoros blue vanga or Comoro blue vanga (Cyanolanius comorensis) is a bird species in the family Vangidae. It is found in the Comoros, where its natural habitats are subtropical or tropical dry forest and subtropical or tropical moist lowland forest.

== Subspecies ==
Two subspecies are recognised:

- C. m. comorensis (Shelley, 1894): Also known as the Comoros blue vanga, it is found on Mohéli in the Comoro Islands. It tends to be larger than madagarensis and is also exhibits slight differences in colour. It has occasionally been considered as distinct species
- C. m. bensoni Louette & Herremans, 1982: It is found on Grande Comore in the Comoro Islands. It is described from only a single immature specimen, and looks very similar to comorensis. Doubts have been cast on whether it is a distinctive taxon.

It has a ultramarine blue beak with a black tip in males and a dark brown tip in females. The iris is pale blue in adults, while the legs and feet are black or dark slate in colour.

== Distribution ==
The species is found on the islands of Grand Comore and Mohéli in the Comoros Islands.

It inhabits a variety of woodland on the Comoro Islands. It is known to inhabits habitats above an elevation of 300 m (980 ft) on Mohéli. On Grand Comore, it is mainly known from degraded forest patches with banana cultivation on the slopes of Mount Karthala at an elevation of 700–900 m (2,300–3,000 ft).

== Status ==
The species on the Comoro Islands is threatened by a limited range, deforestation and habitat loss, and degradation of the habitat due to invasive plant species like Syzygium jambos, Lantana camara and Clidemia hirta.
