= Akiva ha-Kohen =

Jewish scholar (died 1496)

Akiva ha-Kohen of Ofen
- Died: 1496 Prague, Bohemia

Religious life
- Religion: Judaism

Akiva ben Menaḥem ha-Kohen of Ofen (died 1496) was a Jewish scholar who lived in Hungary and Bohemia in the second half of the fifteenth century. He is the first rabbi in Buda whose name is recorded. Epigraphs of members of the family in Prague refer to him as "Nasi" and "head of the entire Diaspora".

== Biography ==
His learning, wealth, and benevolence secured for him the title "Nasi" (Prince), and an influential position at the court of King Matthew of Hungary about 1480. This promotion excited the envy of the nobles to such a degree that they slandered him to the king, and he was compelled to leave the country. He settled at Prague and there established a large Talmudic college, at which he himself lectured. Here, too, jealous enemies persecuted him, and even attempted his life.

In grateful memorial of three fortunate escapes, he presented three of the synagogues of Prague with costly curtains for the Torah ark. Akiva, who was a kohen, had twelve sons and thirteen daughters: twelve of the latter he gave in marriage to kohens. He was proud of the fact that with his sons and sons-in-law, aggregating, with himself, twenty-five, he could fulfil literally the commandment of the priestly benediction. His daughter Yocheved, who married Shabbethai ben Isaiah Hurwitz, became the ancestress of a family renowned for its learned men; and his son Gerson Katz was the progenitor of a noteworthy family of printers of that name.
