= Akiba (surname) =

Akiba (Japanese: 秋葉, lit. "autumn leaf") is a Japanese surname. Notable people with the surname include:

- Kenya Akiba (秋葉 賢也, born 1962), Japanese politician
- Masaru Akiba (秋葉 勝, born 1984), Japanese footballer
- Ryuji Akiba (秋葉 竜児, born 1984), Japanese footballer
- Tadahiro Akiba (秋葉 忠宏, born 1975), Japanese footballer and manager
- Tadatoshi Akiba (秋葉 忠利, born 1942), Japanese politician
- Takeshi Akiba (秋葉 武士, born 1944), Japanese ice hockey player
- Yoichi Akiba (秋葉 陽一, born 1983), Japanese footballer

== Other people ==
- David Akiba (born 1940), American photographer

== Fictional characters ==
- Hiroshi Akiba, character in the manga series Inubaka: Crazy for Dogs
