= Akiva Librecht =

Founder of Petah Tikva (1876–1958)

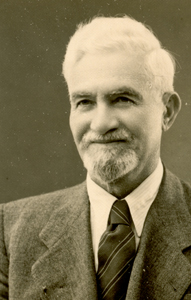
Akiva Librecht's Portrait

Akiva Librecht (Hebrew: עקיבא ליברכט; 1876 – March 3, 1958) was a founding member of Petah Tikva, Israel, and a member of its first council, which he headed in 1912–13. He was also a member of the Kfar Saba council.

Librecht was born in 1876 in Jerusalem, then in the Ottoman Empire. His father made Aliyah in the 1840s, and was one of the builders of the new Jewish neighborhoods of Jerusalem outside the Old City's walls. Akiva Librecht received a religious education, and also studied in Germany and Austria.

Librecht managed the winery in Petah Tikva, and built the first modern artificial beehives in the Land of Israel.

He was married to Shoshana Levit Gotlieb, with two children, David and Leah.
