= Akiva Baer ben Joseph =

Rabbi Akiva Baer ben Joseph

Personal life
- Born: Vienna, Holy Roman Empire
- Died: 1724 Gunzenhausen
- Buried: Jewish cemetery of Bechhofen
- Spouse: Y. Isserl
- Children: Joseph Akiva Baer Ben Simon Dayan
- Parent: Joseph Hanoks (father)
- Occupation: Rabbi and writer

Religious life
- Religion: Judaism
- Residence: Vienna, Burgpreppach, Zeckendorf, Schnaitach, Ansbach, Gunzenhausen

Shimon Akiva Baer ben Yosef of Vienna (Hebrew: שִׁמְעוֹן עֲקִיבָא בֵּער בֶּן יוֹסֵף; died 1724) was a 17th-century Viennese Talmudist and kabbalistic writer.

== Biography ==
Shimon Akiva Baer was born to Joseph Ḥanoks sometime in the 17th century. He was the nephew of Gerson Ashkenazi and David ben Isserles in Trebitsch, a relative of Aaron Teomim of Worms and Menaḥem Mendel Bacharach in Bamberg, and the son-in-law of Feitel Isserle of Vienna, rabbi of Kremsier. He was one of the refugees who, at the expulsion of the Jews from Vienna by Leopold I in 1670, went to Bavaria to promote Talmudical learning among their brethren in their new home. He supported himself by wandering from town to town through Bohemia and parts of Germany as a teacher, highly reputed for his Talmudic and kabbalistic knowledge, until becoming rabbi in Burgpreppach in 1688.

For six years he occupied the position of rabbi in the small community at Zeckendorf near Bamberg. He then accepted a call to the rabbinate of the large community of Schnaitach, extended to him through the influence of Chief Rabbi Baerman of Ansbach; but owing to the political turmoil he failed to find there the looked-for rest. Upon a false accusation he was cast into prison, but, being soon released, he left in 1694 and became rabbi of Gunzenhausen and assistant rabbi of his relative and benefactor, Rabbi Baerman at Ansbach, where he also won the friendship of Model Marx, the wealthy court Jew.

His son Joseph was rabbi of Schaffa and Gewitsch in Moravia, then rabbi of the schoolhouse at Cleves, and afterward assistant rabbi and assessor at the rabbinical court (Dayan) and printer in Amsterdam.

== Work ==
Akiva's reputation as author is due chiefly to a kabbalistic commentary on the daily prayers, entitled Avodat ha-Boreh ('Worship of the Creator'; Wilmersdorf, 1688), and divided into five sections corresponding with the five letters of his name (1688). The book met with such general approval that he felt encouraged to issue a second edition (Berlin, 1700), and finally an enlarged third edition, comprising also a commentary on Shabbat and holiday prayers (Sulzbach, 1707).

He also published with Isaac Seligman ben Meir Levi a small midrashic encyclopedia, based on the Midrashim Rabbot, under the title of Pi Shenayim ('A Double Share'; Sulzbach, 1702), printed by Aaron ben Uri—also a Vienna refugee and friend of Akiva.

Akiva was eminently a writer for the people, compiling rabbinical and kabbalistic legends in familiar Yiddish. Sefer Ma'asei Adonai ('Book of the Deeds of the Lord'; Frankfort-on-the-Main, 1691) and Avir Yaakov ('Protector of Jacob'; Sulzbach, 1700), both compiled and translated by him, consist of Yiddish and Hebrew translations of kabbalistic materials from a variety of sources, from the Zohar to Shivhei ha-Ari, a book of hagiographic legends about Isaac Luria. He published a second volume of his Sefer Ma'asei Adonai in 1694.
