= Akiba Dam =

Dam in Shizuoka Prefecture, Japan

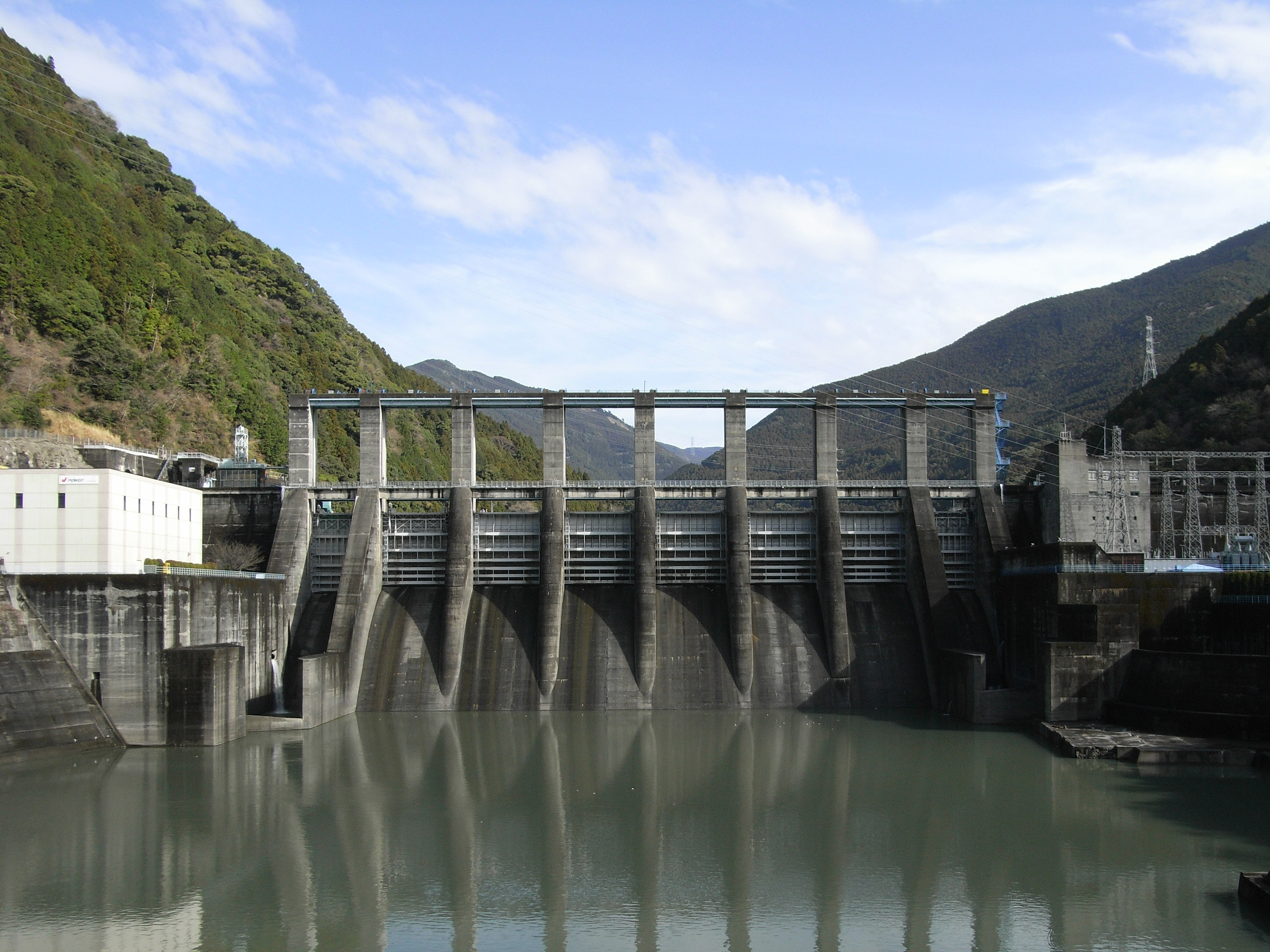
- Interactive map of Akiba Dam
- Official name: 秋葉ダム
- Location: Shizuoka Prefecture, Japan
- Coordinates: 34°58′20″N 137°49′42″E
- Construction began: 1954
- Opening date: 1958
- Operator: Electric Power Development Company

Dam and spillways
- Type of dam: Gravity
- Impounds: Tenryū River
- Height: 89 m (292 ft)
- Length: 273.4 m (897 ft)

Reservoir
- Creates: Akiba Reservoir
- Total capacity: 34,703,000 m^{3} (1.2255×10^{9} cu ft)
- Catchment area: 4,490 km^{2} (1,730 sq mi)
- Surface area: 190 ha (470 acres)

Akiba Daiichi, Daini and Daisan hydroelectric power plants
- Operator: J-Power
- Installed capacity: 46,250 kW (Akiba Daiichi) 34,900 kW (Akiba Daini); 46,900 kW (Akiba Daisan) 128,000 kW (total)

The Akiba Dam (秋葉ダム, Akiba damu) is a dam on the Tenryū River, located in Tenryū-ku, Hamamatsu, Shizuoka Prefecture on the island of Honshū, Japan.

== History ==
The potential of the Tenryū River valley for hydroelectric power development was realized by the Meiji government at the start of the 20th century. The Tenryū River was characterized by a high volume of flow and a fast current. Its mountainous upper reaches and tributaries were areas of steep valleys and abundant rainfall, and were sparsely populated. However, the bulk of investment in hydroelectric power generation in the region was centered on the Ōi River, and it was not until the Taishō period that development began on the Tenryū River. Private entrepreneur Fukuzawa Momosuke founded the Tenryūgawa Electric Power (天竜川電力, Tenryūgawa Denroku), which later became Yasaku Hydroelectric (矢作水力電気, Yasaku Suiroku Denki) before it was nationalized into the pre-war government monopoly Japan Electric Generation and Transmission Company (日本発送電株式会社, Nippon Hassoden K.K.) in 1938. The first dams on the main stream of the Tenryū River were built in Nagano Prefecture. To develop of the hydroelectric potential of the river in Shizuoka Prefecture, the post-war Japanese government turned to the Electric Power Development Company. The new company, in part through foreign aid loans from the United Nations, and with the use of new dam technologies completed the huge Sakuma Dam in the 1956, at the time the 10th largest in the world. The Akiba Dam was designed as a pumped-storage hydroelectricity facility, with the discharge from Sakuma Dam discharging through a penstock into a lake created by the smaller Akiba Dam downstream. The reversible turbine generators at the Sakuma power plant were designed to function as either electrical power generators, or as pumps, to reverse the flow of water back into the reservoir in times of low demand. Construction began in 1954 and was completed in 1958 by the Kumagai Gumi.

== Design ==
The Akiba Dam is a hollow-core concrete gravity dam with several central spillways. It supplies water to the nearby Akiba No. 1 Hydroelectric Power Station, with a rated capacity of 45,300 kW, and to the Akiba No. 2 Hydroelectric Power Station, with a rated capacity of 34,900 kW. A third station, the Akiba No. 3 Hydroelectric Power Station was added in 1989 with a rated capacity of 46,900 kW. The Akiba Dam was designed as a multipurpose dam. In addition to hydroelectric power generation, the dam provides industrial water to the city of Hamamatsu, and water for irrigation to a large area of eastern Shizuoka Prefecture.

However, as with other dams on the Tenryū and Ōi rivers, the dam has been rapidly filling with sand and silt from the mountains upstream, and the reduction of the amount of sand and silt reaching the river mouth has caused problems with coastal erosion.

== Surroundings ==
The Akiba Dam Reservoir is a popular attraction for canoeing and camping, due to its proximity to downtown Hamamatsu as well as the Akihasan Hongū Akiha Jinja, and it is located within the boundaries of the Tenryū-Okumikawa Quasi-National Park.
