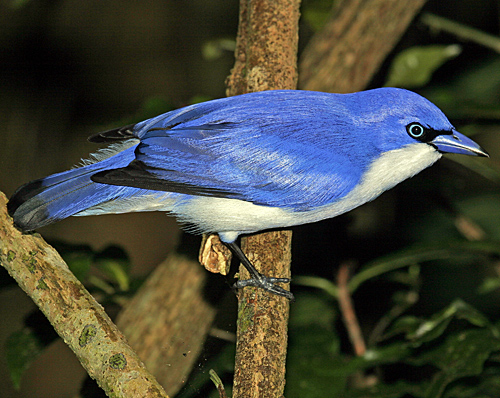

Conservation status
- Least Concern (IUCN 3.1)

Scientific classification
- Kingdom: Animalia
- Phylum: Chordata
- Class: Aves
- Order: Passeriformes
- Family: Vangidae
- Genus: Cyanolanius
- Species: C. madagascarinus

Binomial name
- Cyanolanius madagascarinus (Linnaeus, 1766)

Synonyms
- Loxia madagascarina Linnaeus, 1766

= Madagascar blue vanga =

Species of bird

The Madagascar blue vanga (Cyanolanius madagascarinus) is a bird species in the family Vangidae. It is found in Madagascar, where its natural habitats are subtropical or tropical dry forest and subtropical or tropical moist lowland forest.

== Taxonomy and systematics ==
In 1760, the French zoologist Mathurin Jacques Brisson included a description of the blue vanga in his Ornithologie based on a specimen collected on the island of Madagascar. He used the French name Le pie-griesche bleu de Madagascar and the Latin name Lanius Madagascariensis coeruleus. Although Brisson coined Latin names, these do not conform to the binomial system and are not recognised by the International Commission on Zoological Nomenclature. When the Swedish naturalist Carl Linnaeus updated his Systema Naturae for the twelfth edition in 1766, he added 240 species that had been previously described by Brisson. One of these was the blue vanga. Linnaeus included a brief description, coined the binomial name Loxia madagascarina and cited Brisson's work. The species is now placed in the genus Cyanolanius that was introduced by the French naturalist Charles Lucien Bonaparte in 1854.

== Description ==
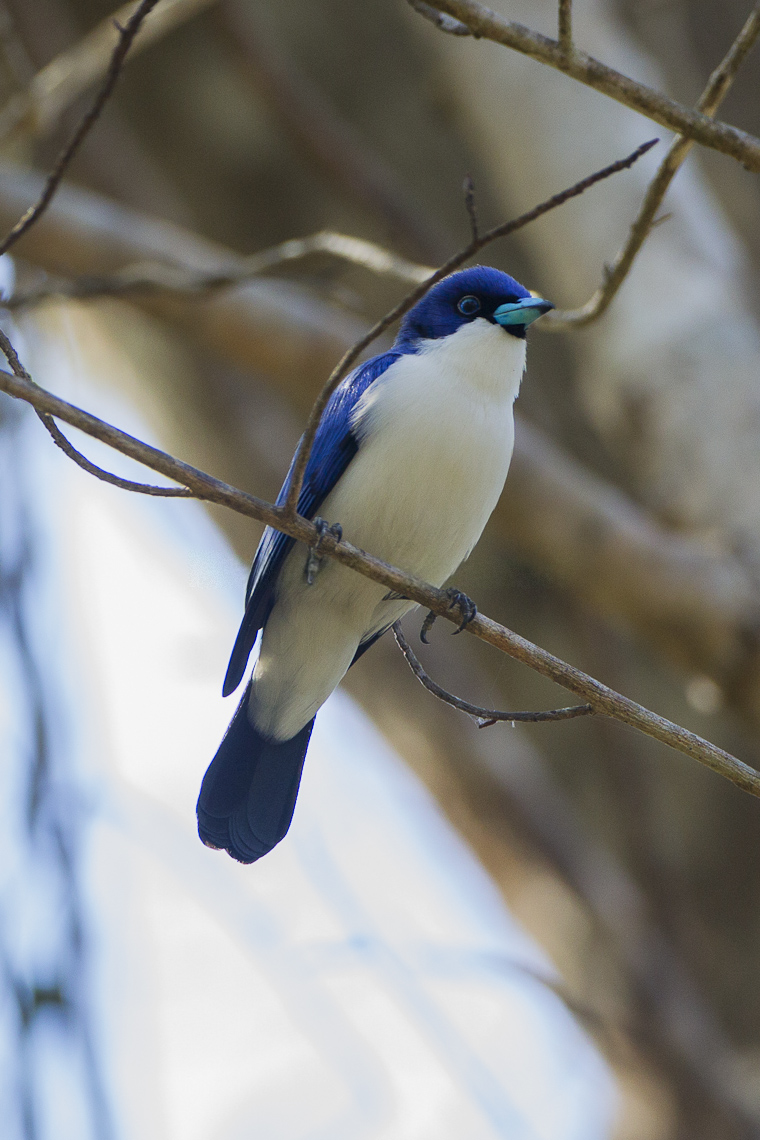
Adult male blue vanga.

The blue vanga is 16–19 cm (6.3–7.5 in) long and weighs 19.5–25.5 g (0.69–0.90 oz).

Adult males are bright blue in color, with a black line through the eye which extends to base of the bill, as well as above and below the bill. It has a paler blue eye-ring. The tail as well as edges and tips of the wings are black in colour. The underparts and throat are bright white in colour. Females tend to be slightly duller in colour than males, with the underparts also being off-white in colour with a pale orange or light buffy wash. The wings are slightly tinged greenish.

Juveniles have a grayish-blue head, with the rest of the upperparts being dark greenish olive. Their tail is similar in appearance to an adult female's, but has a duller green-blue pattern. The throat is dirty-white in colour, the rest of the underparts being olive-buff.

C. madagarensis has a vivid pale or cold blue beak, with a dark tip and cutting edges in adult males, and a dark brown with similar pattern in adult female. Juveniles have a black bill with pale pink base. The iris is sky-blue or greenish blue in males, and brown in females and juveniles. The legs are black in male and gray in females.

=== Vocalisations ===
Calls are described as a very characteristic tcccch, which is sometimes repeated to form a chrr-crrk-crrk-crrrrk-crk-crk, similar to the chabert vanga's call. The song can be faster or slower, and the first note is usually of a higher pitch. They also make a teea teea teea or a harsh scheet, which is thought to be an alarm call. Race comorensis has similar calls, but also makes a grating erch-chhh-crkk-chh-chhh-chhh-crrk or a harsher crew-crew-crew.

== Behaviour and ecology ==
=== Diet ===
Mainly feeds on insects, including beetles, crickets, cicadas, caterpillars, as well as spiders. They also occasionally feed upon berries. Birds on Mohéli have been recorded eating fruit.

It forages in the middle and upper levels of trees. Feeding often occurs while hanging upside down from its feet. Most food is gleaned from the substrate, and it also sally-gleans from branches and leaves. It usually forages in groups of up to 6 birds n the non-breeding season, and in pairs while nesting. It has also been observed foraging in mixed-species flocks throughout its range.

=== Breeding ===
The breeding season is thought to be from October–December. Juveniles are taken care of by both sexes. The observed nests were placed around 12 m (39 ft) above the ground, near a fork between near-vertical, slender branches. The nest is cup-shaped, and made out of fine twigs and a pale down-like material.

Eggs are pale blue to green and have mid-sized lilac-gray to red-brown speckles, which are the densest at the larger end. They are 19.9–21.2 × 15.8–16.2 mm in size.

== Distribution ==
The species is found in northern, eastern, and western Madagascar. It inhabits the midstory and canopy of deciduous dry forests in the western part of its range, and evergreen humid forest in the west. It has also been observed in littoral forests, the adjacent second growth, and even in mangroves. It occurs up to an elevation of 1,200 m (3,900 ft), although it has been reported up to elevations of 1,600 m (5,200 ft).

== Status ==
The nominate race on Madagascar faces few threats due to its large range and population. It is classified by the IUCN Red List as least concern.
