= Akiva Tatz =

South African Orthodox rabbi

- Born: Johannesburg, South Africa
- Education: University of the Witwatersrand, Washington University School of Medicine
- Occupations: Orthodox rabbi, Medical practice
- Known for: Orthodox Jewish outreach
- Notable work: founder and director of the Jerusalem Medical Ethics Forum

Akiva Tatz is a prominent South African Orthodox rabbi, inspirational speaker and writer who is heavily involved in Orthodox Jewish outreach. He is also a doctor and expert in Jewish medical ethics.

== Biography ==
Rabbi Dr. Akiva Tatz was born in Johannesburg, South Africa. He graduated from the University of the Witwatersrand Medical School, graduating with distinction in surgery. He then spent a year in St. Louis, Missouri as an American Field Service Scholar and subsequently returned there for elective work in internal medicine at Washington University School of Medicine. He then served as a medical officer in the South African Defence Force and served in the Angolan Bush War. After practicing in both South Africa and the United States, he moved to Israel, and worked both in private practice as well as in a hospital setting in Jerusalem.

Not raised as an observant Jew, Tatz discovered Orthodox Judaism in adulthood and became a baal teshuva. He is currently on staff at the Jewish Learning Exchange and Ohr Somayach, and in the past has been a guest lecturer at Gateways. Rabbi Tatz gives lectures to Jewish student groups and organisations across the UK, including an annual medical ethics lecture at University College London hosted by both the Jewish Society and Medical Ethics Society. He is also a regular lecturer on the Jewish Learning Exchange Genesis leadership programme. He has become a recognized expert in matters of Jewish thought and philosophy, which he covers in his authored texts. Zoketsu Norman Fischer, former abbot of the San Francisco Zen Center and founder of and teacher at the Everyday Zen Foundation, describes Tatz's work, Letters to a Buddhist Jew, as "a fascinating book - the most serious contribution in this field to date."

Tatz is both the founder and director of the Jerusalem Medical Ethics Forum, whose purpose is to promote knowledge of Jewish medical ethics internationally, giving lectures worldwide in Jewish thought and medical ethics, as well as on modern applications in medicine.

== Works ==
Tatz's works have been translated into Spanish, French and Portuguese Hebrew and Russian:

- Anatomy of a Search (ArtScroll, 1987)
- Living Inspired (Targum Press, 1993)
- Worldmask (Targum Press, 1995)
- The Thinking Jewish Teenager's Guide to Life (Targum Press, 1999)
- Letters to a Buddhist Jew (Targum Press, 2004)
- Dangerous Disease and Dangerous Therapy in Jewish Medical Ethics (Targum Press, 2010)
- Will, Freedom, and Destiny (Targum Press, 2014)
- As Dawn Ends The Night (Targum Press, 2018)
