= Malkoha =

Genus of birds

Malkohas are large birds in the cuckoo family Cuculidae. The group name is derived from the Sinhala word for the red-faced malkoha; mal-koha meaning flower-cuckoo. These are all tropical species.

Image	Scientific name	Common name	Distribution
	Rhinortha chlorophaea	Raffles's malkoha	Malay Pen., Sumatra, and Borneo

Image	Scientific name	Common name	Distribution
	Ceuthmochares aereus	Blue malkoha	western and central Africa
	Ceuthmochares australis	Green malkoha	Ethiopia and Somalia to Mozambique and South Africa

Image	Scientific name	Common name	Distribution
	Taccocua leschenaultii	Sirkeer malkoha	Pakistan, India and Sri Lanka

Image	Scientific name	Common name	Distribution
	Zanclostomus javanicus	Red-billed malkoha	Malay Pen. and Greater Sundas

Image	Scientific name	Common name	Distribution
	Rhamphococcyx calyorhynchus	Yellow-billed malkoha	Sulawesi

Image	Scientific name	Common name	Distribution
	Phaenicophaeus diardi	Black-bellied malkoha	Brunei, Indonesia, Malaysia, Myanmar, Singapore, and Thailand.
	Phaenicophaeus sumatranus	Chestnut-bellied malkoha	Brunei, Indonesia, Malaysia, Myanmar, Singapore, and Thailand.
	Phaenicophaeus viridirostris	Blue-faced malkoha	peninsular India and Sri Lanka.
	Phaenicophaeus tristis	Green-billed malkoha	Indian Subcontinent and Southeast Asia
	Phaenicophaeus curvirostris	Chestnut-breasted malkoha	Southeast Asia from Myanmar through to eastern Java, the Philippines and Borneo
	Phaenicophaeus pyrrhocephalus	Red-faced malkoha	Sri Lanka

Image	Scientific name	Common name	Distribution
	Dasylophus superciliosus	Rough-crested malkoha	northern Philippines
	Dasylophus cumingi	Scale-feathered malkoha	northern Philippines
