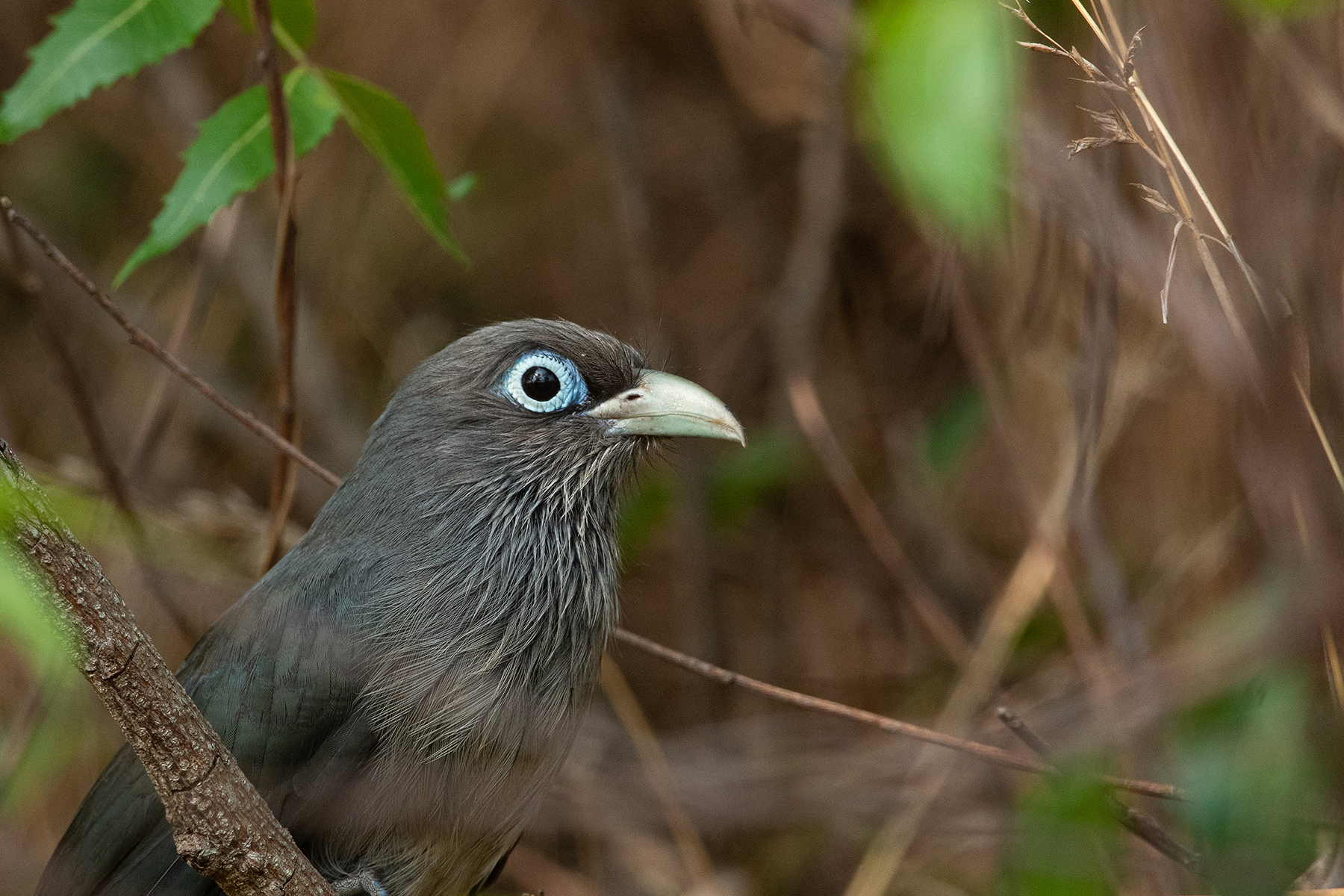
- Blue-faced Malkoha from Mysore, Karnataka, India

Conservation status
- Least Concern (IUCN 3.1)

Scientific classification
- Kingdom: Animalia
- Phylum: Chordata
- Class: Aves
- Order: Cuculiformes
- Family: Cuculidae
- Genus: Phaenicophaeus
- Species: P. viridirostris

Binomial name
- Phaenicophaeus viridirostris (Jerdon, 1840)

= Blue-faced malkoha =

Species of bird

The blue-faced malkoha (Phaenicophaeus viridirostris) or small green-billed malkoha, is a non-parasitic cuckoo found in the scrub and deciduous forests of peninsular India and Sri Lanka. It has a waxy, dark, blue-grey plumage on its upperparts and has a long tail with graduated white-tipped feathers. The throat and chin are dark with spiny pale feathers that are branched. The lower belly is a dull creamy to rufous colour. The bill is apple green, and a naked patch of blue skin surrounds the eye. The sexes are alike. The blue-faced malkoha is a bird of open forests and scrub jungle.

== Description ==
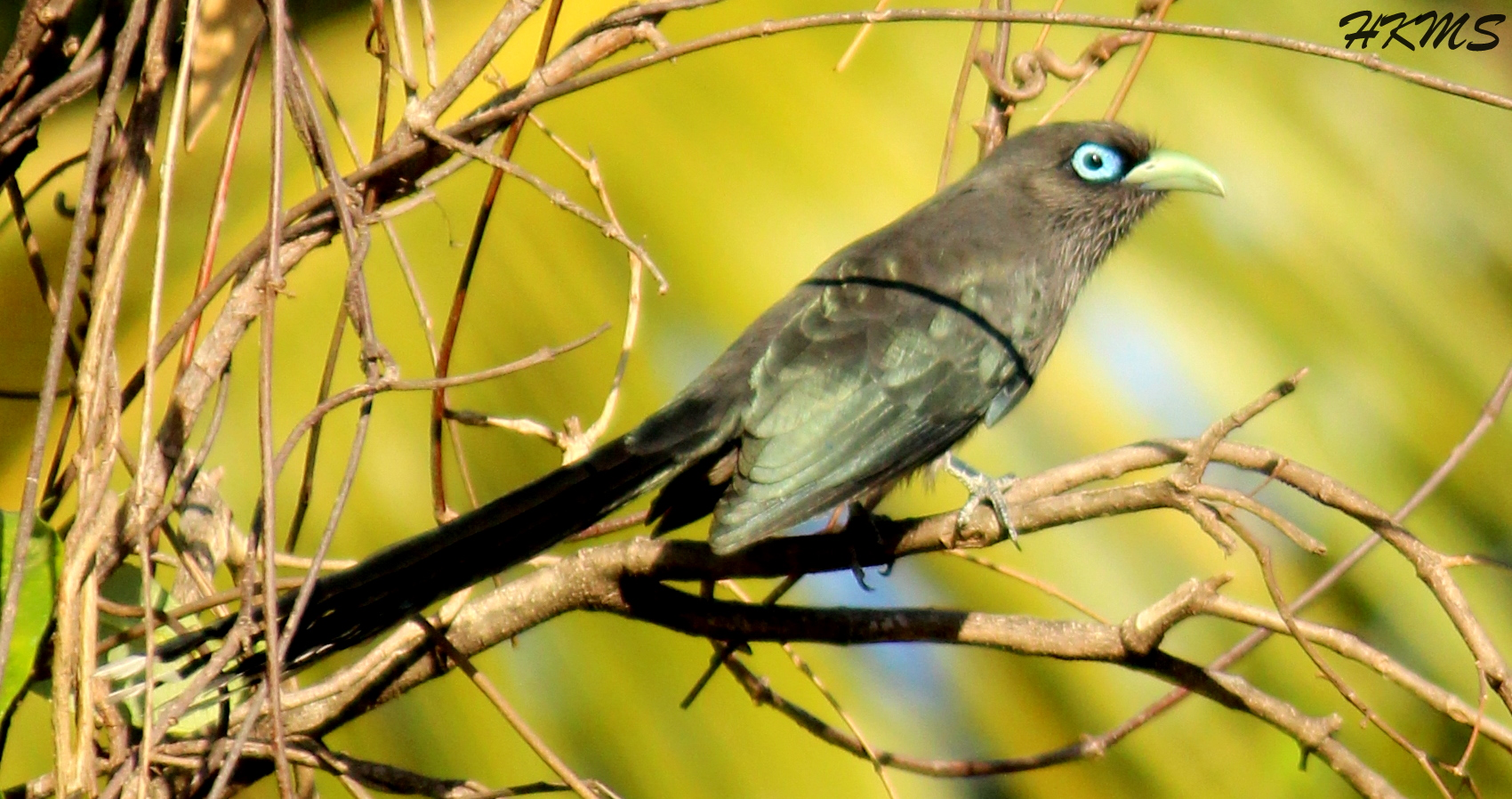
Like all cuckoos, malkohas have zygodactyle feet, two toes pointing forward and two to the back.

A largish species at 39 cm, its back and head are dark grey with an oily green or blue gloss, and the dark tail has graduated feathers tipped with white. The belly is pale ochre to grey. The feathers of the chin and throat are branched (unlike in Phaenicophaeus tristis) with the branched tips being pointed and slightly yellowish giving the throat a streaked and spiny appearance. There is a large blue patch around the eye, with a white fringed red iris, and the bill is apple green. The sexes are indistinguishable by external appearance. Birds from Sri Lanka have a broader white tip to the tail feathers. Malkohas are generally very silent but will sometimes produce a low croaky kraa when flushed. Young birds have dull and non glossy upperparts and some brown feathers in their wing.

They nest within a thorny bush, building a thick platform of twigs lined with green leaves and lay a clutch of two, rarely three, chalky white eggs. The breeding season is somewhat extended and unclear but many nest have been taken from March to August. Two out of 31 specimens trapped in a study were found to have ticks of the genus Haemaphysalis spinigera.

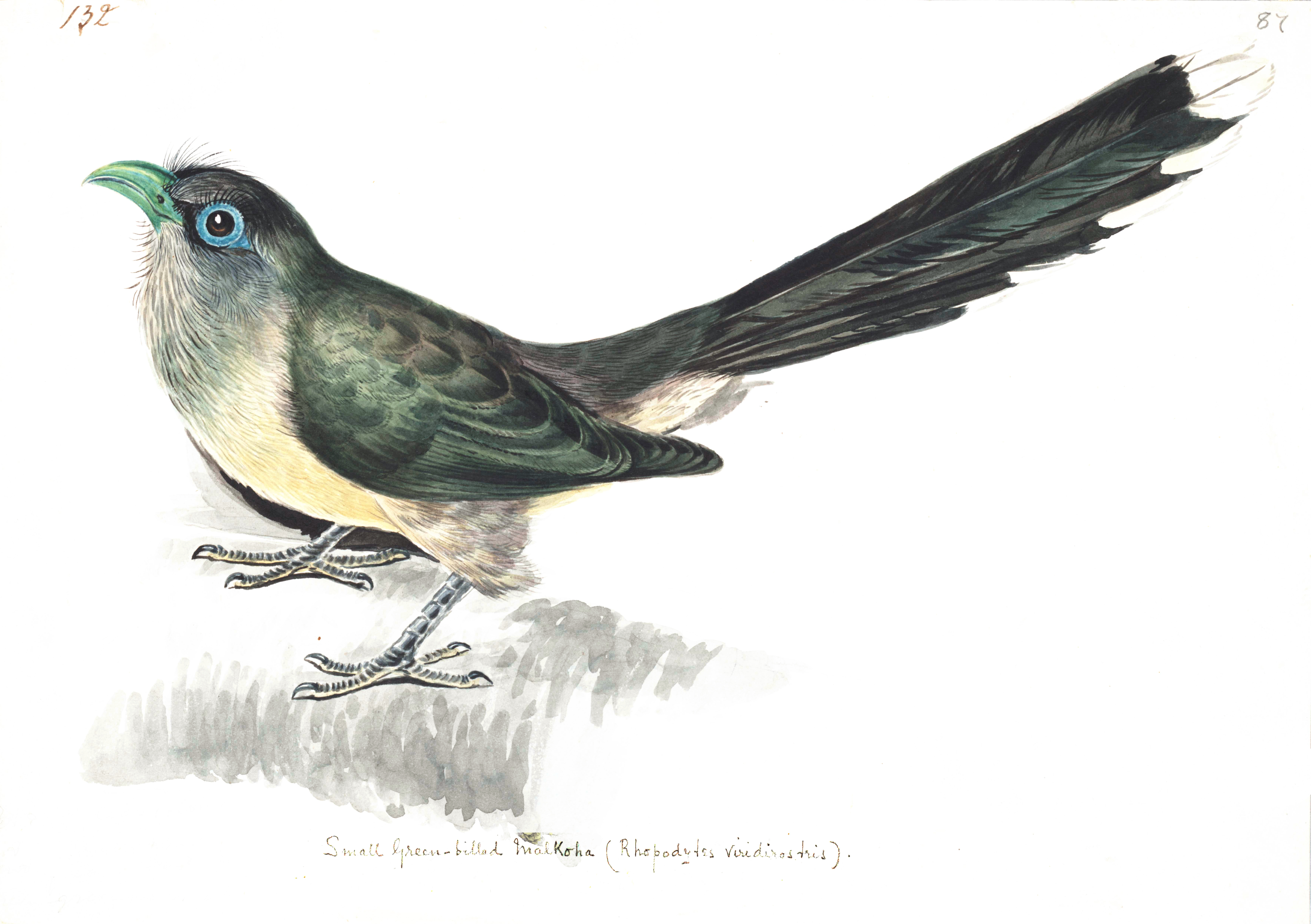
A painting of the blue-faced malkoha by Lady Elizabeth Gwillim (1763–1807), made before the bird had been given its scientific name

The blue-faced malkoha takes a variety of insects, caterpillars and small vertebrates. It usually forages in the undergrowth.

== Taxonomy ==
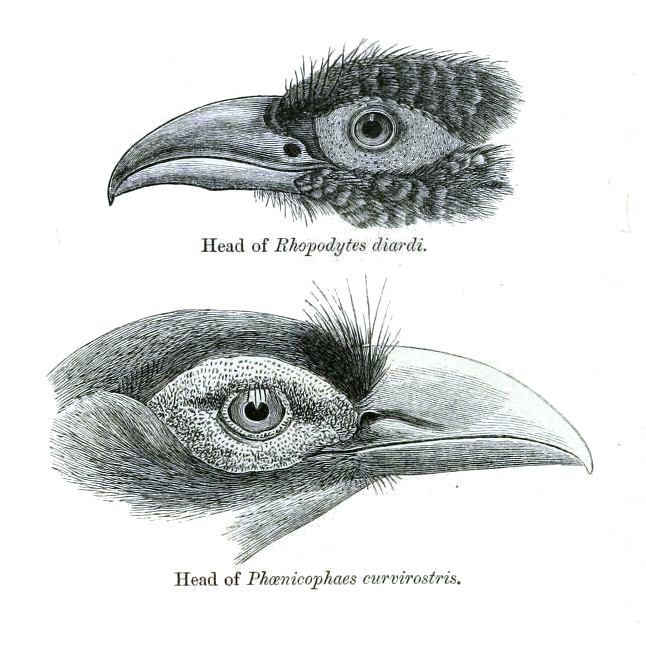
The nostril shapes used to separate Rhopodytes and Phaenicophaeus

The species was described in 1840 by T.C. Jerdon based on a specimen that he collected at the base of Coonoor ghats. He placed it in the genus Zanclostomus but saw affinities to Phaenicophaeus. A year earlier T.C. Eyton described a species from Malaya that he called Phaenicophaeus viridirostris but that referred to a female of the already described Phaenicophaeus chlorophaeus. The species is included in the genus Phaenicophaeus although it was formerly placed in Rhopodytes as the two genera were separated on the basis of the shape of the nostril, round in Rhopodytes and slit in Phaenicophaeus but Rhopodytes was subsequently subsumed into the older genus name Phaenicophaeus. A study of the aortic arches of birds found that this species has a peculiar modification in the two dorsal carotids are reduced to paired ligaments "ligamenti ottleyi" which enter the hypapophysial canal. The genus is placed in the subfamily Phaenicophaeinae.

== Distribution ==
The blue-faced malkoha is found in peninsular India south of Baroda (the Surat Dangs) and Cuttack in a range of habitats from semi-evergreen, dry deciduous and open scrub forest. In Sri Lanka it is restricted to the plains. This bird has been recorded in Trichy district of Tamilnadu, india
