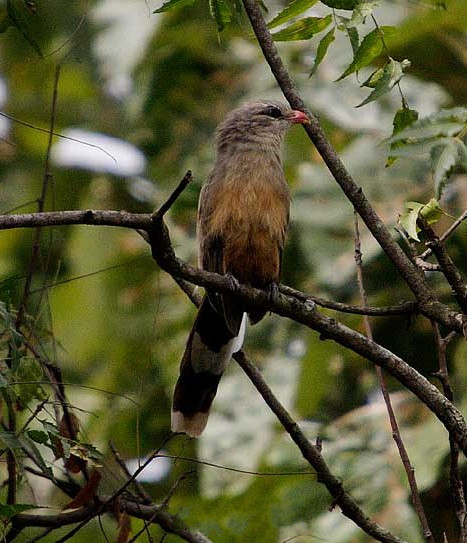
- T. l. leschenaultii (From Bangalore)

Conservation status
- Least Concern (IUCN 3.1)

Scientific classification
- Kingdom: Animalia
- Phylum: Chordata
- Class: Aves
- Order: Cuculiformes
- Family: Cuculidae
- Genus: Taccocua; Lesson, 1830
- Species: T. leschenaultii

Binomial name
- Taccocua leschenaultii Lesson, 1830

Subspecies
- T. l. sirkee (Gray, 1831); T. l. infuscata Blyth, 1845; T. l. leschenaultii Lesson, 1830

Synonyms
- Phaenicophaeus leschenaultii; Zanclostomus sirkee

= Sirkeer malkoha =

Species of bird

The sirkeer malkoha or sirkeer cuckoo (Taccocua leschenaultii), is a non-parasitic cuckoo found in dry scrub forest and open woodland habitats in the Indian subcontinent. The species is long-tailed, largely olive brown on the upper side with a distinctive curved red beak tipped in yellow. They forage singly or in pairs mainly on or close to the ground creeping between grasses and bushes, often on rocky habitats where they feed on small lizards, insects, and sometimes berries and seeds. They are very silent and the sexes are identical in plumage.

== Description ==
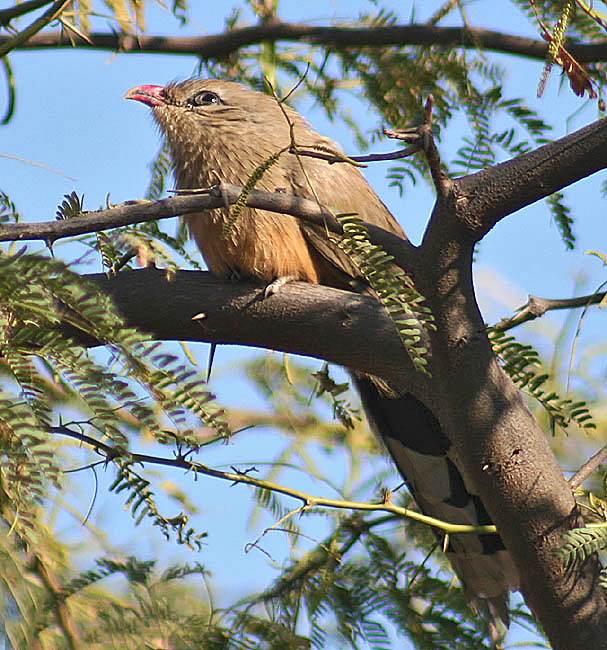
The narrow white streak over the eye is visible. (In Bharatpur)

The sirkeer cuckoo is about 42–44 centimetres (16 1/2–17 1/4 in) long with dark olive brown on the back, wings and the central tail feathers. The underside is rufous. A greenish gloss is visible on the wing and dark parts of the tail feathers. The feathers have dark shafts which are especially prominent on the breast as streaks. The tail is graduated (with outer feathers being sequentially shorter) and tipped broadly in white. The upper tail coverts are long. The chin, throat and breast are pale. The most distinctive feature is the curved red bill with a yellow tip. The eyes have curved and long bristles around the eye but not behind it that resemble eyelashes (an adaptation to protect their eyes when creeping through grass and vegetation) and the iris is reddish brown. They have a short and pale whitish streak over and below the eye and a thin line of black feathers in line with the commissure of the bill that reaches under the eye. A dark bare patch of skin around the eye that tapers behind it exaggerates the size of the eye. The legs are grey.

They have zygodactyle feet and are forage on the ground, on rocks or between grass and bushes in scrub and thin forest, often in hilly ground but generally below an altitude of about 1500 m above sea level. They feed on caterpillars, insects and other invertebrates, small vertebrates, and on berries and seeds. When disturbed they creep through dense bushes and run on the ground almost appearing like a mongoose. Their flight is weak. They are normally very silent but produce a low buzzing zwik, or a sharp and repeated kik or kek sounds with a tone similar to the calls of a rose-ringed parakeet. The primaries at the wing tip from the longest to the shortest are 7>6>5>8>4>3>2>1>9>10. The primary moult is from August to December while the second moult occurs in April.

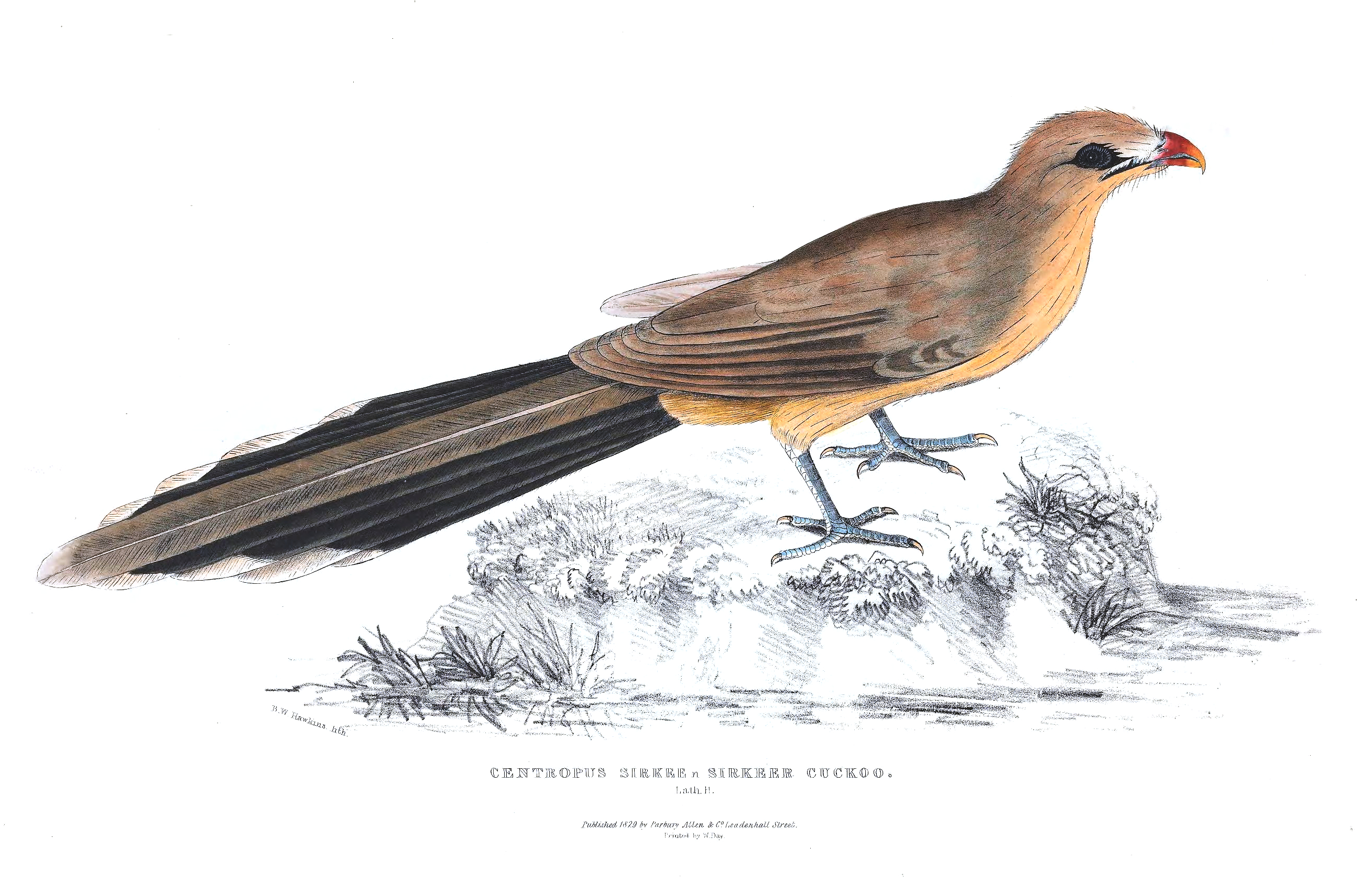
This illustration made by an Indian artist for General Thomas Hardwicke was used by Latham in his description of what is now the subspecies sirkee which was published by John Edward Gray in 1831.

The populations, P. l. sirkee in northwestern India (Rajasthan, Gujarat and Sind) are pale and have a yellowish throat and breast. The populations in the Eastern Himalayas are darker and larger and are considered to be a subspecies infuscata described by Edward Blyth (Latin scholars suggest it should be spelled infuscatus when used in the genus Phaenicophaeus). The nominate subspecies is intermediate in coloration and is distributed across Peninsular India and extends into Sri Lanka.

The species is placed in the genus Taccocua erected by Lesson in 1831 but some authors place it in the genus Phaenicophaeus. The genus Taccocua was separated from that of Rhopodytes (usually merged into Phaenicophaeus) by the bill being narrower at the base and the upper mandible being festooned at the base. The generic name is derived from the French word taco used for lizard cuckoos in the genus Coccyzus (earlier Saurothera) combined with the genus name Coua while the species epithet commemorates the French botanist Jean Baptiste Leschenault de la Tour while the name sirkeer has been claimed by James Jobling to be from the local name sirkee used for the bird in Gujarat although Blanford noted that the supposed Indian names Surkool or Sircea of Latham were untraceable. One theory is that they were often found in areas with reeds called sirkanda (Saccharum sp., possibly S. bengalense Retz.) in northern India from which mats used as curtains known as sirkee (sirkean in plural) were manufactured. Across much of northern India, it is known locally as junglee tota meaning 'jungle parrot' (or 'parakeet') based on the similarity of the bill to that of the locally familiar rose-ringed parakeet.

== Distribution ==
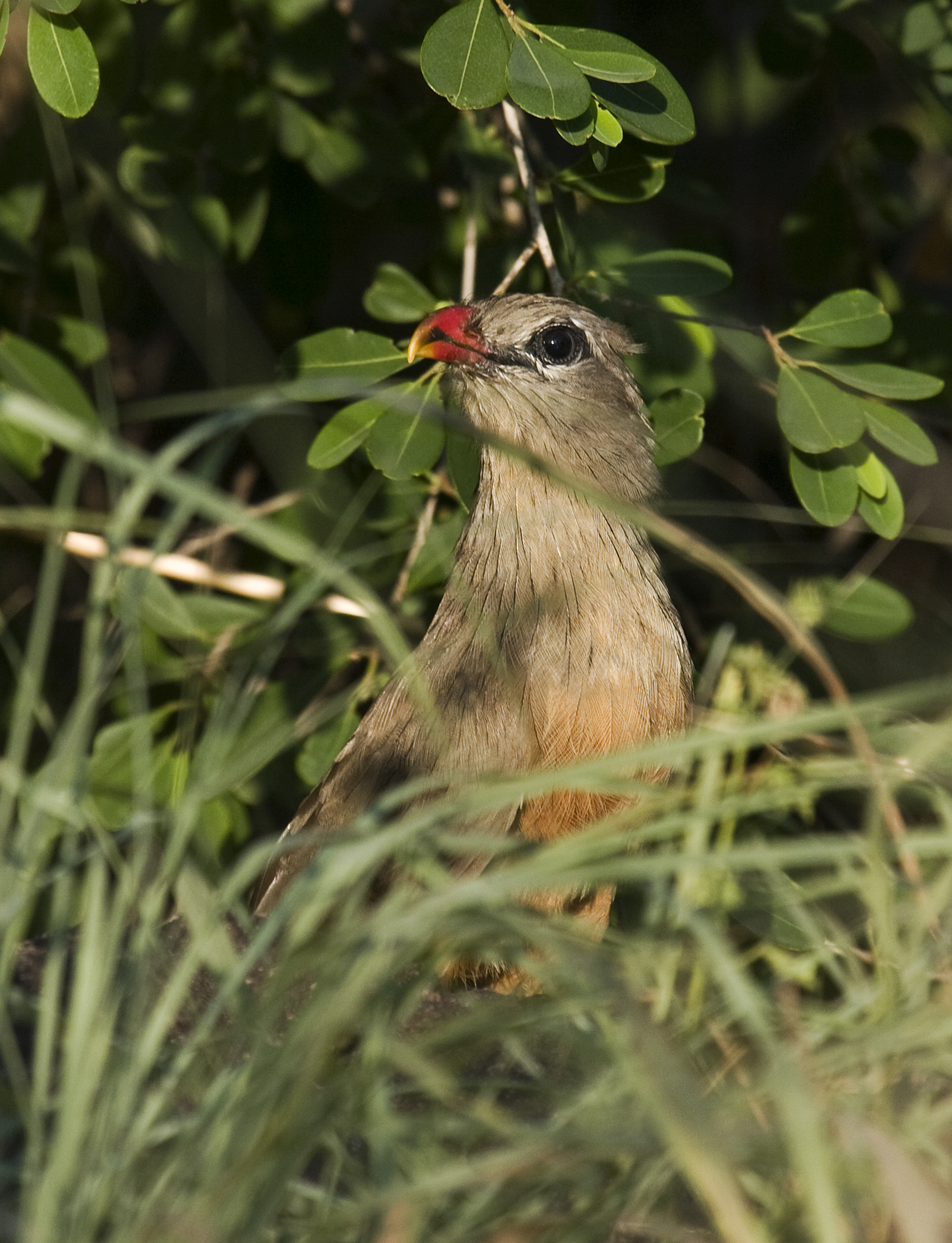
Sirkeer malkohas tend to skulk in vegetation and are often only briefly visible

All of the sub-Himalayan Indian subcontinent, Bangladesh, Sri Lanka; patchily in Pakistan and Rajasthan. They are thought to have expanded into the Sind region in the 1930s following the construction of the Sukkur barrage and the extension of canal irrigation. Three subspecies have been designated, varying in colouration but showing continuous variation and having no disjunctions in their distribution ranges.

== Breeding ==
This cuckoo, like other malkohas, is non-parasitic. The breeding season varies from March to August. Their courtship display involves pairs bowing with the tail splayed wide, held upright and looking like an open fan. The plumage is puffed out and the bowing is followed by raising their head high and holding the bill upward for a few seconds. The bills are held open during the display and the pairs produce clicking sounds. The nest is a broad saucer of twigs placed in a low bush or tree and lined with green leaves. The clutch is two to three eggs which are pale yellowish brown with a glaze that is lost when washed. Both sexes incubate but the period is undocumented.
