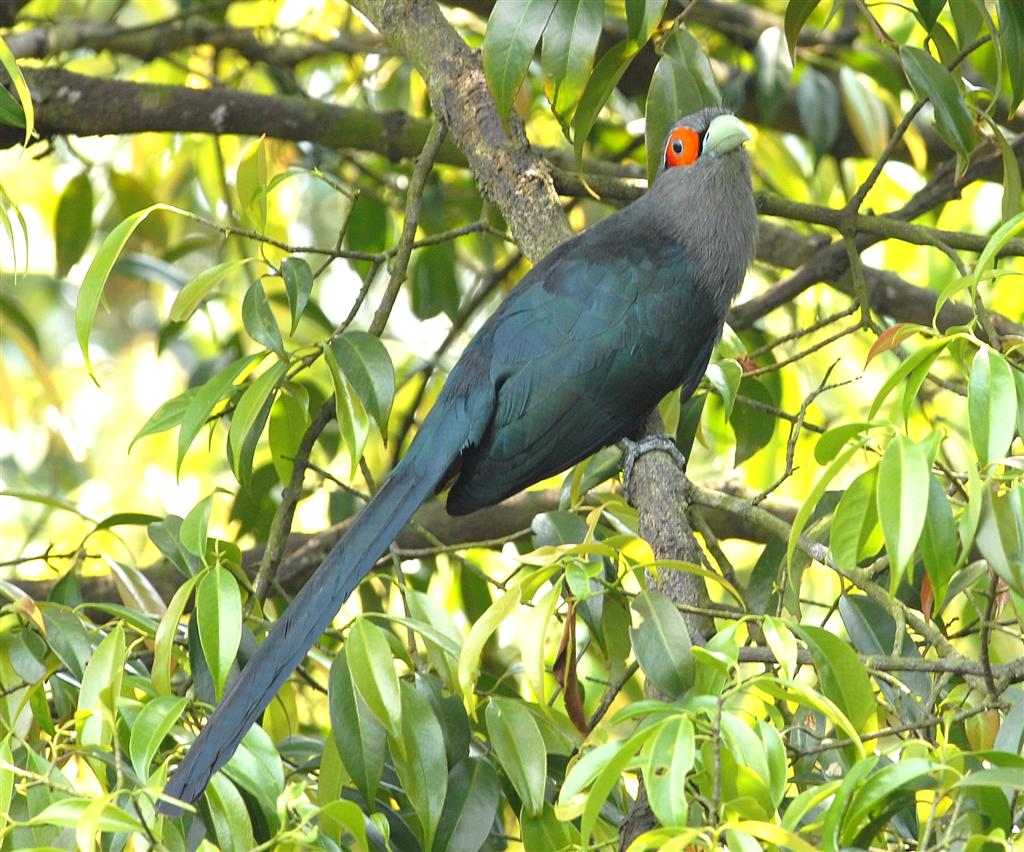

Conservation status
- Near Threatened (IUCN 3.1)

Scientific classification
- Kingdom: Animalia
- Phylum: Chordata
- Class: Aves
- Order: Cuculiformes
- Family: Cuculidae
- Genus: Phaenicophaeus
- Species: P. sumatranus

Binomial name
- Phaenicophaeus sumatranus (Raffles, 1822)

= Chestnut-bellied malkoha =

Species of bird

The chestnut-bellied malkoha (Phaenicophaeus sumatranus) is a species of cuckoo in the family Cuculidae. It is found in Brunei, Indonesia, Malaysia, Myanmar, Singapore, and Thailand. Its natural habitats are subtropical or tropical moist lowland forest, subtropical or tropical mangrove forest, and subtropical or tropical swampland. It is threatened by habitat loss.

Not to be confused with the chestnut-breasted malkoha.

== Description ==
The plumage on its mantle is dark green and glossy, while that of its throat, breast, and crown are gray. The underside of its wings are green and yellow.

== Diet ==
The chestnut-bellied malkoha feeds on fruit, seeds, flowers, and leaf buds.
