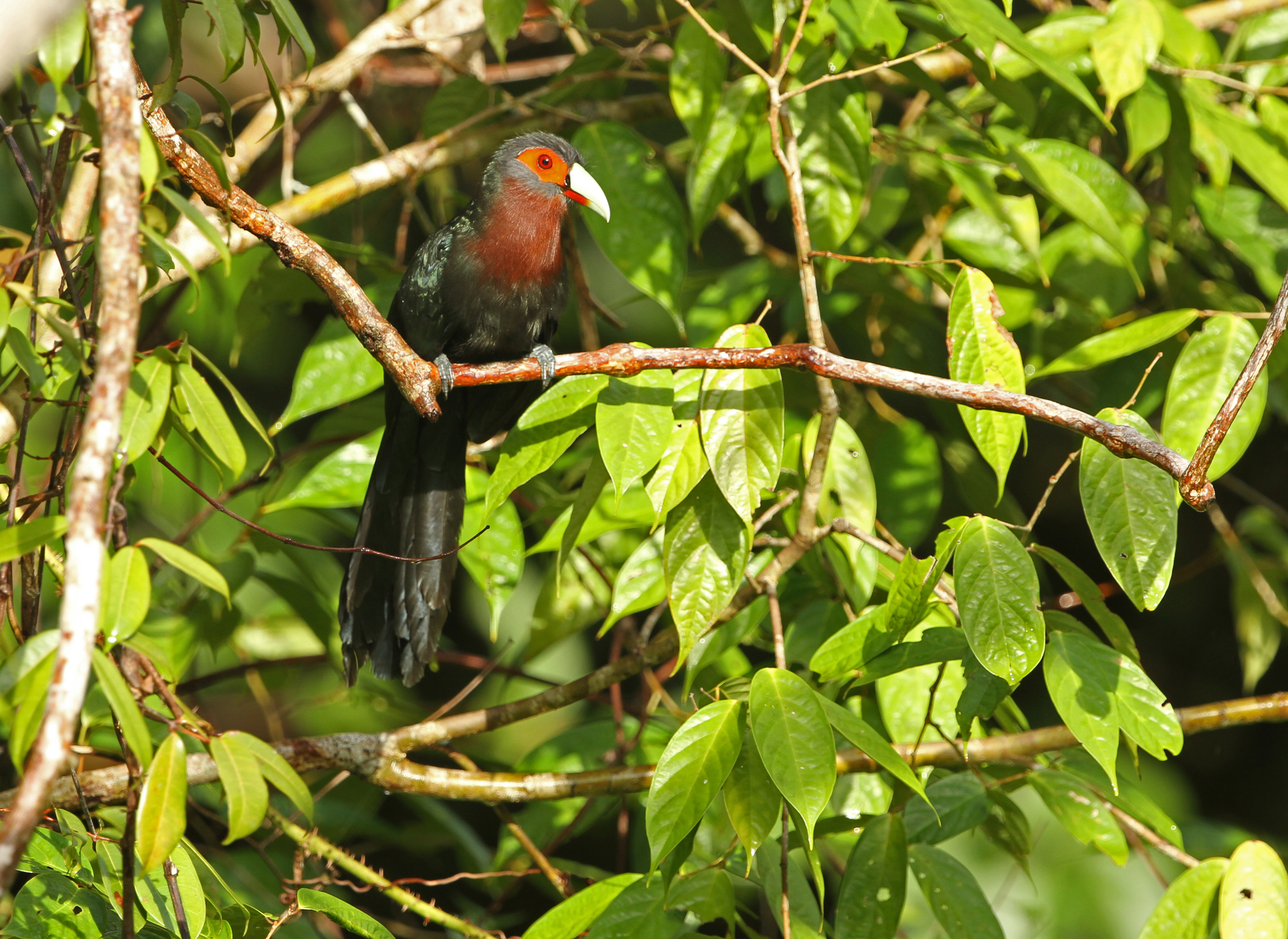

Conservation status
- Least Concern (IUCN 3.1)

Scientific classification
- Kingdom: Animalia
- Phylum: Chordata
- Class: Aves
- Order: Cuculiformes
- Family: Cuculidae
- Genus: Phaenicophaeus
- Species: P. oeneicaudus

Binomial name
- Phaenicophaeus oeneicaudus Verreaux, J & Verreaux, É, 1855

= Mentawai malkoha =

Species of bird

The Mentawai malkoha (Phaenicophaeus oeneicaudus) is a species of cuckoo in the family Cuculidae. It is endemic to the Mentawai Islands off the west of Sumatra. It was formerly considered to be conspecific with the chestnut-breasted malkoha.

== Taxonomy ==
The Mentawai malkoha was formally described in 1855 by the French naturalists Jules and Édouard Verreaux under the current binomial name Phaenicophaeus oeneicaudus. They believed that their specimen had come from Ceylon (now Sri Lanka). The Italian zoologist Tommaso Salvadori realised that this was an error and the specimen must instead have come from the Mentawai Islands which lie in the Indian Ocean approximately 150 km (93 mi) off the western coast of Sumatra. The genus name Phaenicophaeus is from Ancient Greek φοινικοφαης (phoinikophaēs) meaning "of crimson appearance" or "red-gleaming". The specific epithet oeneicaudus combines the Latin oenoo- meaning "wine" and cauda meaning "tail". The Mentawai malkoha was formerly treated as a subspecies of the chestnut-breasted malkoha (Phaenicophaeus curvirostris). It was promoted to species status based on the morphological differences.
