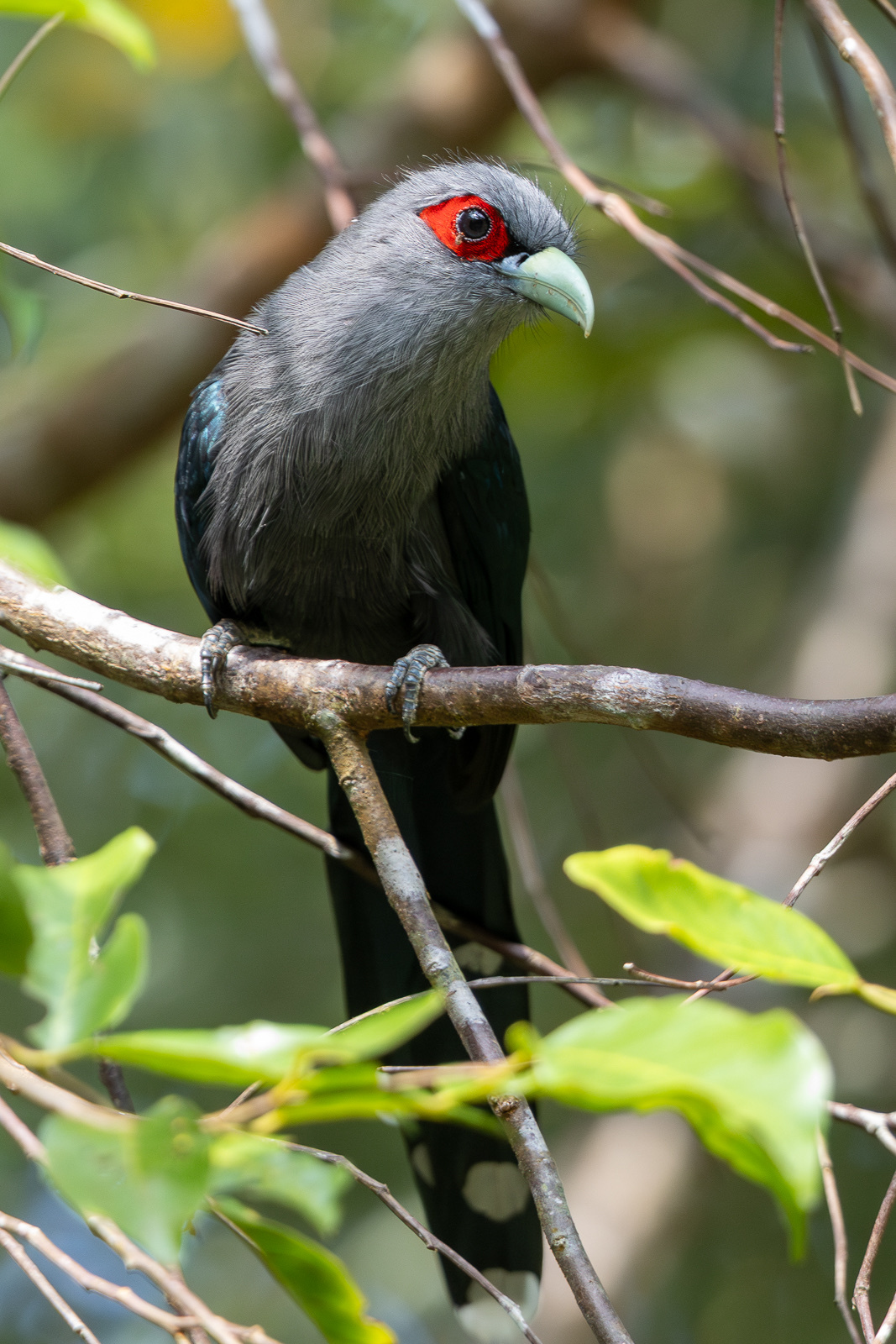

Conservation status
- Near Threatened (IUCN 3.1)

Scientific classification
- Kingdom: Animalia
- Phylum: Chordata
- Class: Aves
- Order: Cuculiformes
- Family: Cuculidae
- Genus: Phaenicophaeus
- Species: P. diardi

Binomial name
- Phaenicophaeus diardi (Lesson, 1830)

= Black-bellied malkoha =

Species of bird

The black-bellied malkoha (Phaenicophaeus diardi) is a species of malkoha in the family Cuculidae. It is found in Brunei, Indonesia, Malaysia, Myanmar, Singapore, and Thailand. Its natural habitats are subtropical or tropical moist lowland forests, including mango trees, and subtropical or tropical mangrove forests. It is threatened by habitat loss.

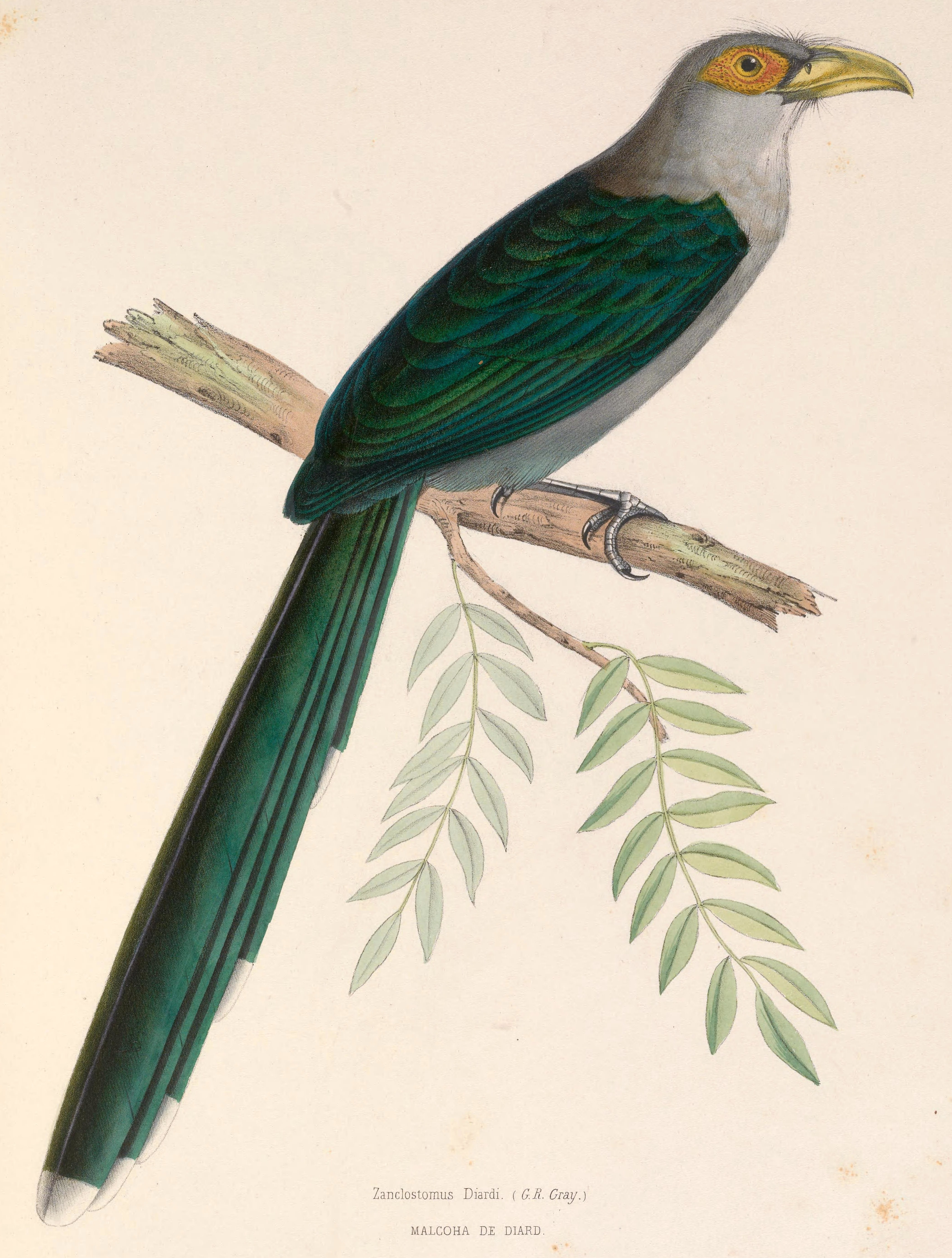
1849 illustration of black-bellied malkoha from Iconographie ornithologique
