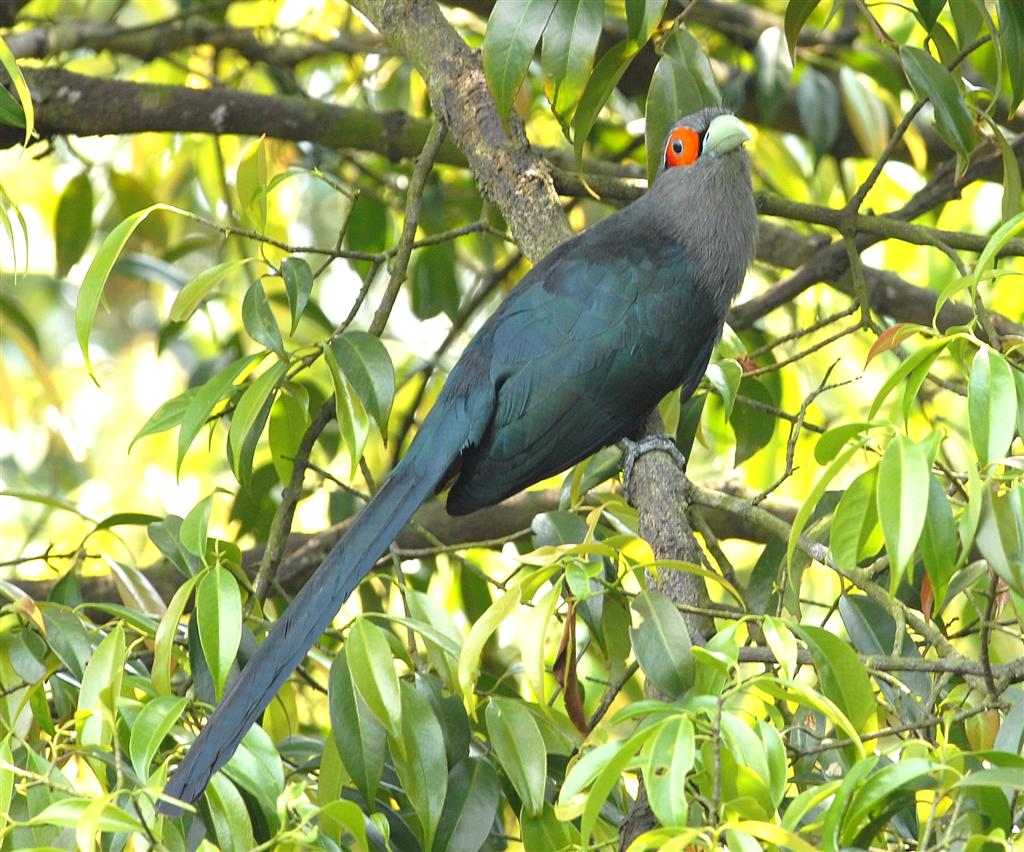
- Chestnut-bellied malkoha (Phaenicophaeus sumatranus)

Scientific classification
- Kingdom: Animalia
- Phylum: Chordata
- Class: Aves
- Order: Cuculiformes
- Family: Cuculidae
- Genus: Phaenicophaeus; Stephens, 1815

Type species
- Cuculus pyrrhocephalus Pennant, 1769

= Phaenicophaeus =

Genus of birds

Phaenicophaeus is a genus of seven species of cuckoos in the family Cuculidae that are found in South and Southeast Asia.

== Taxonomy ==
The genus Phaenicophaeus was introduced in 1815 by the English naturalist James Francis Stephens. He included three species in the genus but in 1940 James L. Peters designated one of these, Cuculus pyrrhocephalus Pennant, 1769 (the red-faced malkoha), as the type species. The genus name is from Ancient Greek φοινικοφαης (phoinikophaēs) meaning "of crimson appearance" or "red-gleaming".

== Species ==
The genus contains seven species.

Genus Phaenicophaeus – Stephens, 1815 – seven species
| Common name | Scientific name and subspecies | Range | IUCN status and estimated population |
|---|---|---|---|
| Chestnut-breasted malkoha | Phaenicophaeus curvirostris (Shaw, 1810) Five subspecies: P. c. singularis; P. c. curvirostris; P. c. deningeri; P. c. microrhinus; P. c. harringtoni | Southeast Asia from Myanmar through to eastern Java, the Philippines and Borneo | LC |
| Mentawai malkoha | Phaenicophaeus oeneicaudus Verreaux, J & Verreaux, É, 1855 | Mentawai Islands off the western coast of Sumatra | LC |
| Black-bellied malkoha | Phaenicophaeus diardi (Lesson, 1830) | Brunei, Indonesia, Malaysia, Myanmar, Singapore, and Thailand. | LC |
| Chestnut-bellied malkoha | Phaenicophaeus sumatranus (Raffles, 1822) | Brunei, Indonesia, Malaysia, Myanmar, Singapore, and Thailand. | LC |
| Blue-faced malkoha | Phaenicophaeus viridirostris (Jerdon, 1840) | peninsular India and Sri Lanka. | LC |
| Green-billed malkoha | Phaenicophaeus tristis (Lesson, 1830) | Indian Subcontinent and Southeast Asia | LC |
| Red-faced malkoha | Phaenicophaeus pyrrhocephalus (Pennant, 1769) | Sri Lanka | LC |
