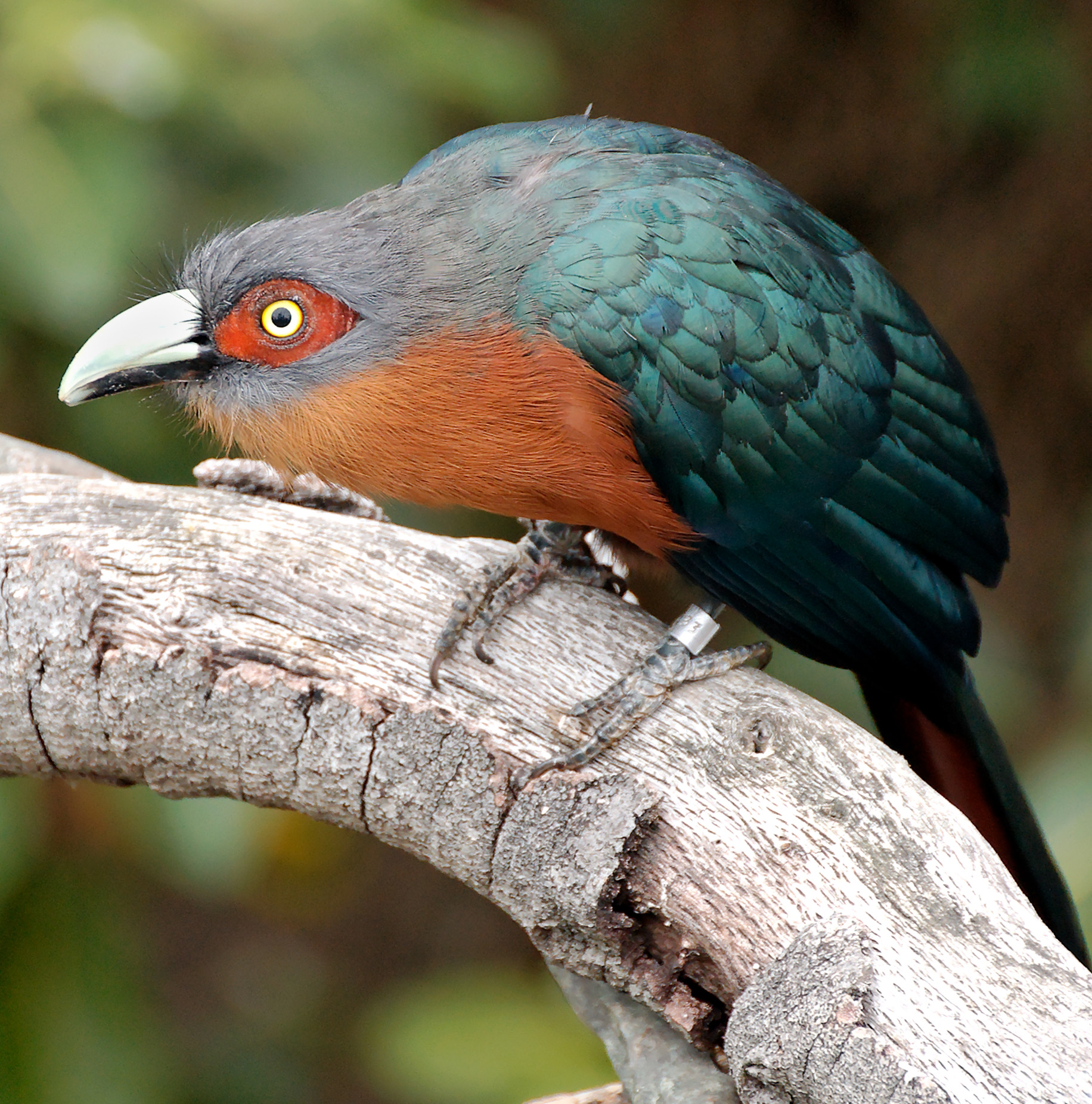
- immature

Conservation status
- Least Concern (IUCN 3.1)

Scientific classification
- Kingdom: Animalia
- Phylum: Chordata
- Class: Aves
- Order: Cuculiformes
- Family: Cuculidae
- Genus: Phaenicophaeus
- Species: P. curvirostris

Binomial name
- Phaenicophaeus curvirostris (Shaw, 1810)

= Chestnut-breasted malkoha =

Species of bird

The chestnut-breasted malkoha (Phaenicophaeus curvirostris) is a species of cuckoo in the family Cuculidae. Found in Southeast Asia from Myanmar through to eastern Java, the Philippines and Borneo, it is a large cuckoo measuring up to 49 cm (19 in) with grey and dark green upperparts and chestnut underparts, and a large curved pale upper mandible. The male and female are similar in plumage. Unlike many cuckoos, it builds its nest and raises its own young.

== Taxonomy ==
The chestnut-breasted malkoha was first described from a specimen collected in western Java by English naturalist George Shaw in 1810 as Cuculus curvirostris, before the genus Phaenicophaeus was erected by English naturalist James Francis Stephens in 1815. Its specific epithet is derived from the Latin words curvus "curved", and rostrum "beak". The genus name is derived from the ancient Greek phoiniko- "crimson", and phaes "eyes" or "face", referring to the red-faced malkoha. However, the 'œ' was transcribed incorrectly as 'æ'.

=== Subspecies ===
Five subspecies are recognised:

- P. c. singularis: from southern Myanmar and Thailand, through the Malay Peninsula and into Sumatra, as well as the Anambas archipelago.
- P. c. curvirostris: from central and western Java.
- P. c. deningeri: from eastern Java and Bali.
- P. c. microrhinus: from Bangka Island and Borneo.
- P. c. harringtoni: from Palawan, Balabac, Calamian and Dumaran islands of the Palawan province of the western Philippines.

The Mentawai malkoha (Phaenicophaeus oeneicaudus) was formerly considered as a subspecies. It was promoted to species status based on the significant morphological differences.

== Description ==
Measuring 42–49 cm (17–19 in) in length, the chestnut-breasted malkoha has a large, curved, pale yellow upper mandible and darker red or black lower mandible, and a bare red patch of rough skin around the eye. The head is grey and wings are dark green fading to blue with age. Its underparts and rump are chestnut, and feet are dark grey. Little sexual dimorphism is seen, as the male and female are similar in plumage, although the male has a pale blue iris and the female yellow.

== Distribution and habitat ==
It is found in Brunei, Indonesia, Malaysia, Myanmar, the western Philippines, and southern Thailand.

Its natural habitats are subtropical or tropical moist lowland forests and subtropical or tropical mangrove forests. It resides mainly in the middle story in dense foliage. Much of its forest habitat is being cleared.

== Feeding ==
It eats small vertebrates, such as small lizards, frogs, and baby birds, and insects, including caterpillars, grasshoppers, cicadas, stick insects, mantises, cockroaches, beetles, and bugs, as well as spiders and small crabs.

== Breeding ==
Unlike many cuckoos, the chestnut-breasted malkoha builds its nest and raises its own young. Breeding season varies by location, from August to December in Borneo, to January to September in Southeast Asia. The male and female pair up and build a nest around 35 cm (14 in) diameter of small branches and twigs, with a leaf-lined depression or cup around 11 cm (4.3 in) in diameter and 5 cm (2.0 in) deep. Two or three matte white eggs measuring 34 x 28 mm are laid. Both the female and male incubate the eggs, which usually hatch around 13 days after being laid. Young birds remain in the nest for around 11 days, during which time they are fed by both parents.
