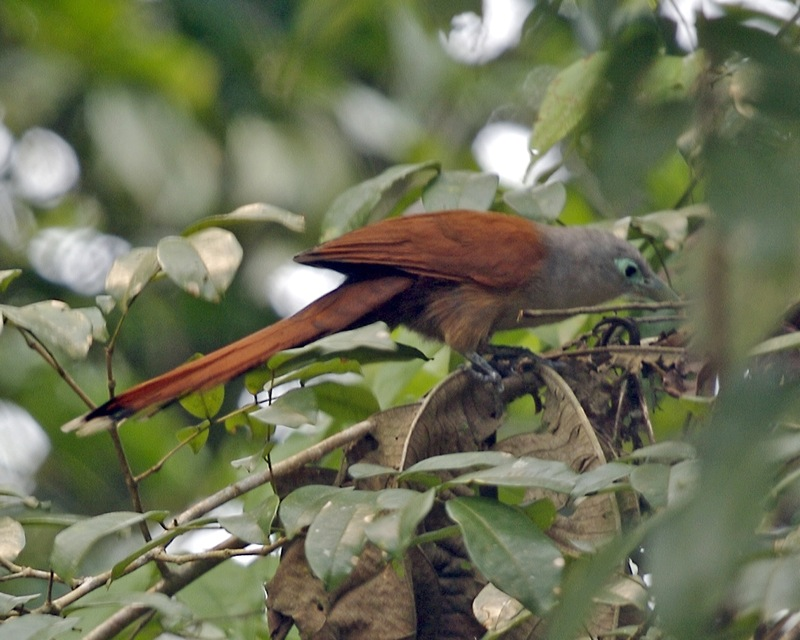

Conservation status
- Least Concern (IUCN 3.1)

Scientific classification
- Kingdom: Animalia
- Phylum: Chordata
- Class: Aves
- Order: Cuculiformes
- Family: Cuculidae
- Genus: Rhinortha; Vigors, 1830
- Species: R. chlorophaea

Binomial name
- Rhinortha chlorophaea (Raffles, 1822)

Synonyms
- Cuculus chlorophaeus Raffles, 1822; Phaenicophaeus chlorophaeus (Raffles, 1822)

= Raffles's malkoha =

Species of bird

Raffles's malkoha (Rhinortha chlorophaea) is a species of cuckoo (family Cuculidae). It was formerly often placed in Phaenicophaeus with the other malkohas, but it appears to not be very closely related to the true malkohas. It exhibits several autapomorphies and sexual dimorphism (which its presumed relatives all lack).

It is found in Brunei, Indonesia, Malaysia, Myanmar, and Thailand. It was once found in Singapore but is now considered extirpated. Its natural habitat is subtropical or tropical moist lowland forests.

Its diet consists of insects, including caterpillars, cicadas, crickets, beetles, and locusts.

During courtship, the male Raffles's malkoha has been observed to stand on the base of the female's outstretched wings and hold a frog in its bill. It is unclear whether the frog is a gift to the female or whether the male keeps it afterward.
