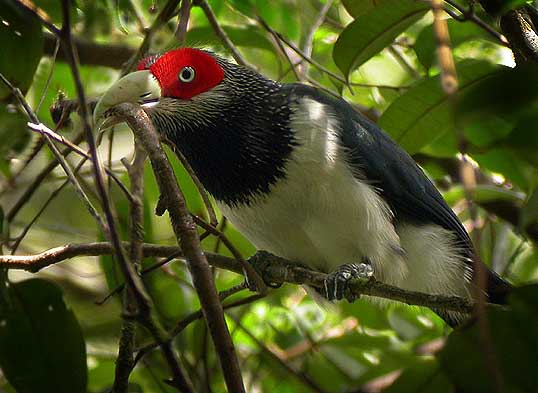

Conservation status
- Vulnerable (IUCN 3.1)

Scientific classification
- Kingdom: Animalia
- Phylum: Chordata
- Class: Aves
- Order: Cuculiformes
- Family: Cuculidae
- Genus: Phaenicophaeus
- Species: P. pyrrhocephalus

Binomial name
- Phaenicophaeus pyrrhocephalus (Pennant, 1769)
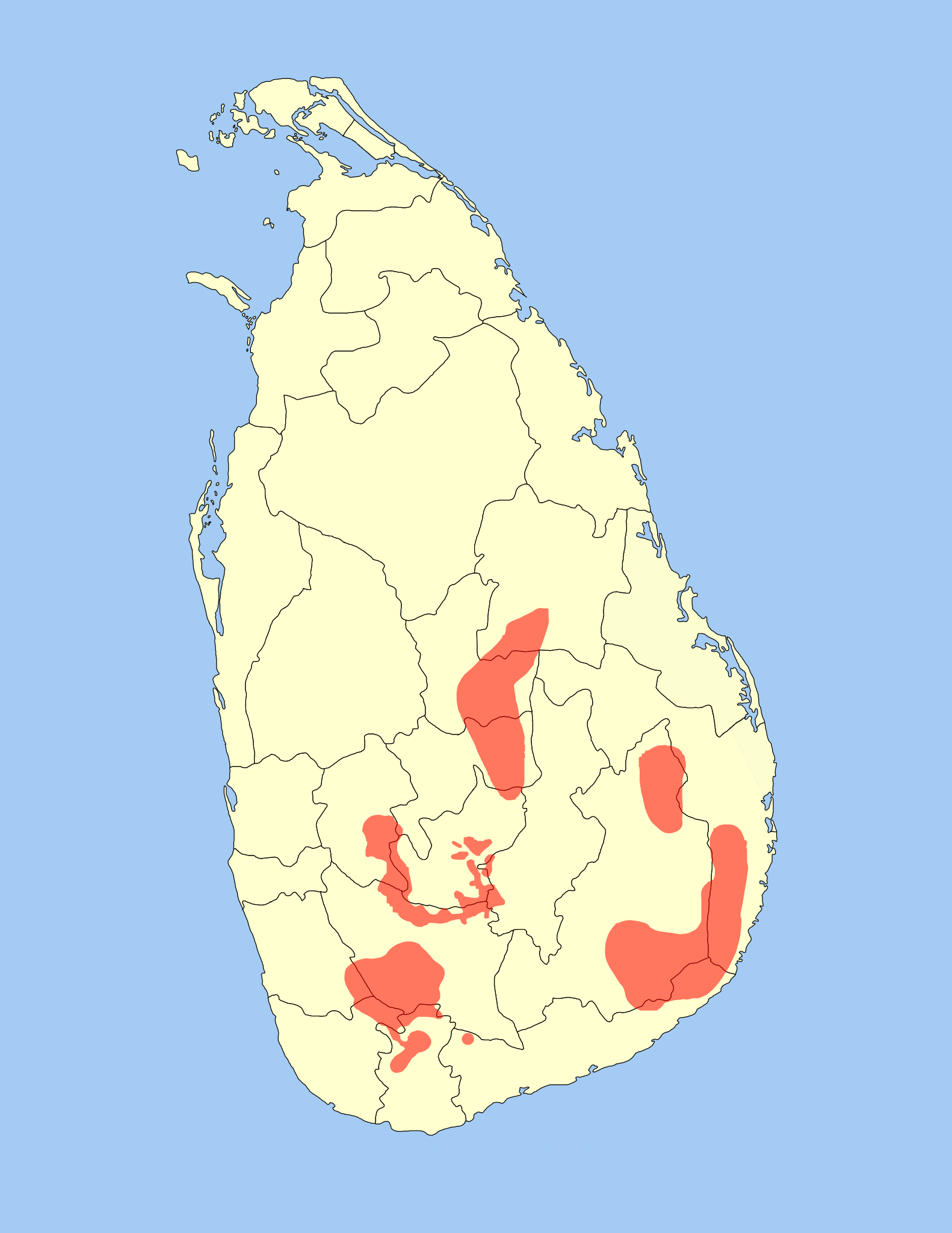

= Red-faced malkoha =

Species of bird

The red-faced malkoha (Phaenicophaeus pyrrhocephalus) is a member of the cuckoo order of birds, the Cuculiformes. This malkoha species is endemic to Sri Lanka

== Description ==
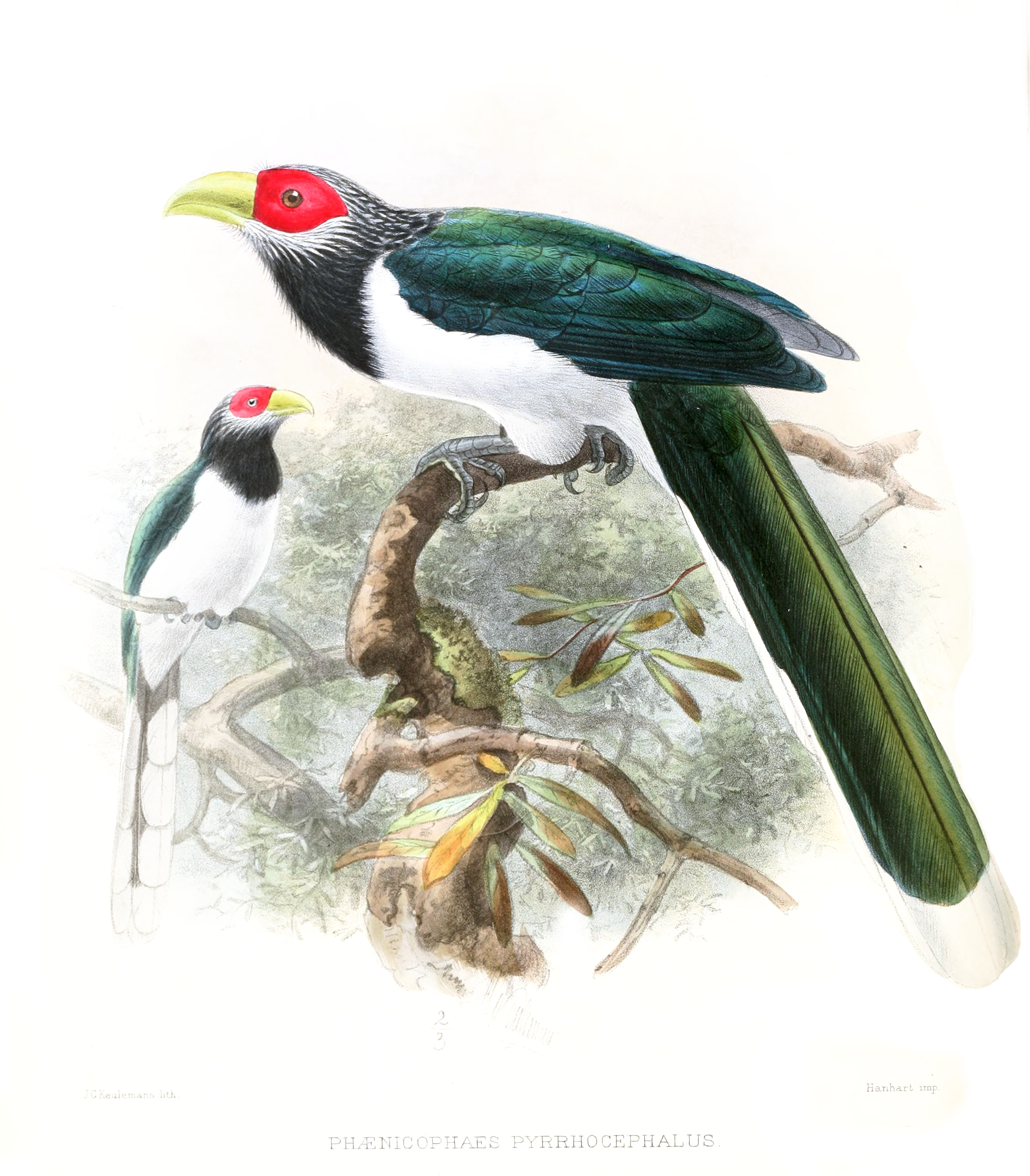
Colour plate from A History of the Birds of Ceylon, Volume 1 by John Gerrard Keulemans, 1878

This is a large species at 46 cm (18 in) with a long graduated tail. Its back is dark green, and the uppertail is green edged with white. The belly and undertail are white, the latter being barred black. The crown and throat are black, and the lower face white. There is a large red patch around the eye and the bill is green. Sexual dimorphism present where males having dark brown iris and females are creamy white. Juveniles are with much duller plumage.

The red-faced malkoha takes a variety of insects including caterpillars, giant stick insects, mantises and small vertebrates such as lizard. It occasionally may eat berries but this needs confirmation.

Unlike most cuckoos, this is a quiet species, making only the odd soft grunt.

== Distribution ==
It is endemic to Sri Lanka although some old records have apparently erroneously referred to its presence in southern India. According to Baker (1934), it is found in the 'South of Travancore, where it was obtained by Stewart together with its nests'. Later, Biddulph reported a red-faced malkoha in Madurai district, southern Tamil Nadu. Thilo Hoffmann later pointed out that this record would not stand up to a modern records committee, and it is now best disregarded.

The presence of red-faced malkoha in the island is largely confined to the Sinharaja Forest Reserve and the surrounding vegetation, which is one of the biodiversity hotspots in the world.

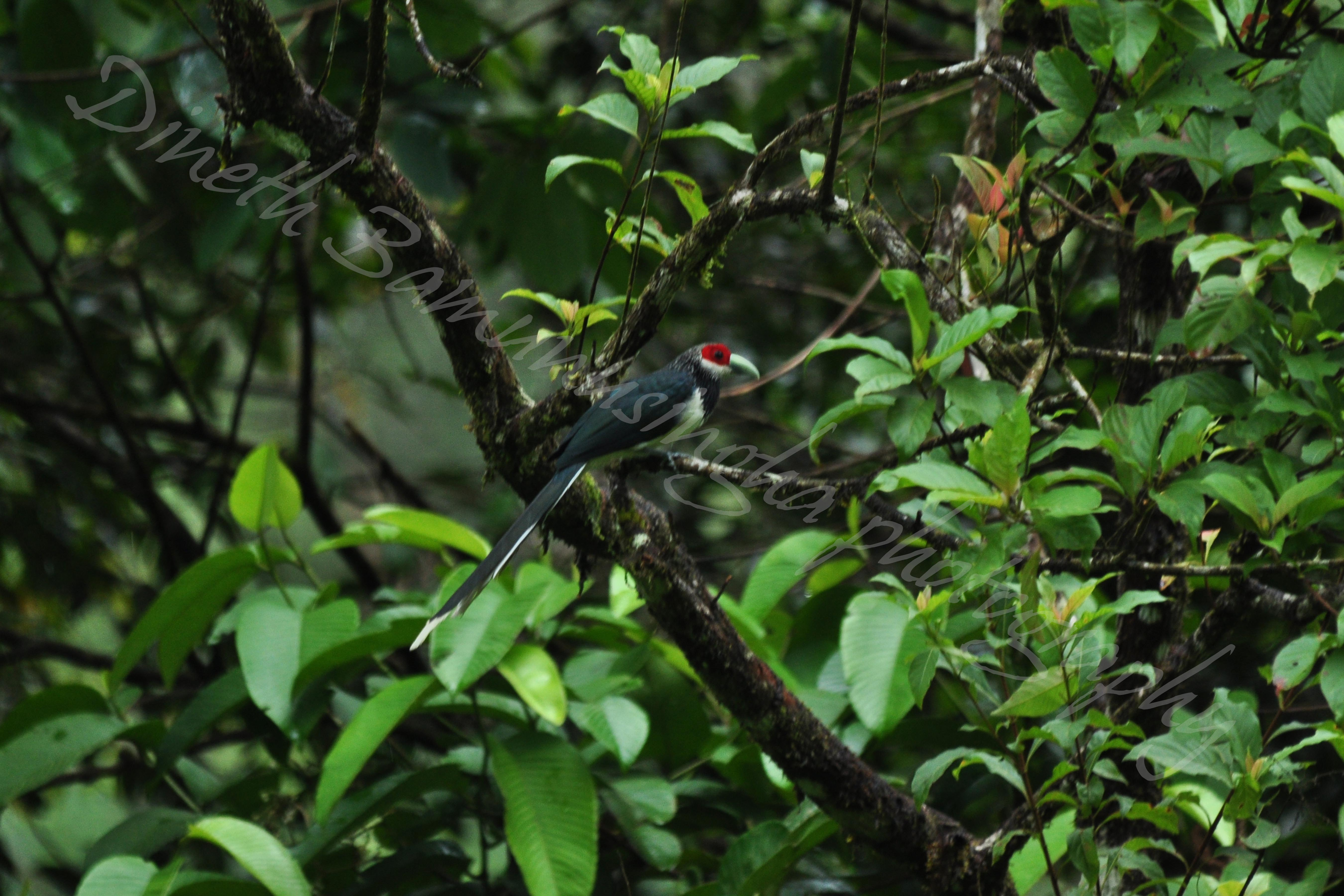
Red Faced Malkoha Location - Sinharaja Rain Forest

== Habitat ==
The red-faced malkoha is a bird of dense forests, where it can be difficult to see despite its size and colour. It prefers low country wet zone forests, sub-montane forests, montane forests and riverine forests and in a few dry-zone forests in Sri Lanka. It can be seen in most of the largest rain forest patches in the wet zone and in dry zone Yala National Park, Lahugala National Park, Wasgamuwa National Park and Udawalawe National Park.

== Breeding biology ==
It makes a deep cup nest in a well concealed foliage in sub canopy level, generally between 5–12 m (20–40 ft) in height. The typical clutch being 2-3 eggs. Both male and females engage in nest building.

== Behaviour ==
They are found in nearly half of the mixed-species foraging flocks in the Sinharaja area. Most of the individuals of Red-faced Malkohas which participate in the mixed-species bird flocks tend to prefer in the front of the flock. There is a high probability to see this cryptic bird in the flock if you observe the front half of the flock.

== In culture ==
The common name for this species malkoha is derived from the Sinhala vernacular name. 'Mal-Koha' translates to 'flower-cuckoo'. The red-faced malkoha appears on a 5 rupee Sri Lankan postal stamp.
