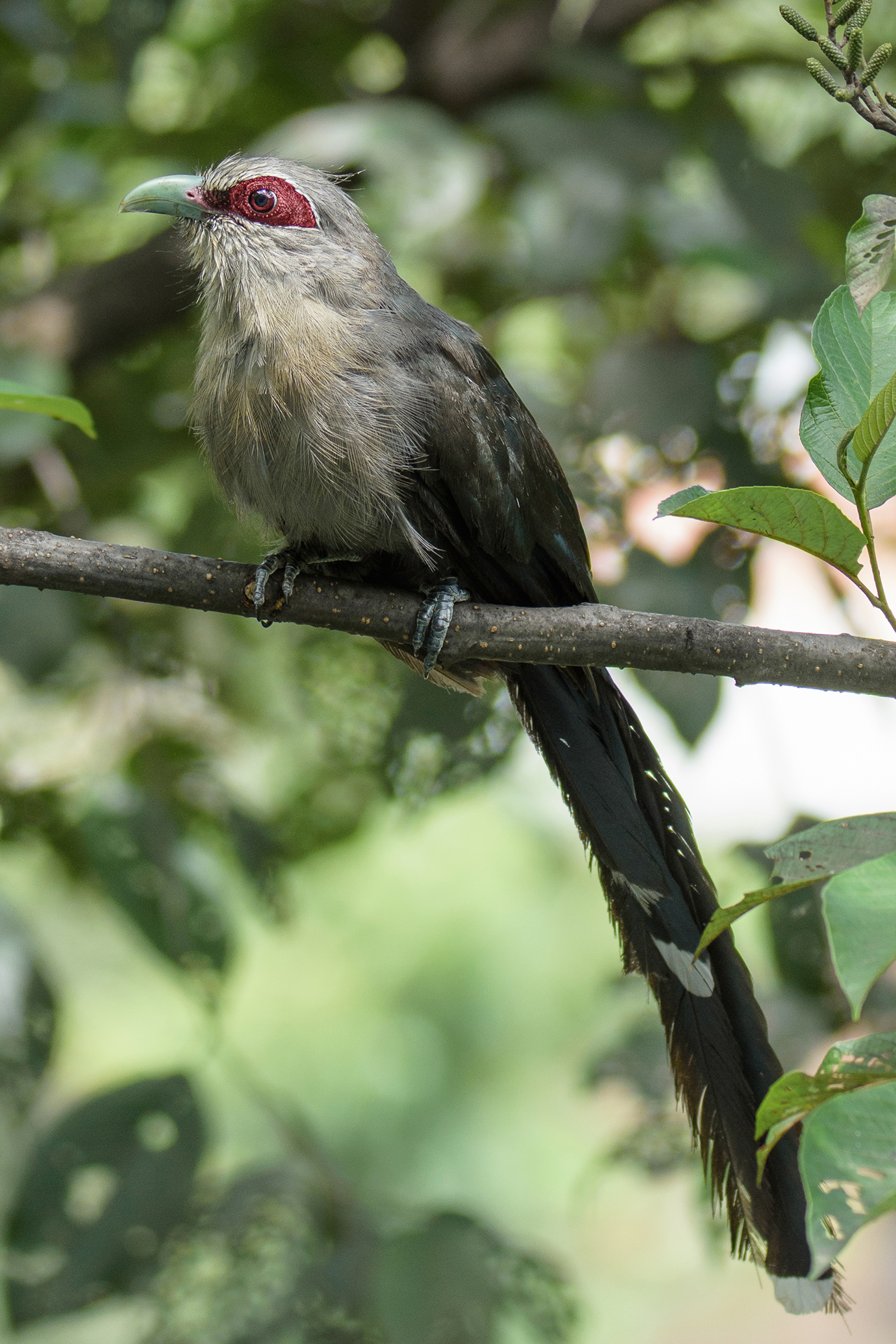
- in Nepal

Conservation status
- Least Concern (IUCN 3.1)

Scientific classification
- Kingdom: Animalia
- Phylum: Chordata
- Class: Aves
- Order: Cuculiformes
- Family: Cuculidae
- Genus: Phaenicophaeus
- Species: P. tristis

Binomial name
- Phaenicophaeus tristis (Lesson, 1830)

Synonyms
- Rhopodytes tristis

= Green-billed malkoha =

Species of bird

The green-billed malkoha (Phaenicophaeus tristis) is a species of non-parasitic cuckoo found throughout the Indian subcontinent and Southeast Asia. The birds are waxy bluish black with a long graduated tail with white tips to the tail feathers. The bill is prominent and curved. These birds are found in dry scrub and thin forests.

== Description ==
Green-billed malkoha is about 50–60 cm long and weighs 100–128 g. It often has a clear white boarder to the red face patch salty grey on the face and neck. Adult green-billed malkoha has dark grey with green gloss above, oily green wings.

== Distribution and habitat ==
Its breeding habitat is primary forest, second growth, dense thickets, scrub, cultivated areas, rubber plantations across south Asia east from Nepal, India, and Sri Lanka to the Southeast Asia.

It mainly lives on insects, but also is known to catch small lizards and small mammals, occasionally catches insects in flight.

== Gallery ==
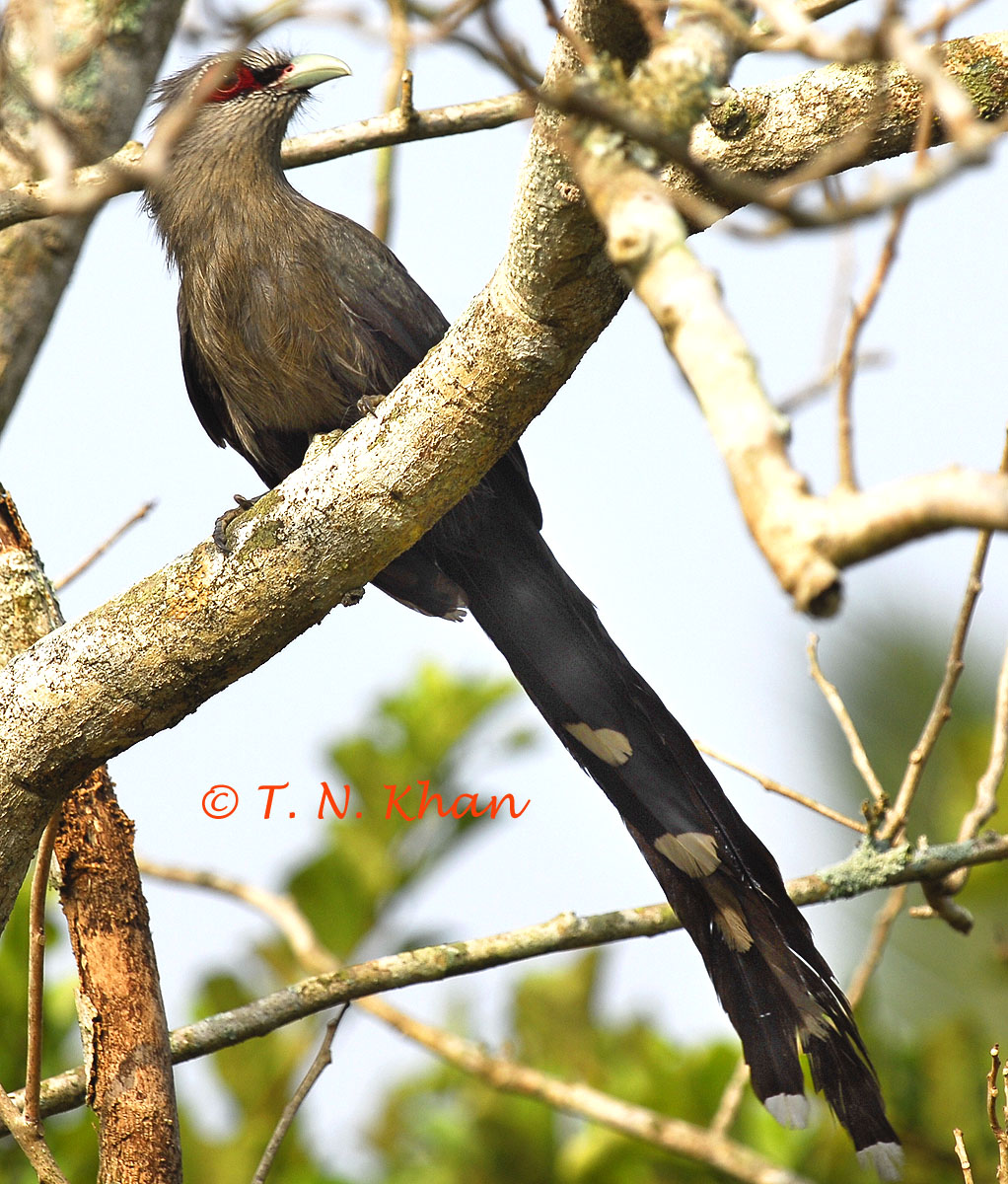

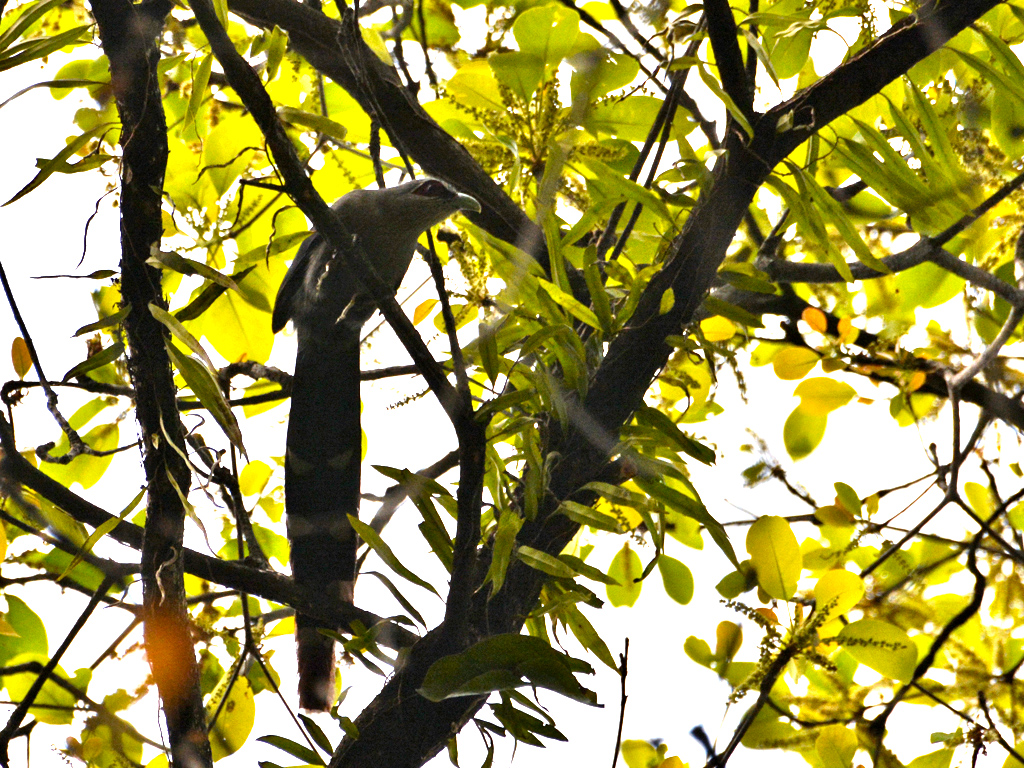
Large green-billed malkoha

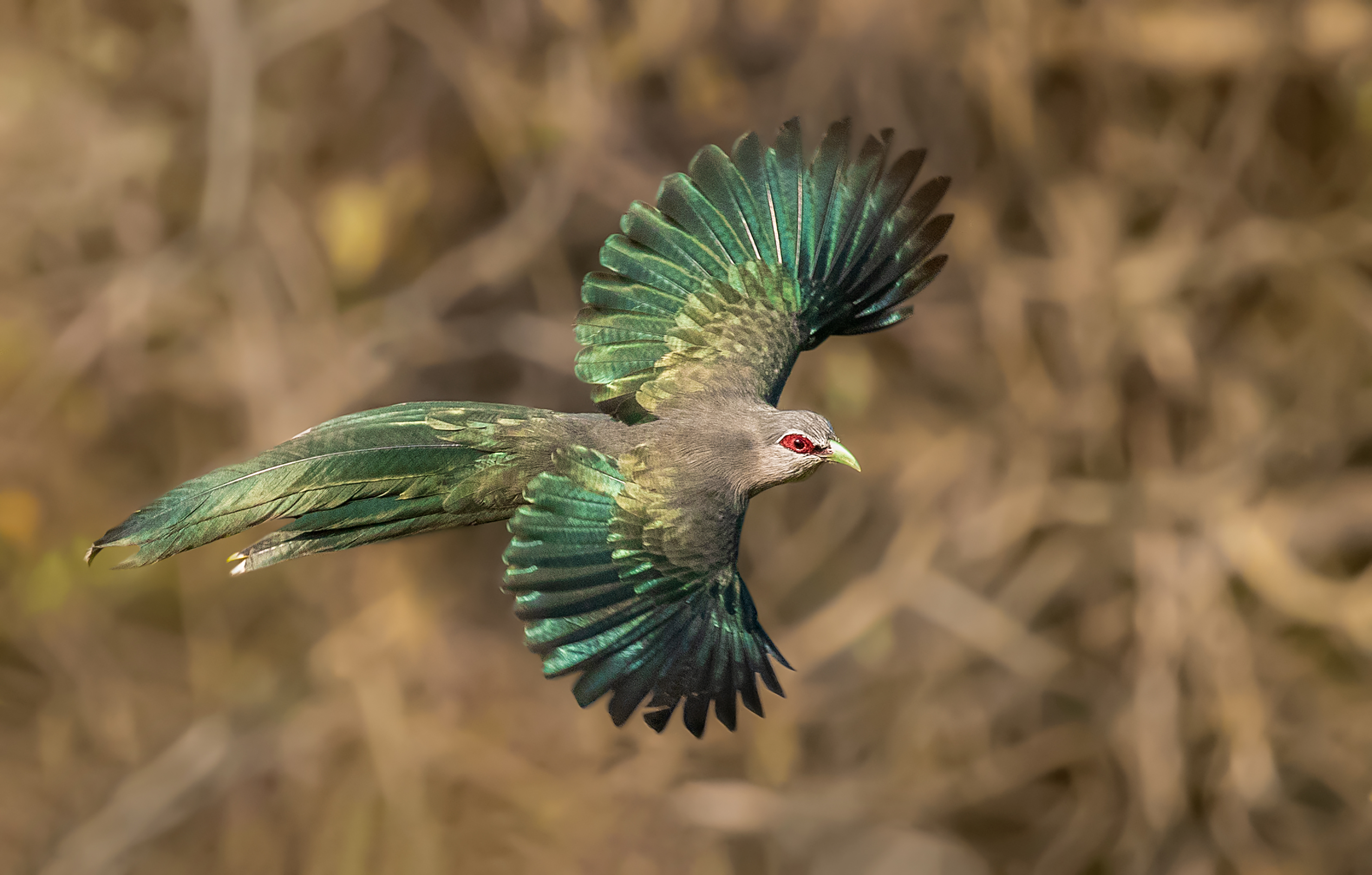
Green-billed malkoha in Bangladesh

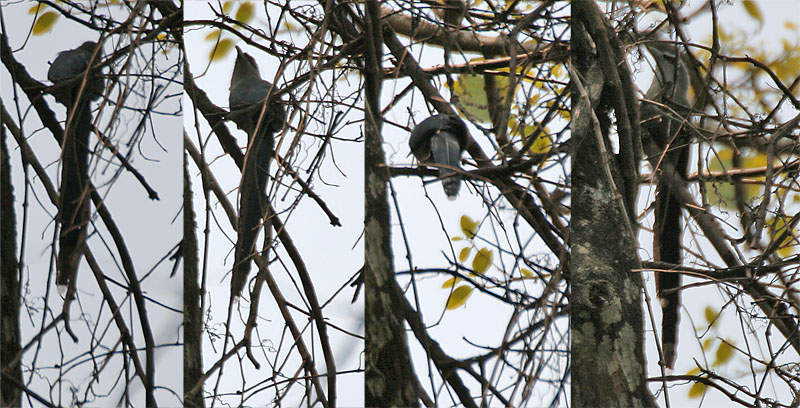
at Jayanti in Buxa Tiger Reserve in Jalpaiguri district of West Bengal, India

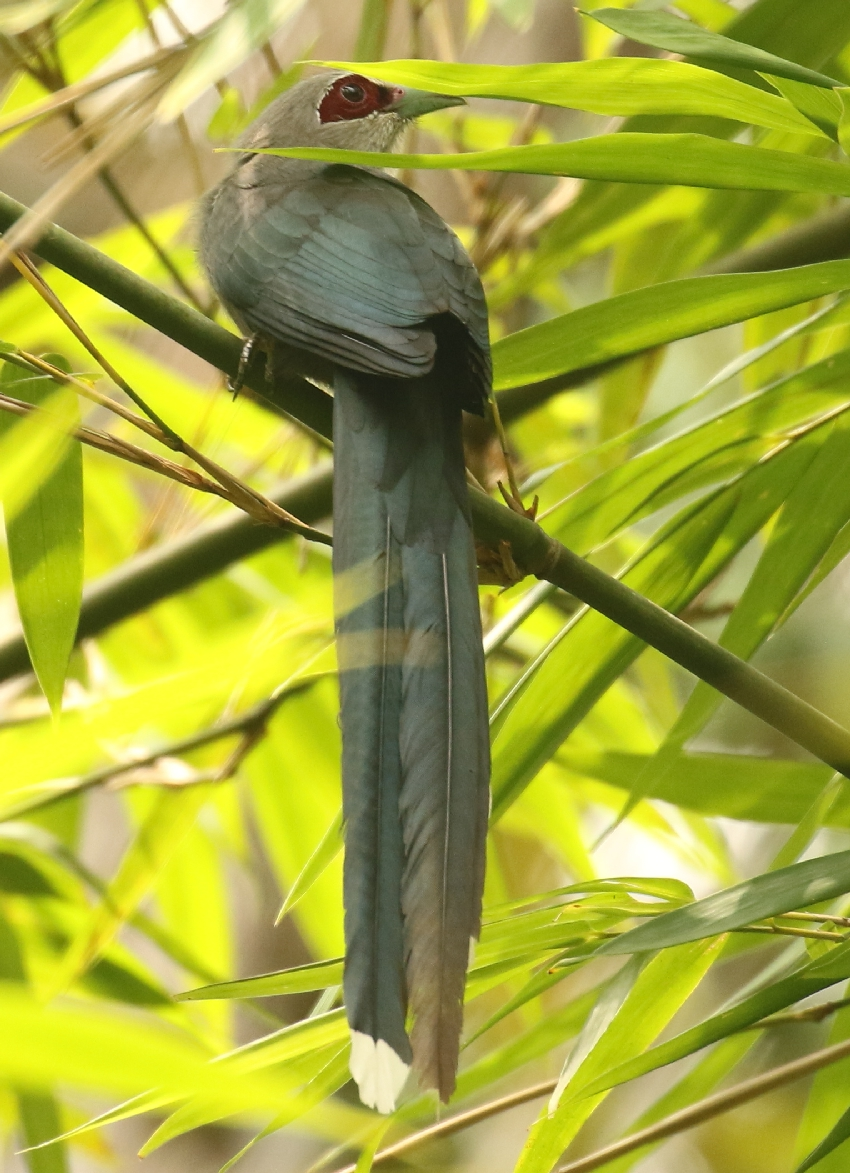
Kaeng Krachan Nat'l Park - Thailand

Fraser's Hill, Malaysia, Sept 1997

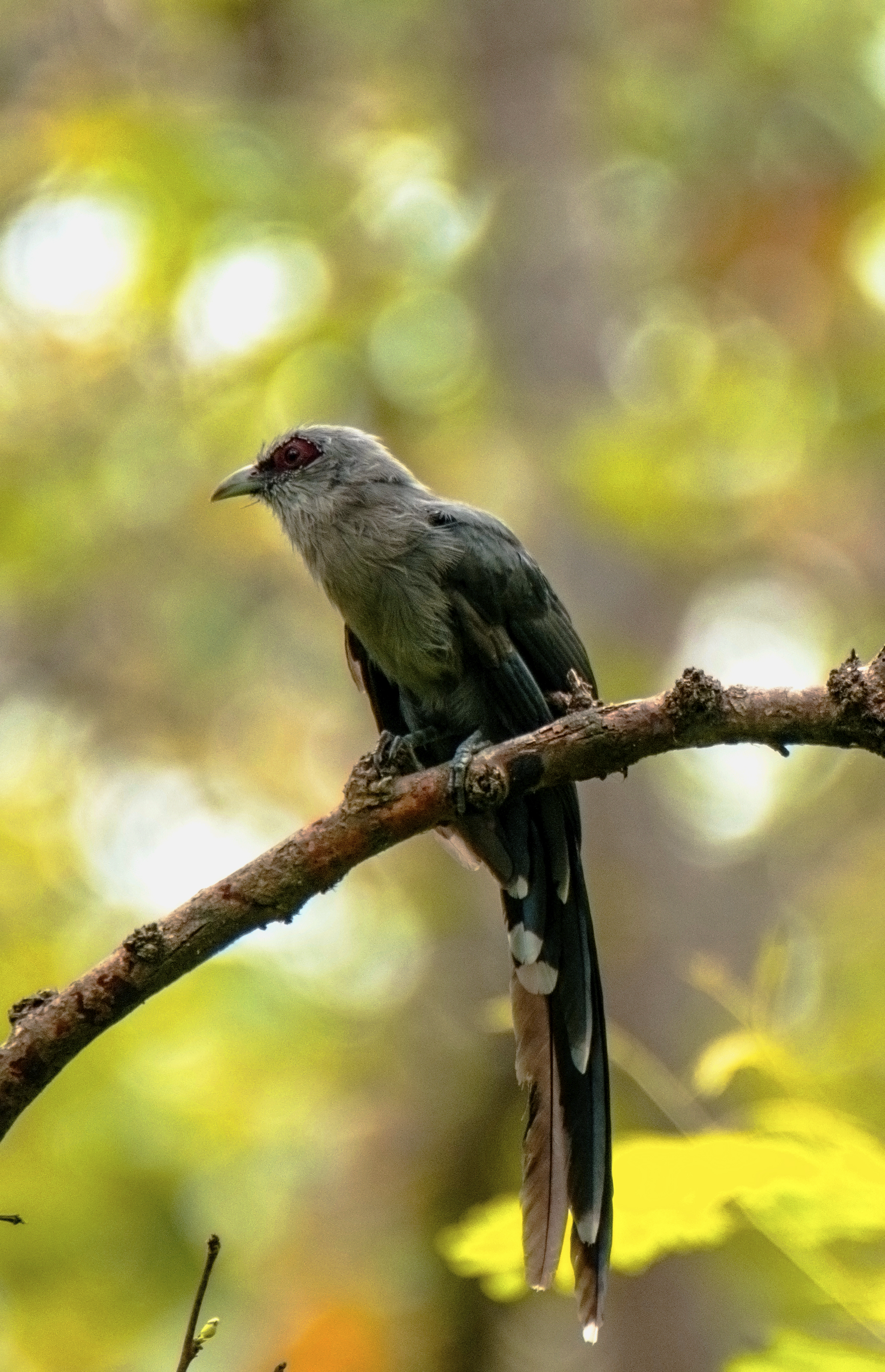

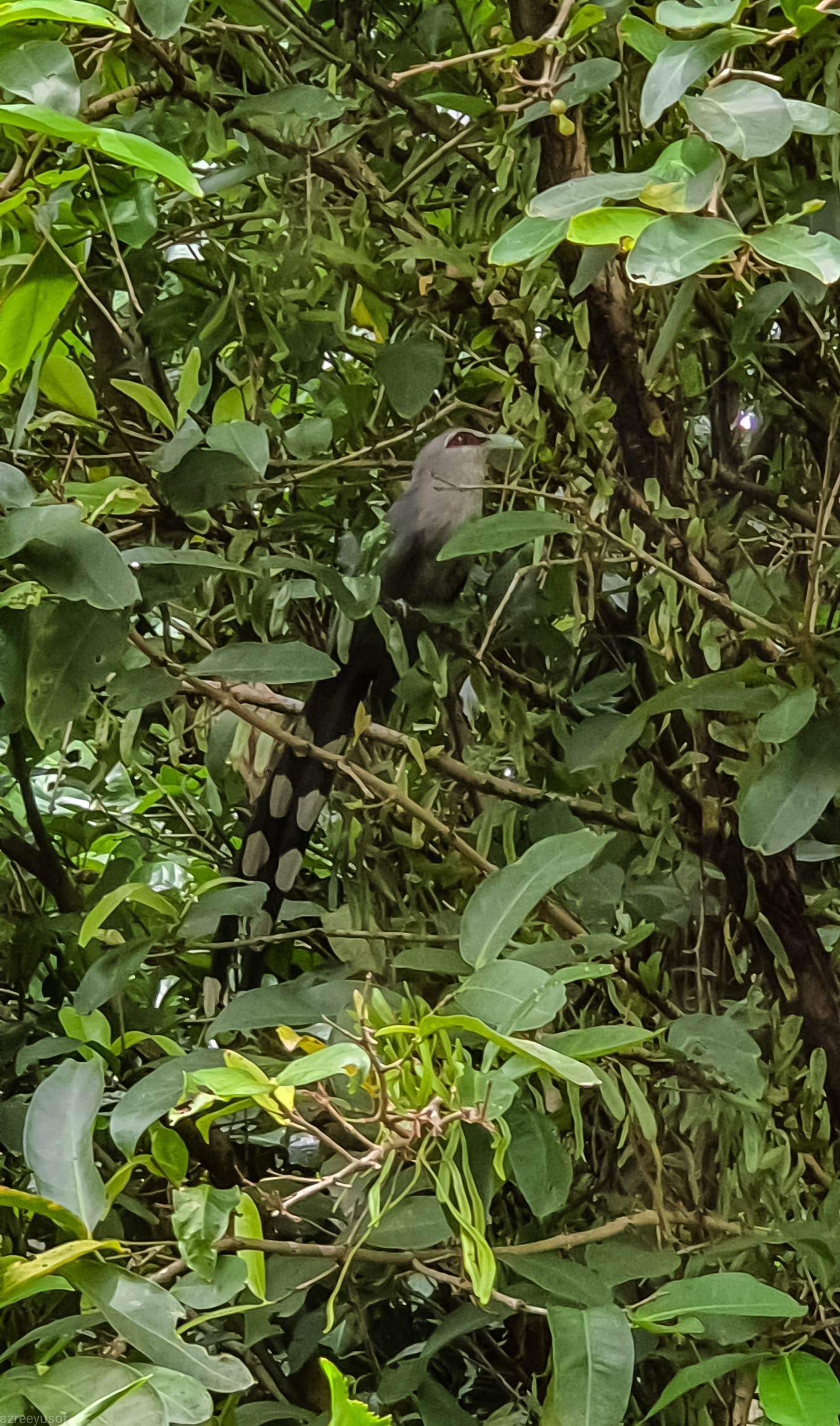
Bandar Baru Bangi, Selangor, Malaysia.
