= List of cities in the Comoros =

This is a list of the populated places in Comoros, according to the region they are located in.

== Anjouan ==
- Adda-Douéni
- Akibani
- Antsahé
- Assimpao
- Bada Kouni
- Bada la Djandza
- Bambao Mtrouni
- Bandajou
- Bandra Lamahalé
- Bandrani
- Bandrani-Mtangani
- Barakani
- Bazimini
- Bimbini
- Boungoueni
- Chandra
- Chaouéni
- Chironkamba
- Chiroroni
- Chitrouni
- Daji
- Dar-Salama
- Dindri
- Domoni
- Dziani
- Dzidri-I
- Dzindri
- Gnambo Mouro
- Gnatranga-Moiou
- Hachimpenda
- Hajoho
- Hamchako
- Harembo
- Jimilimé
- Jimlimi
- Kangani
- Koki
- Komoni
- Koni Ngani
- Koni-Djodjo
- Kowé-Cosini
- Limbi
- Lingoni
- Magnassini
- Magnassini-Nindri
- Maraharé
- Mbambao Mtsanga
- Mboigoma
- Milémbéni
- Mirongani
- Mirontsi
- Mjamaoue
- Mjimandra
- Moujimvia
- Moya
- Mramani
- Mrémani
- Mridjou
- Mromadji
- Mutsamudu (island capital)
- Ndrodoni
- Ngandzalé
- Ongodjou
- Ongoni
- Ongoujou
- Ouani
- Ouzinii
- Patsy
- Pomoni
- Pomoni-Nindri
- Saandani
- Salamani
- Sima
- Tsimbeo
- Vassi
- Vouani

== Grande Comore ==
- Bahani
- Bambadjani
- Bambani
- Bandamadji-Ladomba
- Bangoi-Hamtsaha-Madjeoué
- Bangoi-Mafousa Nkoa
- Batsa
- Boeni ya Bambao
- Boudadjou
- Bouni
- Chamlé
- Chezani
- Chindini
- Chouani
- Dembéni
- Dimadjou
- Dimadjou-Mdé
- Djomani-Mchenazi
- Djoumoichongo-Nyoumbadjou
- Domoni ya Djou
- Douniani
- Dzahadjou
- Dzahadjou Lamzandé
- Dzahani
- Dzoidjou
- Foumbouni
- Founga-Anihani
- Gnadombéni
- Hadjambou
- Hahaya-Aéroport
- Hambou
- Hantsambou
- Hantsindzi
- Héléindjé-Salimani-Zounda
- Heroumbili
- Hirohé
- Iconi
- Idjinkoundzi
- Ifoundihé Chamboini
- Itsandzéni
- Itsikoudi
- Itsinkoundi
- Ivémbéni-Bandasamoulini
- Ivoini
- Kandzilé-Mdjoihaya
- Koimbani
- Koua
- Madjéouéni
- Mandza
- Maouéni
- Maouéni-Ladjiri
- Mavingouni
- Mbachilé-Napabo
- Mbangoi-Koni-Mizidjou
- Mbéni
- Mdé-Sahani
- Mdjankagnoi
- Mdjouézi
- Mdjoyezi
- Mémboi-Djou
- Mitsamiouli
- Mitsoudjé
- Mitsoudjé-Troumbeni
- Mmnoungou
- Mohoro
- Moidja
- Moidzaza Mboini
- Moroni (national and island capital)
- Mtsamdou
- Mtsangadjou
- Mvouni
- Ndrouani
- Ndzaouzé
- Ngnoumadzaha Mvoubari
- Nioumamilima
- Nkourani
- Nouma Milima
- Noumadzaha
- Nroundé
- Ntsadjéni
- Ntsaouéni
- Ntsoralé
- Ntsoudjini
- Nyambéni
- Ouéllah-Tayfa
- Ouhozi
- Ounkazi
- Ourovéni
- Ousivo
- Ouzioini
- Panda
- Pidjani
- Salimani
- Salimani-Mdjiparé
- Samba-Kouni
- Samba-Mbondoni
- Séléa
- Seleani-Tsoralé
- Simamboini
- Simboussa
- Singani
- Tsidjé
- Tsinimoichongo
- Tsinimoipanga-Mihaboini
- Vanadjou
- Vanamboini
- Vouvouni
- Zivandani

== Mohéli ==
- Bandar Salama
- Barakani
- Djoièzi
- Fomboni (island capital)
- Hoani
- Kangani
- Mbatsé
- Miringoni
- Mtakoudja
- Ndrondroni
- Nioumachoua
- Ouallah
- Sambia
- Wanani
- Ziroudani

== See also ==
- List of cities in East Africa
