= List of populated places in the Comoros =

This is the list of populated places in the Comoros, grouped by commune, grouped by prefecture and grouped by island group.

== Anjouan ==
=== Prefecture of Mutsamudu ===
==== Commune of Mutsamudu ====
- Mutsamudu
- Pagé
- Mwamwa
- Chiconi I

==== Commune of Mirontsy ====
- Mirontsy

==== Commune of Bandrani ya Chironkamba ====
- M'jimandra
- Akibani
- Chironkamba
- Maweni
- Chiconi II
- Mpouzini
- Bandra Oupepo

==== Commune of Bandrani-Mtsangani ====
- Bandrani-Mtsangani
- Chitrouni
- Saandani
- Mjamaoué

=== Prefecture of Ouani ===
==== Commune of Ouani ====
- Ouani
- Barakani
- Gnatranga-Moiou
- Tanambao

==== Commune of Bazimini ====
- Bazimini
- Nkoki
- Patsy

==== Commune of Bambao Mtrouni ====
- Tsembéhou
- Dindri
- Chandra

=== Prefecture of Domoni ===
==== Commune of Domoni ====
- Domoni
- Limbi
- Bweladungu

==== Commune of Ngandzalé ====
- Ngandzalé
- Outsa
- Salamani
- Ouzini

==== Commune of Koni ====
- Koni-Djodjo
- Koni Ngani
- Hachimpenda
- Gégé

==== Commune of Bambao Mtsanga ====
- Bambao Mtsanga
- Mromagi
- Ongoni
- Mahalé

==== Commune of Jamilimé ====
- Harambo I
- Harambo II
- Hajoho
- Jamilimé

=== Prefecture of Mrémani ===
==== Commune of Adda ====
- Adda Daouéni
- Jandza
- Mannyassini
- Kangani

==== Commune of Mrémani ====
- Mrémani
- Bada Kouni
- M'Rijou
- Daji

==== Commune of Ongodjou ====
- Ongodjou
- Kiyo
- Komoni
- Mirondroni
- Trindrini

==== Commune of Shaweni ====
- Shaweni
- Hamchako
- Sadapoini
- Nounga
- Mnadzichumwe

==== Commune of Mramani ====
- Mramani
- Antsahé
- Nyamboimro
- Dziani

=== Prefecture of Sima ===
==== Commune of Sima ====
- Sima
- Kavani
- Bimbini
- Boungouéni
- Mirongani
- Milembéni

==== Commune of Vouani ====
- Mronhouli
- Maraharé
- Assimpao
- Shitsangasheli
- Vassi
- Iméré
- Dzindri
- Vouani
- Dar-Salama
- Bandrani ya Vouani
- Chirové
- Marontroni
- Salamani
- Imere ya Gawani

==== Commune of Moya ====
- Moya
- Kowet
- Pomoni
- Nindri
- Lingoni
- Maweni

== Grande Comore ==
=== Prefecture of Moroni-Bambao ===
==== Commune of Moroni ====
- Moroni

==== Commune of Bambao ya Djou ====
- M'kazi
- Mvouni
- Mavingouni

==== Commune of Bambao ya Hari ====
- Vouvouni
- M'Dé
- Séléa
- Nioumadzaha
- Moindzaza Djoumbé
- Mboudé Ya Djou
- Daoeni
- Dzahani
- Boueni

==== Commune of Bambao ya Mboini ====
- Iconi
- Mbachilé
- Moindzaza Mboini
- Ndrouani
- Séréhini

=== Prefecture of Hambou ===
==== Commune of Tsinimoipangua ====
- Mitsoudjé
- Troumbéni
- Chouani
- Djoumoichongo
- Banguoi
- Nkomioni
- Salimani

==== Commune of Djoumoipangua ====
- Singani
- M'djoiezi
- Hetsa
- Bambani
- Dzahadjou Hambou

=== Prefecture of Mbadjini-Ouest ===
==== Commune of Ngouéngoué ====
- Dembeni
- Mdjankagnoi
- Mboudé Ya Mboini
- Mlimani
- Panda
- Mindradou
- Mandzissani
- Tsinimoichongo
- Kandzilé
- Makorani
- Itsoundzou

==== Commune of Nioumagama ====
- Ouzioini
- Ifoundihé Chadjou
- Ifoundihé Chamboini
- Dima
- Nkourani ya Sima
- Domoni
- Dzoidjou
- Famaré

=== Prefecture of Mbadjini-Est ===
==== Commune of Itsahidi ====
- Foumbouni
- Koimbani
- Malé
- Midjendjeni
- Ourovéni
- Ndzouani
- Chindini
- Simamboini
- Dzahadjou
- Mohoro
- Nioumadzaha Mvoumbari

==== Commune of Domba ====
- Bandamadji-Ladomba
- Bandandaoueni
- Tsinimoipanga
- Oungoni
- Pidjani

==== Commune of Pimba ====
- Simboussa
- Inané
- Ngambeni
- Bandamadji Lakouboini
- Dar-Salama Mbadjini
- Mlali
- Ngnouma Milima
- Nkourani Mkanga
- Didjoni
- Kové

=== Prefecture of Oichili-Dimani ===
==== Commune of Oichili ya Djou ====
- Koimbani
- Hirohé
- Boeuni
- Dzahadjou
- Sada
- Sadani
- Chomoni
- Samba Madi
- Chamro
- Sima Oichili

==== Commune of Oichili ya Mboini ====
- Itsikoudi
- Dzahani
- Kouhani
- Mtsamdou
- Hambou
- Hasendje

==== Commune of Dimani ====
- Mtsangadjou
- Foumboudzivouni
- Mboudé
- Midjindzé
- Madjoma
- Idjoindradja
- Idjinkoundzi
- Maoueni
- Mirereni
- Ntsoralé
- Sidjou
- Rehemani

=== Prefecture of Hamahamet-Mboinkou ===
==== Commune of Nyuma Msiru ====
- Mbéni
- Séléani
- Salimani
- Sada Shihouwé
- Sada Mhuwamboi
- Bouni
- Heroumbili
- Batou
- Nkourani
- Ifoundihé
- Mnoungou

==== Commune of Nyuma Mro ====
- Dimadjou
- Gnadomboéni
- Mdjihari
- Moidja
- Bambadjani
- Ngolé
- Itsandzéni
- Ouellah Hamahamet
- Hadjambou
- Mbatsé

==== Commune of Mboinkou ====
- Madjeouéni
- Sadani
- Trélézini
- Chezani
- Ndroudé
- Nyumamilima
- Hantsindzi
- Bandamadji

=== Prefecture of Mitsamiouli-Mboudé ===
==== Commune of Cembenoi Lac-Salé ====
- Bangoi-Kouni
- Batsa Itsandra
- Ouzio
- Ivoini

==== Commune of Cembenoi Sada-Djoulamlima ====
- Ouemani
- Koua
- Ouellah

==== Commune of Mitsamiouli ====
- Mémboimboini
- Hadawa
- Fassi
- Mitsamiouli
- Nkourani
- Ndzaouzé

==== Commune of Nyuma Komo ====
- Bangoi Mafsankoa
- M'boudadjou
- Pidjani
- Songomani
- Toyifa
- Ntsadjéni
- Founga-Anihani
- Ouhozi

==== Commune of Nyumamro Kiblani ====
- Djomani-Mchenazi
- Chamlé
- Vouvouni
- Mandza
- Mjoiézi
- Héléindjé-Salimani-Zounda
- Douniani
- Koua

==== Commune of Nyumamro Souheili ====
- Ntsaoueni
- Ivémbéni-Bandasamoulini
- Djongoé
- Maoueni
- Simboussa
- Ntsoralé
- Domoidjou
- Domoimboini
- Moidja

=== Prefecture of Itsandra-Hamanvou ===
==== Commune of Hamanvou ====
- Hahaya
- Bouenindi Hamanvou
- Mbambani
- Mbaleni
- Oussivo
- Mbangani
- Diboini
- Bibavou
- Milevani

==== Commune of Mbadani ====
- Batsa Itsandra
- Vanamboini
- Vanadjou
- Mhandani
- Dzahadjou
- Vounambadani

==== Commune of Bangaani ====
- Itsandra Mdjini
- Salimani
- Samba Mbodoni
- Dzahani la Tsidjé
- Maoueni
- Mirontsy
- Bandamadji
- Dimadjou

==== Commune of Djoumoichongo ====
- Dzahani II
- Bahani
- Sima
- Ouellah
- Samba Nkouni

==== Commune of Isahari ====
- Ntsoudjini
- Hantsambou
- Milembeni
- Zivandani

== Mohéli ==
=== Prefecture of Fomboni ===
==== Commune of Fomboni ====
- Fomboni

==== Commune of Moinbassa ====
- M'Batsé
- Hoani
- Domoni

==== Commune of Moili Mdjini ====
- Boingoma
- Bandar Salama
- Djoiezi

=== Prefecture of Nioumachioi ===
==== Commune of Moimbao ====
- Hamba
- Barakani
- Miringoni
- Ouallah I
- Ouallah II

==== Commune of M'Lédjélé ====
- Mirémani
- N'Drondroni
- Nioumachoua
- N'Dréméyani

=== Prefecture of Djando ===
==== Commune of Djando ====
- Siri Ziroudani
- Wanani
- M'Labanda
- N'Kangani
- Hagnamoida
- Itsamia
- Hamavouna

== See also ==
- List of cities in the Comoros
