= Barakani =

Barakani may refer to:

- Barakani, Anjouan: a small town on the island of Anjouan in the Comoros
- Barakani, Mwali, Comoros
- Barakani, Mayotte
