= Mémboi-Djou =

- Village
- Country: Comoros
- Island: Grande Comore

Population (1991)
  - Total: 1,113
- Time zone: UTC+3 (EAT)

Mémboi-Djou is a village on the island of Grande Comore (Ngazidja) in the Comoros. According to the 1991 census, the village had a population of 1,113.
