= Nouma Milima =

- Village
- Country: Comoros
- Island: Grande Comore

Population (1991)
  - Total: 2,177
- Time zone: UTC+3 (EAT)

Grande Comore in Comoros

Nouma Milima is a village on the island of Grande Comore (Ngazidja) in the Comoros. According to the 1991 census, the village had a population of 2177.
