= Tsinimoipanga-Mihaboini =

Village on Grande Comore Island, Comoros

- Village
- Interactive map of Tsinimoipanga-Mihaboini
- Country: Comoros
- Island: Grande Comore

Population (1991)
  - Total: 2,109
- Time zone: UTC+3 (EAT)

Tsinimoipanga-Mihaboini is a village on the island of Grande Comore in the Comoros. According to the 1991 census the village had a population of 2109.
