= Madjéouéni =

Coordinates: 11°49′S 43°17′E

- Village
- Interactive map of Madjéouéni
- Country: Comoros
- Island: Grande Comore

Population (1991)
  - Total: 993
- Time zone: UTC+3 (EAT)

Madjéouéni is a village on the island of Grande Comore (Ngazidja) in the Comoros. According to the 1991 census, the village had a population of 993.
