= Dzahadjou =

Coordinates: 11°50′54″S 43°20′25″E

- Village
- Interactive map of Dzahadjou
- Country: Comoros
- Island: Grande Comore

Population (1991)
  - Total: 1,319
- Time zone: UTC+3 (EAT)

Dzahadjou is a village on the island of Grande Comore (Ngazidja) in the Comoros. According to the 1991 census, the village had a population of 1319. The terrain around Dzahadjou is hilly to the west, but to the northeast it is mountainous.
