= Boeni ya Bambao =

- Village
- Location in Comoros
- Coordinates: 11°37′52″S 043°21′07″E
- Country: Comoros
- Island: Grande Comore

Population (1991)
  - Total: 1,368
- Time zone: UTC+3 (EAT)

Boeni ya Bambao is a village on the island of Grande Comore (Ngazidja) in the Comoros. According to the 1991 census, the village had a population of 1368.
