= Seleani-Tsoralé =

- Village
- Country: Comoros
- Island: Grande Comore

Population (1991)
  - Total: 939
- Time zone: UTC+3 (EAT)

Seleani-Tsoralé is a village on the island of Grande Comore in the Comoros. According to the 1991 census the village had a population of 939.
