= Ngnoumadzaha Mvoubari =

Coordinates: 11.84633°S 43.470755°E

- Village
- Interactive map of Ngnoumadzaha Mvoubari
- Country: Comoros
- Island: Grande Comore

Population (1991)
  - Total: 1,637
- Time zone: UTC+3 (EAT)

Ngnoumadzaha Mvoubari is a village on the island of Grande Comore (Ngazidja) in the Comoros. According to the 1991 census, the village had a population of 1637.
