= Ouéllah-Tayfa =

Village on Grande Comore Island, Comoros

Coordinates: 11°39′01″S 43°17′04″E

- Village
- Interactive map of Ouéllah-Tayfa
- Country: Comoros
- Island: Grande Comore

Population (1991)
  - Total: 844
- Time zone: UTC+3 (EAT)

Ouéllah-Tayfa is a village on the island of Grande Comore in the Comoros. Its located in fr:Djoumoichongo (Itsandra-Hamanvou). According to the 1991 census the village had a population of 844.
