= Bangoi-Hamtsaha-Madjeoué =

- Village
- Interactive map of Bangoi-Hamtsaha-Madjeoué
- Coordinates: 11.7174°S 43.3679°E
- Country: Comoros
- Island: Grande Comore

Population (1991)
  - Total: 1,656
- Time zone: UTC+3 (EAT)

Bangoi-Hamtsaha-Madjeoué is a village on the island of Grande Comore (Ngazidja) in the Comoros. According to the 1991 census, the village had a population of 1656.
