= Battle of Comoros =

Date	16–18 August 1616
Location	Off the Comoro Islands, Indian Ocean
Result	Inconclusive

Belligerents
Portugal	EIC

Commanders and leaders
D. Manuel de Meneses	Benjamin Joseph †; Henry Pepwell (WIA)

Strength
600 men 1 carrack	4 ships

Casualties and losses
1 carrack scuttled	2 ships damaged

The Battle of Comoros was a naval battle fought from 16 to 18 August 1616 between a single Portuguese carrack, the São Julião, commanded by D. Manuel de Meneses, and an East India Company fleet of four ships commanded by Benjamin Joseph off the Comoro Islands.

After resisting for three days, the heavily damaged São Julião ran aground on Grande Comore and was scuttled by its crew. English captain Benjamin Joseph was killed during the battle, and his successor, Henry Pepwell, was heavily wounded.

== Background ==
The Portuguese India Armada that departed the Tagus on 5 April 1616 was commanded by D. Manuel de Meneses. It comprised two newly built carracks, the flagship São Julião (1,500 t) and Nossa Senhora do Carmo, as well as the older Nossa Senhora do Cabo. The latter returned a few days after departure after taking on too much of water.

The two remaining ships continued the voyage as far as Sierra Leone, where heavy rain and thunders separated them. The Nossa Senhora do Carmo arrived in Goa on 24 October 1616 without major incidents. The São Julião did not.

After leaving the Mozambique Channel, D. Manuel de Meneses was unable to find favorable winds that would allow him to call at Mozambique Island, as was customary. Therefore, he was forced to continue directly towards India.

== Battle ==
At dawn on 16 August, while the São Julião was at around 13° 20'S latitude, four ships were sighted sailing on a similar route. They were the English vessels Charles (900 t), Unicorn (700 t), James (600 t), and Globe (500 t), which were on their way to Surat under the command of Benjamin Joseph. The English flagship was described as long and "very high at the stern, with bold paintings and gilded relief. It carried 32 pieces of artillery run out, not counting six others on another lower tier and other swivel guns."

Around noon, the Globe, the smallest English ship, positioned itself to windward near São Julião's stern and sent a boat to demand its identity and destination. Upon learning the it was the flagship of the India route, the English ordered it to strike its sails and proceed to their main flagship. D. Manuel refused, stating "the ships of Spain do not strike their sails" and his crew reportedly insulted the boat's crew.

The Globe then moved ahead, placing itself across the ship's bow until their yards and rigging tangled. The Portuguese allegedly fired musket shots at the English boat and launched a 7-pound saker cannon from their bow. The Globe immediately retaliated with a broadside from its own artillery.

During a short combat, the Globe allegedly fired eighteen shots, while the São Julião fired five. The Portuguese artillery struck the English ship once of twice and caused some wounded and dead, after which the Globe withdrew to await the arrival of the remaining fleet.

Around 4:00 PM, after the English ships had assembled near the Portuguese vessel, Benjamin Joseph sent a boat demanding that the Portuguese captain come aboard his ship to explain what happened. D. Manuel de Meneses initially rejected the demand, but, at Joseph's insistence, ended up sending the boatswain, accompanied by two soldiers, aboard the Charles.

They later returned with a letter in which the English commander demanded a formal apology for the damage and casualties inflicted on the Globe, warning that refusal would have consequences. Before responding, D. Manuel de Meneses sent a trusted man to assess the strength of the English vessels, who reported that the admiral's ship alone appeared to be more than a match for the São Julião. D. Manuel replied that the Portuguese and English kings were at peace and that there was no reason for their ships to fight. He proposed that each side continue its voyage but warned the English not to cross the Portuguese ship's bow, stating that he would use artillery to prevent this.

Benjamin Joseph ordered the Globe to cross São Julião's bow to provoke the casus belli he was looking for. The Portuguese vessel opened fire, and a second combat ensued.

Likewise, this combat was also brief, as the sun began to set and each vessel had time to fire only a single broadside. The Portuguese nevertheless struck the Charles, and one shot killed Benjamin Joseph. The São Julião disappeared into darkness while the English captains held a council to determine the admiral's successor and whether to pursue the Portuguese vessel.

D. Manuel de Meneses resumed his course and ordered a large light to be displayed at the stern of the ship to make them aware that he was willing to fight them again the next day.

At dawn on 17 August, the São Julião was close to the island of Mohéli, Comoros. After finding suitable depths near the coast, the ship anchored parallel to the shore with two anchors and moved the artillery to the seaward side in preparation for an English attack. As for the English fleet, now under the command of Henry Pepwell, it remained farther offshore and did not immediately attack, possibly to avoid running aground.

At 3:00PM, with a stronger wind, D. Manuel ordered the São Julião to weigh anchor and resume its voyage to India. Despite objections from the passengers, D. Manuel ordered the master to carry out his instructions. The ship put to sea and gained a considerable lead while sailing along the southern coast of Mohéli, intending to round the island's western point. Pepwell then ordered the English squadron to resume the pursuit, but because the Portuguese were already far ahead, the English did not catch up with it until the following morning. During the night, D. Manuel de Meneses again displayed the large stern light.

At dawn on 18 August, the English ships closed in with the São Julião, and the fighting recommenced. The Charles positioned itself at one of the quarters of the Portuguese ship, and the James at the other. Both attempted to remain outside the firing arcs of the ship's port and starboard batteries.

After firing for some time, the two ships withdrew, as their cannons had overheated, and were replaced by the Unicorn and the Globe. By rotating their ships in this manner, the four English ships were able to maintain a prolonged bombardment of the São Julião for nearly nine hours.

By about 3:00 PM, the sterncastle was largely destroyed, its masts were broken, and its hull was pierced by enemy fire. However, the crew fought to D. Manuel's satisfaction, and the English did not attempt to board, although they made several tries. The damaged ship was carried by wind and currents towards the rocky coast of Grande Comore.

Seeing the condition of the Portuguese ship, the English ceased firing and sent a boat offering terms of surrender. The English envoy, speaking in Italian, offered "life to all, supplies, bread, wine, and everything else," as well as to carry the crew to Surat and releasing them there, along with particular courtesy and a gift to D. Manuel. However, D. Manuel de Meneses refused, stating that a ship belonging to the Portuguese Crown would not surrender.

What the captain and crew of the São Julião feared did not happen. The English fleet ceased combat and continued on its way, either to avoid running out of ammunition or out of pity for the state in which they had left the Portuguese ship.

== Aftermath ==
The São Julião continued sailing in very precarious conditions, with an agitated crew eager to reach land, until, at sunset, it ran aground on the coast, resting between two rocks without capsizing, allowing the passengers and crew to reach land, after which the Portuguese set fire to the ship. The English fleet, which had remained at a distance, then continued its voyage towards Surat.

The survivors experienced great difficulty on Grande Comore before being taken aboard two pangaios belonging to a Muslim merchant, who took them to Mombasa. There, the survivors of the São Julião were transferred to two other pangaios provided by the Portuguese captain of the fortress, and resumed their journey towards Goa.

English historian William Laird Clowes later described the battle as "...an action hyghly creditable to the vanquished"; "...her crew, after a most stubborn defense, ran her ashore and set fire to her."

Saturnino Monteiro notes that the decisions made by the Portuguese during the battle show that "...the truth is that for them the supreme purpose of the war was not to achieve victory but to gain honor!"

== Bibliography ==
- Saturnino Monteiro, Armando da Silva (1994). Batalhas e Combates da Marinha Portuguesa – V (1604-1625) (in Portuguese). Lisbon: Livraria Sá da Costa.
- Gil Fernández, Luis (2020). "La 'Carreira da Índia' según Joane Mendes de Vasconcelos". Cuadernos de Historia Moderna (in Spanish). 45 (1). Universidad Complutense de Madrid: 133–144. doi:10.5209/chmo.70020.
- Danvers, Frederick (1894). The Portuguese In India. Vol. 2.
