= Salimani-Mdjiparé =

- Village
- Country: Comoros
- Island: Grande Comore

Population (1991)
  - Total: 1,957
- Time zone: UTC+3 (EAT)

Salimani-Mdjiparé is a village on the island of Grande Comore in the Comoros. According to the 1991 census the village had a population of 1957.
