= Samba-Kouni =

Village on Grande Comore Island, Comoros

Coordinates: 11°38′50″S 43°17′01″E

- Village
- Interactive map of Samba-Kouni
- Country: Comoros
- Island: Grande Comore

Population (1991)
  - Total: 1,200
- Time zone: UTC+3 (EAT)

Samba-Kouni is a village on the island of Grande Comore in the Comoros. According to the 1991 census the village had a population of 1200.
