= Bouni =

Bouni may refer to:

- Bouni language, a language of Tanzania
- Bouni, Comoros, a village in the Comoros
- Bouni, Bourasso, a village in Bourasso Department, Burkina Faso
- Bouni, Guéguéré, a village in Guéguéré Department, Burkina Faso

== See also ==
- Boune, Niger
