= Batsa =

- Village
- Location in Comoros
- Coordinates: 11°38′S 043°16′E
- Country: Comoros
- Island: Grande Comore

Population (1991)
  - Total: 1,366
- Time zone: UTC+3 (EAT)

Batsa is a village on the island of Grande Comore (Ngazidja) in the Comoros. According to the 1991 census, the village had a population of 1366.
