= Mdjoyezi =

Coordinates: 11°50′S 43°18′E

Mdjoiezi-Hambou
- Village
- Interactive map of Mdjoiezi-Hambou
- Country: Comoros
- Island: Grande Comore

Population (1991)
  - Total: 720
- Time zone: UTC+3 (EAT)

Mdjoyezi is a village on the island of Grande Comore (Ngazidja) in the Comoros. According to the 1991 census, the village had a population of 720.
