= Ounkazi =

Coordinates: 11°43′56.3″S 43°16′01.7″E

Mkazi
- Town
- Interactive map of Mkazi
- Country: Comoros
- Island: Grande Comore

Population (1991)
  - Total: 5,558
- Time zone: UTC+3 (EAT)

Mkazi is a town on the island of Grande Comore in the Comoros. According to the 1991 census the village had a population of 5558.
