= Djoueria Abdallah =

Comorian politician

Djoueria Abdallah is a Comorian politician. A midwife from Mitsamiouli village. she also served as a member of the Assembly of the Union. She represented the first constituency of Ngazidja. As of 2007, she was still the only female member of the Assembly.
