= Gnadombéni =

- Village
- Interactive map of Gnadombéni
- Coordinates: 11.471°S 43.387°E
- Country: Comoros
- Island: Grande Comore

Population (1991)
  - Total: 829
- Time zone: UTC+3 (EAT)

Gnadombéni is a village on the island of Grande Comore (Ngazidja) in the Comoros. According to the 1991 census, the village had a population of 829.
