= Mdé-Sahani =

Coordinates: 11.8700°S 43.4000°E

- Town
- Interactive map of Mdé-Sahani
- Country: Comoros
- Island: Grande Comore

Population (1991)
  - Total: 2,903
- Time zone: UTC+3 (EAT)

Mdé-Sahani is a town on the island of Grande Comore (Ngazidja) in the Comoros. According to the 1991 census, the town had a population of 2903.
