= Mbachilé-Napabo =

- Village
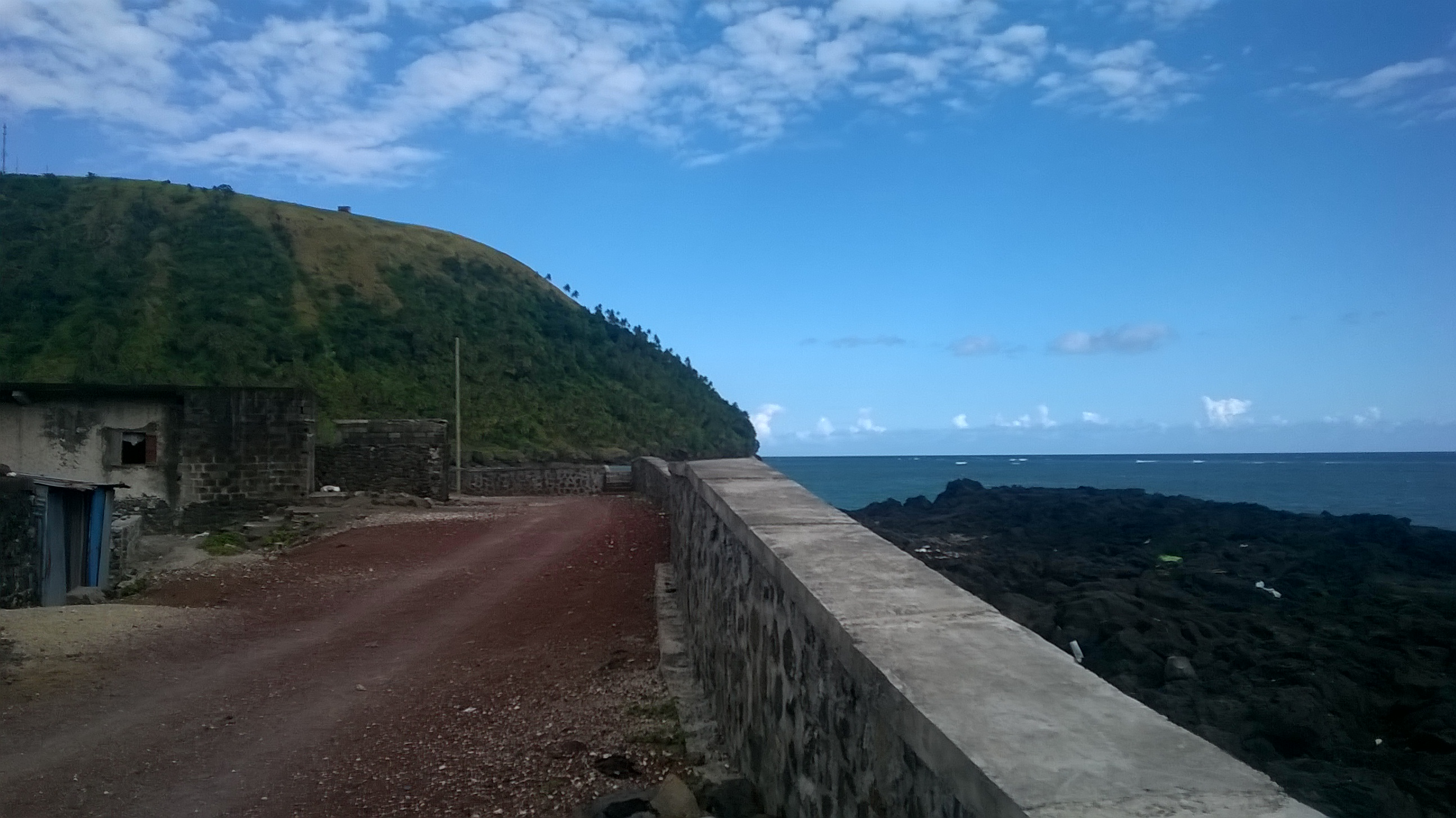
- View of Mbachilé Village
- Interactive map of Mbachilé-Napabo
- Country: Comoros
- Island: Grande Comore

Population (1991)
  - Total: 975
- Time zone: UTC+3 (EAT)

Mbachilé-Napabo is a village on the island of Grande Comore (Ngazidja) in the Comoros. According to the 1991 census, the village had a population of 975.
