= Vouvouni =

Coordinates: 11°45′S 43°15′E

- Village
- Interactive map of Vouvouni
- Country: Comoros
- Island: Grande Comore

Population (1991)
  - Total: 1,906
- Time zone: UTC+3 (EAT)

Vouvouni is a village on the island of Grande Comore in the Comoros. According to the 1991 census the village had a population of 1906.
