= Samba-Mbondoni =

Village on Grande Comore Island, Comoros

Coordinates: 11°40′44″S 43°16′39″E

- Village
- Interactive map of Samba-Mbondoni
- Country: Comoros
- Island: Grande Comore

Population (1991)
  - Total: 911
- Time zone: UTC+3 (EAT)

Samba-Mbondoni is a village on the island of Grande Comore in the Comoros. According to the 1991 census the village had a population of 911.
