= Moidzaza Mboini =

Moindzaza-Mboini
- Village
- Interactive map of Moindzaza-Mboini
- Country: Comoros
- Island: Grande Comore

Population (1991)
  - Total: 1,785
- Time zone: UTC+3 (EAT)

Moindzaza Mboini is a village on the island of Grande Comore (Ngazidja) in the Comoros. According to the 1991 census, the village had a population of 1785.
