= Komoni =

Komoni may refer to:

- Komoni, Comoros
- Komoni, Iran
