= Domoni ya Djou =

Coordinates: 11°29′13″S 43°16′08″E

- Village
- Interactive map of Domoni ya Djou
- Country: Comoros
- Island: Grande Comore

Population (1991)
  - Total: 778
- Time zone: UTC+3 (EAT)

Domoni ya Djou is a village on the island of Grande Comore (Ngazidja) in the Comoros. According to the 1991 census, the village had a population of 778.
