= Patsy (disambiguation) =

Patsy is a feminine (sometimes masculine) given name or nickname.

Patsy may also refer to:

== Places ==
- Patsy, Missouri, a community in the United States
- Patsy, Comoros, a village on the island of Anjouan in the Comoros
- 3310 Patsy, a main-belt asteroid

== Entertainment ==
- Patsy (1917 film), directed by John G. Adolfi
- Patsy (1921 film), directed by John McDermott
- The Patsy (1928 film), directed by King Vidor
- The Patsy (1964 film), starring Jerry Lewis
- PATSY Award, the Picture Animal Top Star of the Year

== Other uses ==
- Patsy, a colloquial phrase with meaning and usage comparable to "fall guy"
- Patsy, a 2019 novel by Nicole Dennis-Benn
- Patsy's, a New York City restaurant
- Patsy, a doll line created in 1928, sold by the Effanbee Doll Company (later the Tonner Doll Company)
- List of storms named Patsy, tropical cyclones worldwide with this name
