= Itsinkoundi =

Coordinates: 11°35′01″S 43°22′33″E

- Village
- Interactive map of Itsinkoundi
- Country: Comoros
- Island: Grande Comore

Population (1991)
  - Total: 1,883
- Time zone: UTC+3 (EAT)

Itsinkoundi is a village on the island of Grande Comore (Ngazidja) in the Comoros. According to the 1991 census, the village had a population of 1883.
