= Kandzilé-Mdjoihaya =

Village on Grande Comore Island, Comoros

Coordinates: 11°51′32″S 43°23′30″E

- Village
- Interactive map of Kandzilé-Mdjoihaya
- Country: Comoros
- Island: Grande Comore

Population (1991)
  - Total: 957
- Time zone: UTC+3 (EAT)

Kandzilé-Mdjoihaya is a village on the island of Grande Comore (Ngazidja) in the Comoros. According to the 1991 census, the village had a population of 957.
