= Mmnoungou =

Mnoungou
- Village
- Location in Grande Comore
- Coordinates: 11.523°S 43.385°E
- Country: Comoros
- Island: Grande Comore

Population (1991)
  - Total: 762
- Time zone: UTC+3 (EAT)

Mnoungou is a village on the island of Grande Comore (Ngazidja) in the Comoros. According to the 1991 census, the village had a population of 762.
