= Dimadjou-Mdé =

- Village
- Interactive map of Dimadjou-Mdé
- Coordinates: 11.476°S 43.374°E
- Country: Comoros
- Island: Grande Comore

Population (1991)
  - Total: 665
- Time zone: UTC+3 (EAT)

Dimadjou-Mdé is a village on the island of Grande Comore (Ngazidja) in the Comoros. According to the 1991 census, the village had a population of 665.
