= Panda, Comoros =

Coordinates: 11°52′S 43°23′E

Panda
- Village
- Interactive map of Panda
- Country: Comoros
- Island: Grande Comore

Population (1991)
  - Total: 677
- Time zone: UTC+3 (EAT)

Panda is a village on the island of Grande Comore in the Comoros. According to the 1991 census the village had a population of 677.
