= Bangoi-Mafousa Nkoa =

Coordinates: 11.7167°S 43.3681°E

- Village
- Interactive map of Bangoi-Mafousa Nkoa
- Country: Comoros
- Island: Grande Comore

Population (1991)
  - Total: 668
- Time zone: UTC+3 (EAT)

Bangoi-Mafousa Nkoa is a village on the island of Grande Comore (Ngazidja) in the Comoros. According to the 1991 census, the village had a population of 668.
