= Shisiwani National Park =

National park in the Comoros

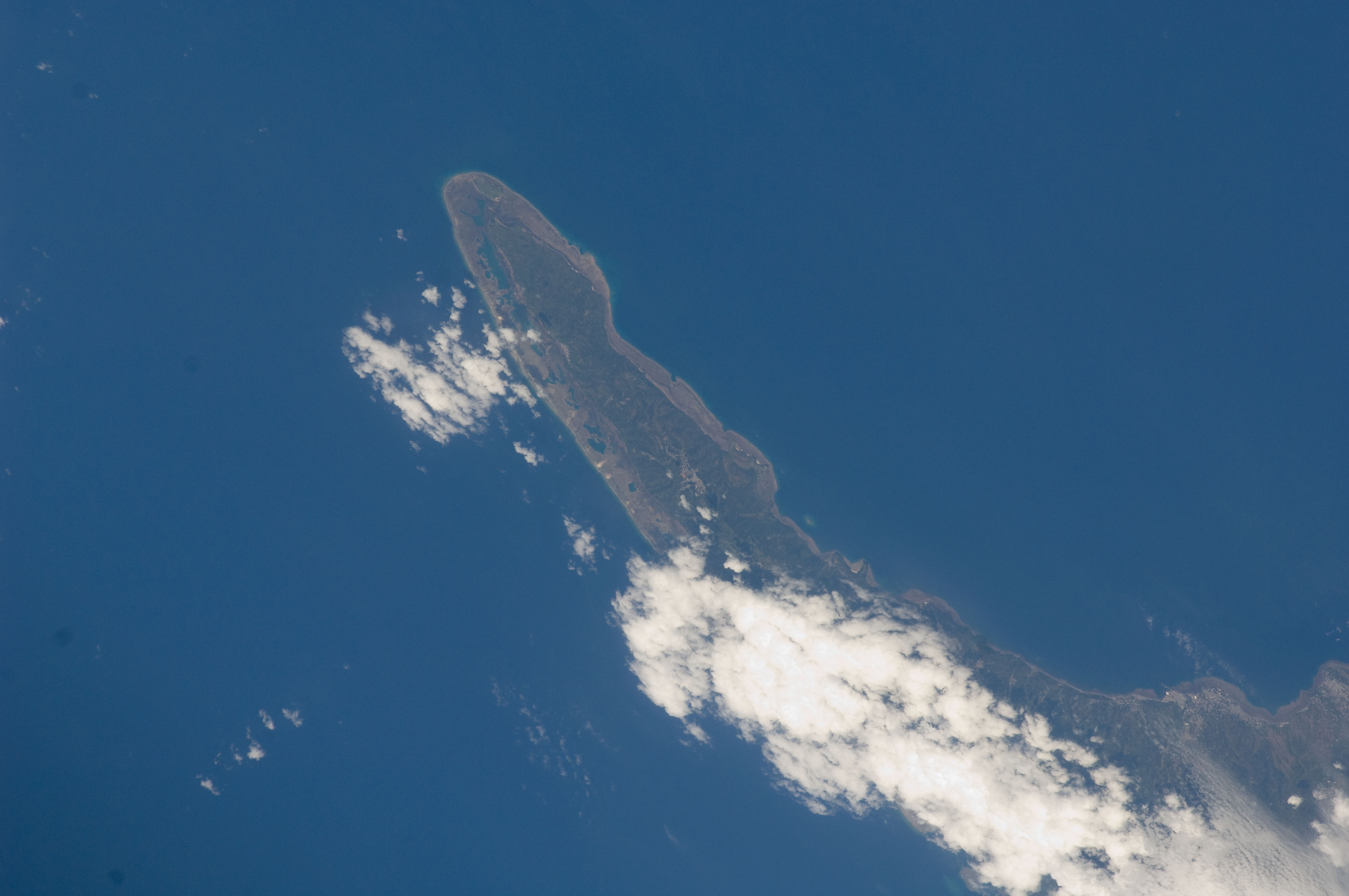
- West arm of the island of Anjouan including the whole park area
- Interactive map of Shisiwani National Park
- Location: Anjouan, Comoros
- Nearest city: Bimbini
- Coordinates: 12°9′55.7″S 44°12′10.1″E
- Area: 6,497 ha (25.09 sq mi)
- Designation: 2016 National Park
- Operator: The Comoros National Parks Agency

Shisiwani National Park (French: Parc National Shisiwani) is a national park along the Sima Peninsula in the eastern Comoros. It includes marine, coastal, and terrestrial areas along the western arm of the island of Anjouan. Its creation was announced in 2016 as part of a government effort to protect 25% of the Comoros by 2021. The park encompasses a saddle island and Ile de la selle off the tip of the peninsula and includes a significant coral reef and mangrove forest. This park is home to rare wildlife species, including lemurs, giant tortoises, and countless bird species.
