= Mitsoudjé-Troumbeni =

Coordinates: 11.7000°S 43.2600°E

- Town
- Interactive map of Mitsoudjé-Troumbeni
- Country: Comoros
- Island: Grande Comore
- Time zone: UTC+3 (EAT)

Mitsoudjé-Troumbeni is a town on the island of Grande Comore (Ngazidja) in the Comoros. According to the 1991 census, the town had a population of 2946.
