= Bambadjani =

- Village
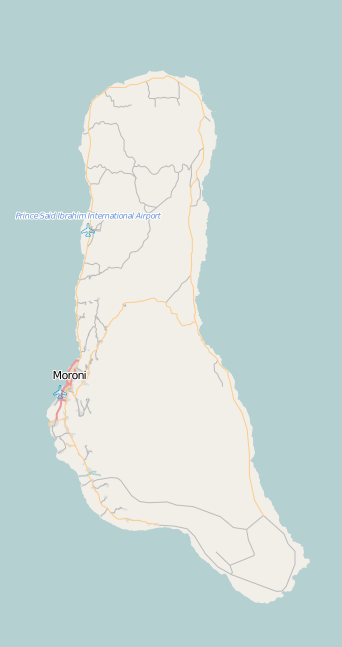
- Location in Grand Comore
- Coordinates: 11°28′56″S 43°23′15″E
- Country: Comoros
- Island: Grande Comore

Population (1991)
  - Total: 1,020
- Time zone: UTC+3 (EAT)

Bambadjani is a village on the island of Grande Comore (Ngazidja) in the Comoros. According to the 1991 census, the village had a population of 1020. Bouni lies to the east of the village on the coast.
