= Mitsamiouli =

Town in Comoros

Coordinates: 11°23′S 43°17′E

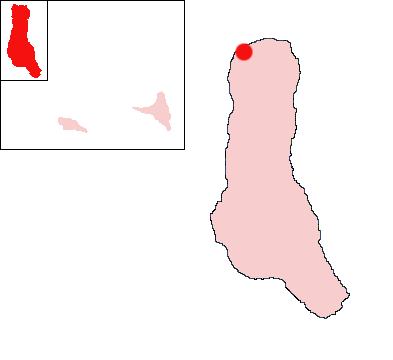
Location of Mitsamihuli on the island of Grande Comore

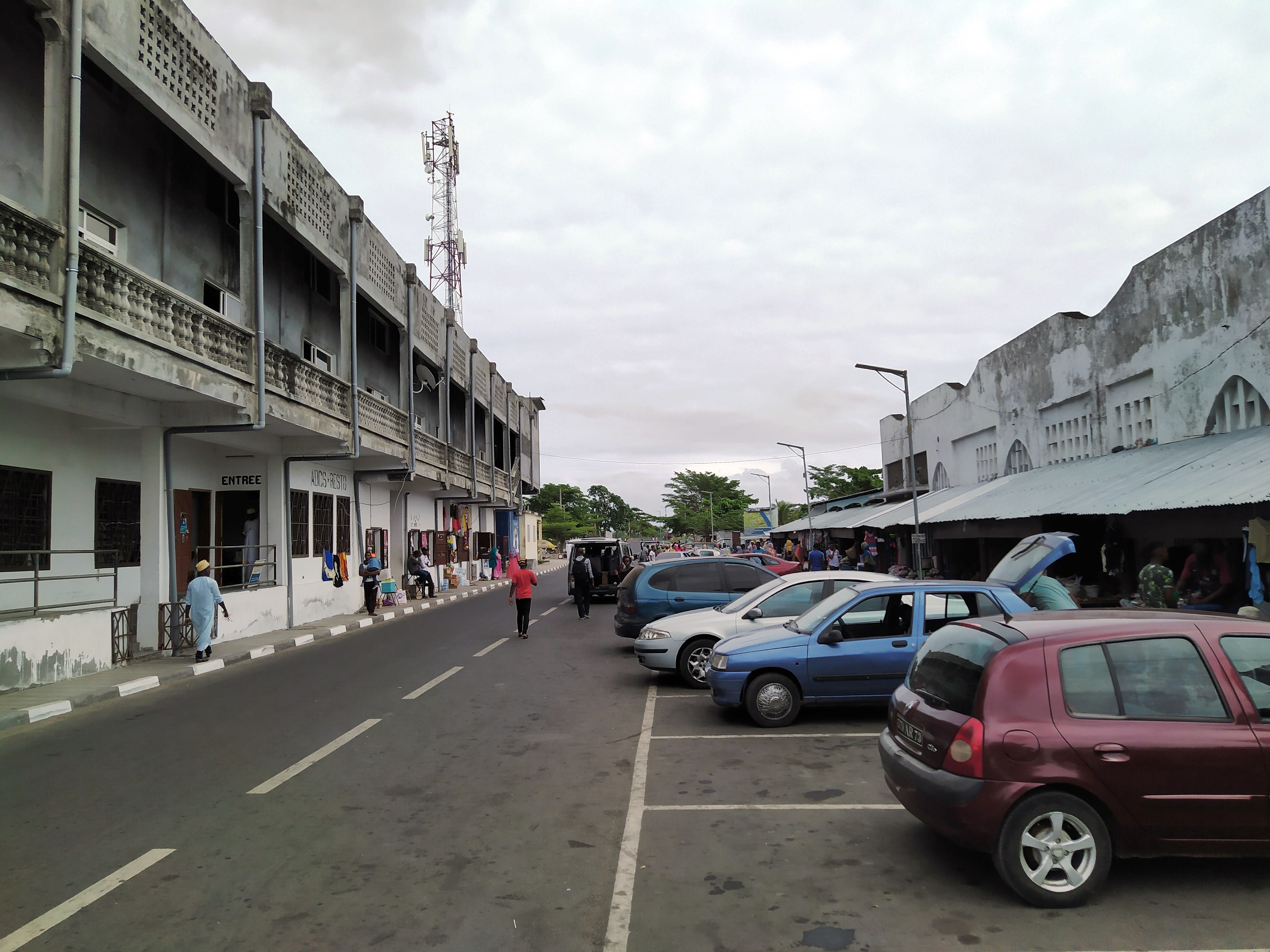
A street in Mitsamihuli

Mitsamihuli (population 6,100) is a town on the northwest coast of Grande Comore in the Comoros.

== History ==
On 23 November 1996, Ethiopian Airlines Flight 961 made a crash-landing in the shallow waters 500 meters (1,600 ft) offshore from Le Galawa Beach Hotel in Mitsamihuli. Of the 175 passengers, 125 died, despite rescue attempts by island residents and tourists.

== Geography ==
Mitsamihuli lies on the northwest coast of the island, along the main coast road RN-1 and RN-3. This coastal road connects it to Djomani and Ntsaouéni further to the south on the west coast and Ivoini on the northeast coast. The RR 122 road runs south from Mitsamihuli and leads to the village of Bangoi Mafsankoa further inland, which has its own mosque. Lac Sale Crater – Lac Sale is an ancient volcano crater, near Mitsamihuli, filled with sea water.

== Economy ==
Tourism is important in the area, particularly from European honeymooners. Fishing is also practiced in Mitsamihuli.

== Notable people ==
Djoueria Abdallah, the first female member of the Assembly of the Union of the Comoros and the singer Chamsia Sagaf came from this town.
