= Maouéni-Ladjiri =

Village on Grande Comore Island, Comoros

Coordinates: 11°28′03″S 43°19′31″E

- Village
- Interactive map of Maouéni-Ladjiri
- Country: Comoros
- Island: Grande Comore

Population (1991)
  - Total: 791
- Time zone: UTC+3 (EAT)

Maouéni-Ladjiri is a village on the island of Grande Comore (Ngazidja) in the Comoros. According to the 1991 census, the village had a population of 791.
