= Djoumoichongo-Nyoumbadjou =

Coordinates: 11°48′25″S 43°17′10″E

- Village
- Interactive map of Djoumoichongo-Nyoumbadjou
- Country: Comoros
- Island: Grande Comore

Population (1991)
  - Total: 1,632
- Time zone: UTC+3 (EAT)

Djoumoichongo-Nyoumbadjou is a village on the island of Grande Comore (Ngazidja) in the Comoros. According to the 1991 census, the village had a population of 1632.
