= Moujimvia =

- Village
- Country: Comoros
- Island: Anjouan

Population (1991)
  - Total: 700
- Time zone: UTC+3 (EAT)

Moujimvia is a village on the island of Anjouan in the Comoros. According to the 1991 census the village had a population of 700.
