= Magnassini =

- Village
- Location in Comoros
- Coordinates: 12.17°S 44.44°E
- Country: Comoros
- Island: Anjouan

Population (1991)
  - Total: 2,628
- Time zone: UTC+3 (EAT)

Magnassini is a village on the island of Anjouan in the Comoros. According to the 1991 census the village had a population of 2,628.
