= Douniani =

Coordinates: 11°25′S 43°17′E

- Village
- Interactive map of Douniani
- Country: Comoros
- Island: Grande Comore

Population (1991)
  - Total: 1,338
- Time zone: UTC+3 (EAT)

Douniani is a village on the island of Grande Comore (Ngazidja) in the Comoros. According to the 1991 census, the village had a population of 1338.
