= Mavingouni =

Coordinates: 11°43′S 43°15′E

- Village
- Interactive map of Mavingouni
- Country: Comoros
- Island: Grande Comore

Population (1991)
  - Total: 1,046
- Time zone: UTC+3 (EAT)

Mavingouni is a village on the island of Grande Comore (Ngazidja) in the Comoros. According to the 1991 census, the village had a population of 1046. Mavingouni is located 2.7 kilometers from the country's capital, Moroni.
