= Nioumamilima =

Coordinates: 11°51′S 43°26′E

Nioumamilima Badjini Est
- Village
- Motto: 11°51C
- Interactive map of Nioumamilima
- Country: Comoros
- Island: Grande Comore
- Chief of the village: Ibrahim Toiha

Government
  - Maire: Ahmed Kaamyl

Population (2018)
  - Total: 15,000
  - Metro density: 13,000/sq mi (5,000/km^{2})
- Time zone: UTC+3 (EAT)

Nioumamilima is a village on the island of Grande Comore (Ngazidja) in the Comoros.

Many inhabitants of this village were removed to larger cities where Arabs had settled. The main objective of this move was to teach them Islam and Islamic philosophy. Comorian historians attribute these teachings to either Iranians or Shirazis. After this schooling, the villagers returned to Nioumamilima and built Koranic schools and mosques. The locals called them village fighters. The village now includes 27 mosques and 5 Koranic schools.

It is one of the most agriculturally prosperous areas in the Badjini region, producing crops which include vanilla and cloves. In 2014, there were more than 500 young people involved in the agricultural sector. Some have preferred to leave school to invest in agriculture. According to the 2008 census, the village had a population of 3000.
