= Zivandani =

Coordinates: 11°39′S 43°16′E

- Village
- Interactive map of Zivandani
- Country: Comoros
- Island: Grande Comore

Population (1991)
  - Total: 734
- Time zone: UTC+3 (EAT)

Zivandani is a village on the island of Grande Comore in the Comoros. According to the 1991 census the village had a population of 734.
