= Idjinkoundzi =

Coordinates: 11°42′40″S 43°24′50″E

- Village
- Interactive map of Idjinkoundzi
- Country: Comoros
- Island: Grande Comore

Population (1991)
  - Total: 1,476
- Time zone: UTC+3 (EAT)

Idjinkoundzi is a village on the island of Grande Comore (Ngazidja) in the Comoros. According to the 1991 census, the village had a population of 1476.
