= Chandra, Comoros =

Chandra
- Village
- Location in Comoros
- Coordinates: 12°12′S 44°28′E
- Country: Comoros
- Island: Anjouan

Population (2009 (est.))
  - Total: 6,179
- Time zone: UTC+3 (EAT)

Chandra is a village on the island of Anjouan in the Comoros. According to the 1991 census, the village had a population of 3,511. The current estimate for 2009 is 6,179 people.
