= Ifoundihé Chamboini =

Coordinates: 11°54′01″S 43°24′44″E

- Village
- Interactive map of Ifoundihé Chamboini
- Country: Comoros
- Island: Grande Comore

Population (1991)
  - Total: 715
- Time zone: UTC+3 (EAT)

Ifoundihé Chamboini is a village on the island of Grande Comore (Ngazidja) in the Comoros. According to the 1991 census, the village had a population of 715.
