= Gnambo Mouro =

Village on Anjouan Island, Comoros

Coordinates: 12°21′09″S 44°30′44″E

- Village
- Interactive map of Gnambo Mouro
- Country: Comoros
- Island: Anjouan

Population (2009 (est.))
  - Total: 2,601
- Time zone: UTC+3 (EAT)

Gnambo Mouro is a village on the island of Anjouan in the Comoros. According to the 1991 census the town had a population of 1,477. The current estimate for 2009 is 2,601 people
