= Vanamboini =

Coordinates: 11°37′S 43°15′E

- Village
- Interactive map of Vanamboini
- Country: Comoros
- Island: Grande Comore

Population (2012)
  - Total: 4,300
- Time zone: UTC+3 (EAT)

Vanamboini is a village on the island of Grande Comore in the Comoros. According to the 1991 census the village had a population of 1245.
