= Dzoidjou =

Coordinates: 11°49′59″S 43°22′26″E

- Village
- Interactive map of Dzoidjou
- Country: Comoros
- Island: Grande Comore

Population (1991)
  - Total: 638
- Time zone: UTC+3 (EAT)

Dzoidjou is a village on the island of Grande Comore (Ngazidja) in the Comoros. According to the 1991 census, the village had a population of 638.
