= Dawiat Mohamed =

Comoros politician

Dawiat Mohamed (born 1979) is a Comorian politician.

Mohamed has been a member of the Assembly of the Union of the Comoros for Hambou since 2020.
