= Bandamadji-Ladomba =

- Village
- Location in Comoros
- Coordinates: 11°47′04″S 043°26′40″E
- Country: Comoros
- Island: Grande Comore

Population (1991)
  - Total: 1,313
- Time zone: UTC+3 (EAT)

Bandamadji-Ladomba is a village on the island of Grande Comore (Ngazidja) in the Comoros. According to the 1991 census, the village had a population of 1313.
