= Jimlimi =

- Village
- Location in Comoros
- Coordinates: 12.1700°S 44.4400°E
- Country: Comoros
- Island: Anjouan

Population (2009 (est.))
  - Total: 5,335
- Time zone: UTC+3 (EAT)

Jimlimi is a village on the island of Anjouan in the Comoros. According to the 1991 census the town had a population of 3,031. The current estimate for 2009 is 5,335 people
