= Ouzinii =

- Village
- Interactive map of Ouzinii
- Country: Comoros
- Island: Anjouan

Population (1991)
  - Total: 1,173
- Time zone: UTC+3 (EAT)

Ouzinii is a village on the island of Anjouan in the Comoros. According to the 1991 census the village had a population of 1173.
