= Bandra Lamahalé =

- Town
- Location in Comoros
- Country: Comoros
- Island: Anjouan

Population (2009 (est.))
  - Total: 2,695
- Time zone: UTC+3 (EAT)

Bandra Lamahalé is a small town on the island of Anjouan in the Comoros. According to the 1991 census the town had a population of 1,531. The current estimate for 2009 is 2,695 people.
