= Bahani =

- Village
- Location in Comoros
- Coordinates: 11°38′S 043°17′E
- Country: Comoros
- Island: Grande Comore

Population (1991)
  - Total: 958
- Time zone: UTC+3 (EAT)

Bahani is a village on the island of Grande Comore (Ngazidja) in the Comoros. According to the 1991 census, the village had a population of 958.
