= Ouhozi =

Coordinates: 11°24′S 43°17′E

- Village
- Interactive map of Ouhozi
- Country: Comoros
- Island: Grande Comore

Population (1991)
  - Total: 1,452
- Time zone: UTC+3 (EAT)

Ouhozi is a village on the island of Grande Comore in the Comoros. According to the 1991 census the village had a population of 1452.
