= Koua, Comoros =

Village on Grande Comore Island, Comoros

Coordinates: 11°24′19″S 43°20′50″E

Koua
- Village
- Interactive map of Koua
- Country: Comoros
- Island: Grande Comore

Population (1991)
  - Total: 1,047
- Time zone: UTC+3 (EAT)

Koua is a village on the island of Grande Comore (Ngazidja) in the Comoros. According to the 1991 census, the village had a population of 1047.
