= Founga-Anihani =

Coordinates: 11°24′39″S 43°17′43″E

- Village
- Interactive map of Founga-Anihani
- Country: Comoros
- Island: Grande Comore

Population (1991)
  - Total: 733
- Time zone: UTC+3 (EAT)

Founga-Anihani is a village on the island of Grande Comore (Ngazidja) in the Comoros. According to the 1991 census, the village had a population of 733.
