= Ongoni =

- Village
- Location in Comoros
- Coordinates: 12°10′33″S 44°30′28″E
- Country: Comoros
- Island: Anjouan

Population (1991)
  - Total: 1,280
- Time zone: UTC+3 (EAT)

Ongoni is a village on the island of Anjouan in the Comoros. According to the 1991 census the village had a population of 1280.
