= Hambou =

- Prefecture
- Interactive map of Hambou
- Coordinates: 11°50′09″S 43°18′45″E
- Country: Comoros
- Island: Grande Comore

Population (1991)
  - Total: 753
- Time zone: UTC+3 (EAT)

Hambou is a village on the island of Grande Comore (Ngazidja) in the Comoros. According to the 1991 census, the village had a population of 753.

Dawiat Mohamed was a member of the Assembly of the Union of the Comoros for Hambou from 2020 to 2025.
