= Bada la Djandza =

Village on Anjouan Island, Comoros

Coordinates: 12°18′10″S 44°29′50″E

- Village
- Location in Comoros
- Country: Comoros
- Island: Anjouan

Population (2009 (est.))
  - Total: 1,011
- Time zone: UTC+3 (EAT)

Bada la Djandza is a village on the island of Anjouan in the Comoros. According to the 1991 census the town had a population of 525. The current estimate for 2009 is 1,011 people.
