= Bandrani-Mtangani =

Coordinates: 12°11′20″S 44°20′31″E

- Village
- Interactive map of Bandrani-Mtangani
- Country: Comoros
- Island: Anjouan

Population (2009 (est.))
  - Total: 3,486
- Time zone: UTC+3 (EAT)

Bandrani-Mtangani is a village on the island of Anjouan in the Comoros. According to the 1991 census the village had a population of 1,981. The current estimate for 2009 is 3,486 people
