= Ivémbéni-Bandasamoulini =

Coordinates: 11°28′40″S 43°19′05″E

- Village
- Interactive map of Ivémbéni-Bandasamoulini
- Country: Comoros
- Island: Grande Comore

Population (1991)
  - Total: 2,806
- Time zone: UTC+3 (EAT)

Ivémbéni-Bandasamoulini is a village on the island of Grande Comore (Ngazidja) in the Comoros. According to the 1991 census, the village had a population of 2806.
