= Moidja =

Coordinates: 11.4680°S 43.2870°E

- Village
- Interactive map of Moidja
- Country: Comoros
- Island: Grande Comore

Population (1991)
  - Total: 1,597
- Time zone: UTC+3 (EAT)

Moidja is a village on the island of Grande Comore (Ngazidja) in the Comoros. According to the 1991 census, the village had a population of 1597.
