= Salimani =

- Village
- Interactive map of Salimani
- Coordinates: 11.810°S 43.269°E
- Country: Comoros
- Island: Grande Comore

Population (1991)
  - Total: 1,250
- Time zone: UTC+3 (EAT)

Salimani is a village on the island of Grande Comore in the Comoros. According to the 1991 census, the village had a population of 1250.
