= Ouzioini =

- Village
- Country: Comoros
- Island: Grand Comoro

Population (1991)
  - Total: 1,857
- Time zone: UTC+3 (EAT)

Ouzioini is a village on the island of Grand Comoro in the Comoros. At the time of the 1991 census the village had a population of 1857.
