= Dzidri-I =

- Village
- Location in Comoros
- Coordinates: 12°13′12″S 44°27′00″E
- Country: Comoros
- Island: Anjouan

Population (2009 (est.))
  - Total: 2,601
- Time zone: UTC+3 (EAT)

Dzidri-I is a village on the island of Anjouan in the Comoros. According to the 1991 census the town had a population of 1,478. The current estimate for 2009 is 2,601 people
