= Chamlé =

Coordinates: 11°26′55.81″S 43°16′34.85″E

- Village
- Interactive map of Chamlé
- Country: Comoros
- Island: Grande Comore

Population (1991)
  - Total: 886
- Time zone: UTC+3 (EAT)

Chamlé is a village on the island of Grande Comore (Ngazidja) in the Comoros. According to the 1991 census, the village had a population of 886.
