= Mromadji =

Village on Anjouan Island, Comoros

Coordinates: 12°12′25″S 44°30′38″E

- Village
- Interactive map of Mromadji
- Country: Comoros
- Island: Anjouan

Population (1991)
  - Total: 1,345
- Time zone: UTC+3 (EAT)

Mromadji is a village on the island of Anjouan in the Comoros. According to the 1991 census the village had a population of 1,345.
