= Mbambao Mtsanga =

Coordinates: 12°18′36″S 44°26′24″E

- Village
- Interactive map of Mbambao Mtsanga
- Country: Comoros
- Island: Anjouan

Population (1991)
  - Total: 3,534
- Time zone: UTC+3 (EAT)

Mbambao Mtsanga is a village on the island of Anjouan in the Comoros. According to the 1991 census the village had a population of 3,534.
