= Héléindjé-Salimani-Zounda =

Coordinates: 11°26′13″S 43°18′18″E

- Village
- Interactive map of Héléindjé-Salimani-Zounda
- Country: Comoros
- Island: Grande Comore

Population (1991)
  - Total: 1,157
- Time zone: UTC+3 (EAT)

Héléindjé-Salimani-Zounda is a village on the island of Grande Comore (Ngazidja) in the Comoros. According to the 1991 census, the village had a population of 1157.
