= Bandajou =

Coordinates: 12°11′S 44°17′E

- Village
- Interactive map of Bandajou
- Country: Comoros
- Island: Anjouan

Population (2009 (est.))
  - Total: 1,988
- Time zone: UTC+3 (EAT)

Bandajou is a village on the island of Anjouan in the Comoros. According to the 1991 census the town had a population of 1,129. The current estimate for 2009 is 1,988 people
