= Dimadjou =

Coordinates: 11°28′25″S 43°21′52″E

- Village
- Interactive map of Dimadjou
- Country: Comoros
- Island: Grande Comore

Population (1991)
  - Total: 1,089
- Time zone: UTC+3 (EAT)

Dimadjou is a village on the island of Grande Comore (Ngazidja) in the Comoros. According to the 1991 census, the village had a population of 1089.
