= Simamboini =

Village on Grande Comore Island, Comoros

Coordinates: 11°55′08″S 43°28′13″E

- Village
- Interactive map of Simamboini
- Country: Comoros
- Island: Grande Comore

Population (1991)
  - Total: 619
- Time zone: UTC+3 (EAT)

Simamboini is a village on the island of Grande Comore in the Comoros. According to the 1991 census the village had a population of 619.
