= Djomani-Mchenazi =

Coordinates: 11°25′49″S 43°15′34″E

- Village
- Interactive map of Djomani-Mchenazi
- Country: Comoros
- Island: Grande Comore

Population (1991)
  - Total: 1,995
- Time zone: UTC+3 (EAT)

Djomani-Mchenazi is a village on the island of Grande Comore (Ngazidja) in the Comoros. According to the 1991 census, the village had a population of 1995.
