= Heroumbili =

Coordinates: 11°33′S 43°23′E

- Village
- Interactive map of Heroumbili
- Country: Comoros
- Island: Grande Comore

Population (1991)
  - Total: 1,101
- Time zone: UTC+3 (EAT)

Heroumbili is a village on the island of Grande Comore (Ngazidja) in the Comoros. According to the 1991 census, the village had a population of 1101.
