= Koki, Comoros =

Coordinates: 12°10′S 44°26′E

Koki
- Village
- Interactive map of Koki
- Country: Comoros
- Island: Anjouan

Population (2012 (est.))
  - Total: 5,866
- Time zone: UTC+3 (EAT)

Koki is a village on the island of Anjouan in the Comoros. According to the 1991 census the village had a population of 3,066. The current calculation for 2012 is 5,866 people
