= Koua =

Koua may refer to:

- Koua, Comoros, a village in Grande Comore, Comoros
- Koua, Ivory Coast, a town in Montagnes District, Ivory Coast
- Koua River, a river in New Caledonia
- KOUA, a satellite station of KGOU broadcasting from Ada, Oklahoma, United States
- Franck Brice Koua (born 2001), Italian hurdler
- Vivien Assie Koua (born 1992), Ivorian footballer
