= Tsidjé =

Town in Comoros

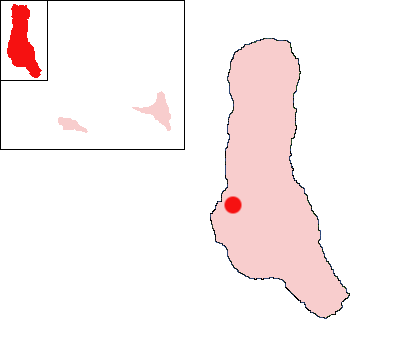
- Location of Tsidjé on the island of Grande Comore

- The location of Tsidjé in Comoros
- Coordinates: 11°42′S 43°16′E
- Country: Comoros
- Island: Grand Comore
- Time zone: UTC+3 (East Africa Time)

Tsidjé is a town located on the island of Grande Comore in the Comoros. It is located 2.98 miles (4.8 km) from the country's capital, Moroni.
