= Bandrani =

Coordinates: 12.0730°S 44.4710°E

- Village
- Interactive map of Bandrani
- Country: Comoros
- Island: Anjouan

Population (2009 (est.))
  - Total: 1,399
- Time zone: UTC+3 (EAT)

Bandrani is a village on the island of Anjouan in the Comoros. According to the 1991 census the village had a population of 760. The current estimate for 2009 is 1,339 people
