= Hantsindzi =

Coordinates: 11°26′S 43°24′E

- Village
- Interactive map of Hantsindzi
- Country: Comoros
- Island: Grande Comore

Population (1991)
  - Total: 1,508
- Time zone: UTC+3 (EAT)

Hantsindzi is a village on the island of Grande Comore (Ngazidja) in the Comoros. According to the 1991 census, the village had a population of 1508.
