= Maouéni =

Village in the Comoros

Coordinates: 11.467°S 43.325°E

- Village
- Interactive map of Maouéni
- Country: Comoros
- Island: Grande Comore

Population (1991)
  - Total: 865
- Time zone: UTC+3 (EAT)

Maouéni is a village on the island of Grande Comore in the Comoros. According to the 1991 census, the village had a population of 865.
