= Bambani =

Coordinates: 11.4822°S 43.3876°E

- Village
- Interactive map of Bambani
- Country: Comoros
- Island: Grande Comore

Population (1991)
  - Total: 800
- Time zone: UTC+3 (EAT)

Bambani is a village on the island of Grande Comore (Ngazidja) in the Comoros. According to the 1991 census, the village had a population of 800.
