= Vanadjou =

- Village
- Location in Comoros
- Coordinates: 11°36′38.69″S 43°17′8.41″E
- Country: Comoros
- Island: Grande Comore

Population (1991)
  - Total: 1,377
- Time zone: UTC+3 (EAT)

Vanadjou is a village on the island of Grande Comore in the Comoros. According to the 1991 census the village had a population of 1,377.
