= Ourovéni =

Coordinates: 11°55′S 43°29′E

- Village
- Interactive map of Ourovéni
- Country: Comoros
- Island: Grande Comore

Population (1991)
  - Total: 1,068
- Time zone: UTC+3 (EAT)

Ourovéni is a village on the island of Grande Comore in the Comoros. According to the 1991 census the village had a population of 1068.
