= Mtsamdou =

Coordinates: 11°36′S 43°23′E

- Village
- Interactive map of Mtsamdou
- Country: Comoros
- Island: Grande Comore

Population (1991)
  - Total: 881
- Time zone: UTC+3 (EAT)

Mtsamdou is a village on the island of Grande Comore (Ngazidja) in the Comoros. According to the 1991 census, the village had a population of 881.
