= Simboussa =

- Village
- Interactive map of Simboussa
- Coordinates: 11.883°S 43.462°E
- Country: Comoros
- Island: Grande Comore

Population (1991)
  - Total: 655
- Time zone: UTC+3 (EAT)

Simboussa is a village on the island of Grande Comore in the Comoros. According to the 1991 census the village had a population of 655.
