= Mjimandra =

Coordinates: 12°11′S 44°22′E

- Village
- Interactive map of Mjimandra
- Country: Comoros
- Island: Anjouan

Population (1991)
  - Total: 1,937
- Time zone: UTC+3 (EAT)

Mjimandra is a village on the island of Anjouan in the Comoros. According to the 1991 census the village had a population of 1,937.
