= Daji, Comoros =

Daji
- Village
- Location in Comoros
- Coordinates: 12°20′S 44°29′E
- Country: Comoros
- Island: Anjouan

Population (2009 (est.))
  - Total: 2,929
- Time zone: UTC+3 (EAT)

Daji is a village on the island of Anjouan in the Comoros. According to the 1991 census, the village had a population of 1,664. The current estimate for 2009 is 2,929 people
