= Ntsoralé =

Coordinates: 11°41′S 43°24′E

- Village
- Interactive map of Ntsoralé
- Country: Comoros
- Island: Grande Comore

Population (1991)
  - Total: 1,711
- Time zone: UTC+3 (EAT)

Ntsoralé is a village on the island of Grande Comore in the Comoros. According to the 1991 census, the village in the Dimani region had a population of 1,711.
