= Chouani =

Village in Grand Comore, Comoros

Coordinates: 11°49′S 43°17′E

- Village
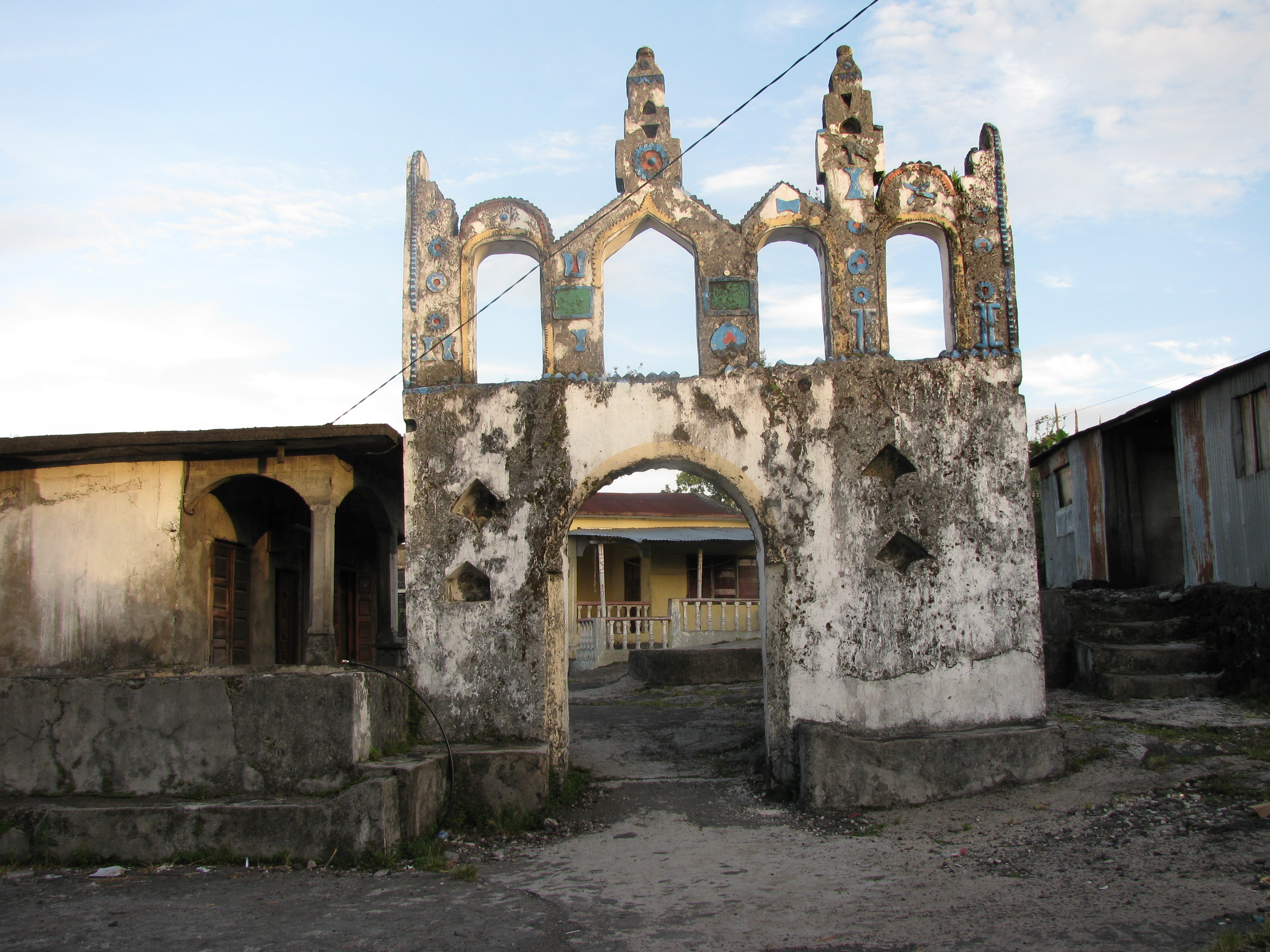
- Ruins of the Chouani minaret
- Interactive map of Chouani
- Country: Comoros
- Island: Grande Comore

Population (1991)
  - Total: 1,723
- Time zone: UTC+3 (EAT)

Chouani is a village on the island of Grande Comore in the Comoros. According to the 1991 census, the village had a population of 1723.
