= Itsandzéni =

Coordinates: 11°28′S 43°23′E

- Village
- Interactive map of Itsandzéni
- Country: Comoros
- Island: Grande Comore

Population (1991)
  - Total: 1,040
- Time zone: UTC+3 (EAT)

Itsandzéni is a village on the island of Grande Comore (Ngazidja) in the Comoros. In 1991, the village had a population of 1040.
