= Ntsoudjini =

Coordinates: 11°40′S 43°16′E

- Village
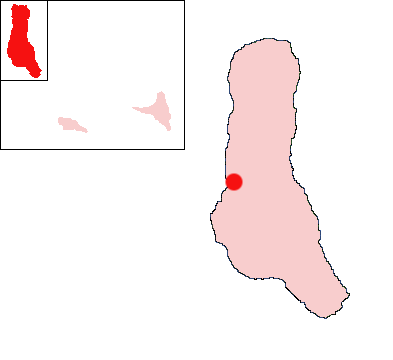
- Location of N'Tsoudjini on the island of Grande Comore
- Country: Comoros
- Island: Grande Comore

Population (1991)
  - Total: 2,652
- Time zone: UTC+3 (EAT)

Ntsoudjini is a village on the island of Grande Comore in the Comoros. Its known as the village where the fr:Préfecture d'Itsandra-Hamanvou is located. According to the 1991 census the village had a population of 2652. ATOMIC NGOME is the name of the fr:Football team if this village Footballer, Kassim Hadji was born in Ntsoudjini.
