= Tsinimoichongo =

Village on Grande Comore Island, Comoros

Coordinates: 11°51′00″S 43°22′44″E

- Village
- Interactive map of Tsinimoichongo
- Country: Comoros
- Island: Grande Comore

Population (1991)
  - Total: 2,129
- Time zone: UTC+3 (EAT)

Tsinimoichongo is a village on the island of Grande Comore in the Comoros. According to the 1991 census the village had a population of 2129.
