= Ouallah =

Human settlement in Comoros

Coordinates: 12°20′S 43°40′E

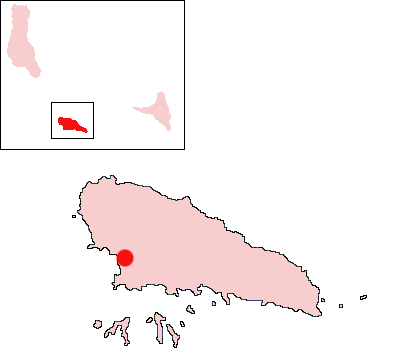
Location of Ouallah on the island of Mohéli

Ouallah is a town located on the island of Mohéli in the Comoros. It is part of the Comoros archipelago in the Indian Ocean. Mohéli is the smallest of the three main islands in Comoros, and Ouallah is one of its coastal settlements.

The town's economy is primarily based on fishing and agriculture, with local farmers growing crops such as coconuts, cassava, and bananas. Ouallah benefits from the island's biodiversity, which includes marine life and forested areas.

The population in Ouallah, like much of Mohéli, leads a rural lifestyle, with limited infrastructure and access to services compared to the larger islands of Grande Comore and Anjouan.
