= Kowé-Cosini =

Village on Anjouan Island, Comoros

Coordinates: 12°17′10″S 44°25′06″E

- Village
- Interactive map of Kowé-Cosini
- Country: Comoros
- Island: Anjouan

Population (1991)
  - Total: 1,150
- Time zone: UTC+3 (EAT)

Kowé-Cosini is a village on the island of Anjouan in the Comoros. According to the 1991 census the village had a population of 1,150.
