= Hadjambou =

Coordinates: 11°44′09″S 43°14′00″E

- Village
- Interactive map of Hadjambou
- Country: Comoros
- Island: Grande Comore

Population (1991)
  - Total: 792
- Time zone: UTC+3 (EAT)

Hadjambou is a village on the island of Grande Comore (Ngazidja) in the Comoros. According to the 1991 census, the village had a population of 792.
