= Singani, Comoros =

Singani
- Town
- Location of Singani, Comoros
- Coordinates: 11°50′44″S 43°18′33″E
- Country: Comoros
- Autonomous island: Grande Comore

Population (2010)
  - Total: 2,552
- Calling Code: +269

Singani is a town on Grande Comore Island in the Comoros.
