= Ndzaouzé =

Coordinates: 11°24′S 43°16′E

- Village
- Interactive map of Ndzaouzé
- Country: Comoros
- Island: Grande Comore

Population (1991)
  - Total: 1,586
- Time zone: UTC+3 (EAT)

Ndzaouzé is a village on the island of Grande Comore (Ngazidja) in the Comoros. According to the 1991 census, the village had a population of 1586.
