= Chiroroni =

Coordinates: 12.3769°S 44.5011°E

- Village
- Interactive map of Chiroroni
- Country: Comoros
- Island: Anjouan

Population (1991)
  - Total: 1,323
- Time zone: UTC+3 (EAT)

Chiroroni is a village on the island of Anjouan in the Comoros. According to the 1991 census the village had a population of 1323.
