= Ndrouani =

Village on Grande Comore Island, Comoros

Coordinates: 11°46′03″S 43°15′12″E

- Village
- Interactive map of Ndrouani
- Country: Comoros
- Island: Grande Comore

Population (1991)
  - Total: 728
- Time zone: UTC+3 (EAT)

Ndrouani is a village on the island of Grande Comore (Ngazidja) in the Comoros. According to the 1991 census, the village had a population of 728.
