= Magnassini-Nindri =

Coordinates: 12°17′S 44°25′E

- Village
- Interactive map of Magnassini-Nindri
- Country: Comoros
- Island: Anjouan

Population (1991)
  - Total: 1,376
- Time zone: UTC+3 (EAT)

Magnassini-Nindri is a village on the island of Anjouan in the Comoros. According to the 1991 census the village had a population of 1,376.
