= Chindini =

Coordinates: 11°55′S 43°29′E

- Village
- Interactive map of Chindini
- Country: Comoros
- Island: Grande Comore

Population (1991)
  - Total: 1,107
- Time zone: UTC+3 (EAT)

Chindini is a village on the island of Grande Comore (Ngazidja) in the Comoros. According to the 1991 census, the village had a population of 1,107.
