= Chaouéni =

Coordinates: 12°21′S 44°30′E

- Village
- Interactive map of Chaouéni
- Country: Comoros
- Island: Anjouan

Population (1991)
  - Total: 624
- Time zone: UTC+3 (EAT)

Chaouéni is a village on the island of Anjouan in the Comoros. According to the 1991 census the village had a population of 624.
