= Hajoho =

Coordinates: 12°07′S 44°29′E

- Village
- Interactive map of Hajoho
- Country: Comoros
- Island: Anjouan

Population (2009 (est.))
  - Total: 2,743
- Time zone: UTC+3 (EAT)

Hajoho is a village on the island of Anjouan in the Comoros. According to the 1991 census the town had a population of 1,558. The current estimate for 2009 is 2,743 people
