= Antsahé =

- Village
- Location in Comoros
- Coordinates: 12°21′23″S 44°31′21″E
- Country: Comoros
- Island: Anjouan

Population (2009 (est.))
  - Total: 1,291
- Time zone: UTC+3 (EAT)

Antsahé is a village on the island of Anjouan in the Comoros. According to the 1991 census the town had a population of 734. The current estimate for 2009 is 1,291 people
