= Patsy, Comoros =

Coordinates: 12°09′S 44°26′E

Patsy
- Village
- Interactive map of Patsy
- Country: Comoros
- Island: Anjouan

Population (1991)
  - Total: 932
- Time zone: UTC+3 (EAT)

Patsy is a village on the island of Anjouan in the Comoros. According to the 1991 census, the village had a population of 932.
