= Mandza =

Coordinates: 11°25′S 43°18′E

HELENDJE
- Village
- Interactive map of HELENDJE
- Country: Comoros
- Island: Grande Comore

Population (2021)
  - Total: 21,000
- Time zone: UTC+3 (EAT)

Helendje is a village on the island of Grande Comore (Ngazidja) in the Comoros. According to the 2021 census, the village had a population of 21000.
