= Barakani, Anjouan =

Barakani
- Town
- Location in Comoros
- Coordinates: 12°8′20.71″S 44°25′53.05″E
- Country: Comoros
- Island: Anjouan

Population (2009 (est.))
  - Total: 6,665
- Time zone: UTC+3 (EAT)

Barakani is a small town on the island of Anjouan in the Comoros. According to the 1991 census the town had a population of 3,787. The current estimate for 2009 is 6,665 people.
