= Barakani, Mayotte =

Barakani
- Village
- Location within Mayotte
- Coordinates: 12°50′6″S 45°7′41″E
- Country: France
- Overseas Territory: Mayotte
- Commune: Ouangani

Barakani is a village in the commune of Ouangani on Mayotte.
