= Saandani =

Village on Anjouan Island, Comoros

Coordinates: 12°11′25″S 44°19′58″E

- Village
- Interactive map of Saandani
- Country: Comoros
- Island: Anjouan

Population (1991)
  - Total: 1,291
- Time zone: UTC+3 (EAT)

Saandani is a village on the island of Anjouan in the Comoros. According to the 1991 census the village had a population of 1291.
