= Sambia, Comoros =

Town in Comoros

Coordinates: 12°22′S 43°48′E

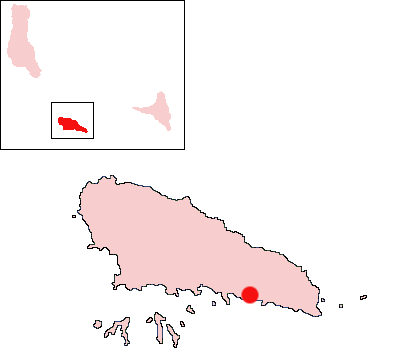
Location of Sambia on the island of Mohéli

Sambia is a town located on the island of Mohéli in the Comoros.
