= Chironkamba =

- Village
- Location in Comoros
- Coordinates: 12°11′37.04″S 44°21′4.72″E
- Country: Comoros
- Island: Anjouan

Population (2009 (est.))
  - Total: 2,617
- Time zone: UTC+3 (EAT)

Chironkamba is a village on the island of Anjouan in the Comoros. According to the 1991 census, the village had a population of 1,487. The current estimate for 2009 is 2,617 people.
