= Mirongani =

Coordinates: 12°11′S 44°15′E

- Village
- Interactive map of Mirongani
- Country: Comoros
- Island: Anjouan

Population (1991)
  - Total: 548
- Time zone: UTC+3 (EAT)

Mirongani is a village on the island of Anjouan in the Comoros. According to the 1991 census the village had a population of 548.
