= Siry-ziroudani =

Human settlement in Mohéli, Comoros

Coordinates: 12°20′S 43°47′E

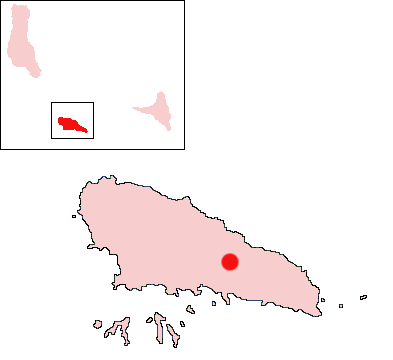
Location of Ziroudani on the island of Mohéli

Siry-ziroudani is a village located on the island of Mohéli in the Comoros.
