= Gnatranga-Moiou =

Coordinates: 12°08′19″S 44°26′11″E

- Village
- Interactive map of Gnatranga-Moiou
- Country: Comoros
- Island: Anjouan

Population (2009 (est.))
  - Total: 2,321
- Time zone: UTC+3 (EAT)

Gnatranga-Moiou is a village on the island of Anjouan in the Comoros. According to the 1991 census the town had a population of 1,318. The current estimate for 2009 is 2,321 people
