= Bazimini =

- Town
- Location in Comoros
- Coordinates: 12°11′S 44°27′E
- Country: Comoros
- Island: Anjouan

Population (2009 (est.))
  - Total: 8,952
- Time zone: UTC+3 (EAT)

Bazimini or Bazmini is a small town on the island of Anjouan in the Comoros. According to the 1991 census the town had a population of 5,087. The current estimate for 2009 is 8,952 people
