= Bouni, Comoros =

Bouni
- Village
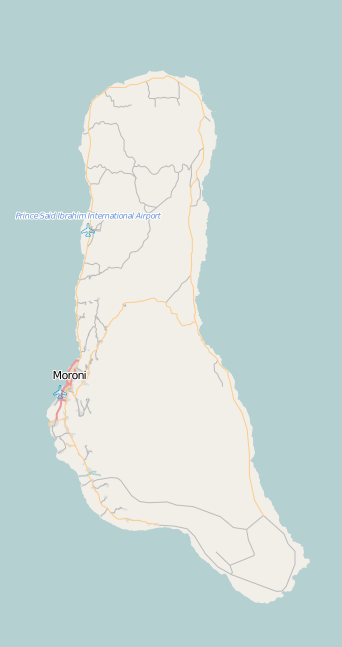
- Location in Grand Comore
- Coordinates: 11°29′19″S 43°23′53″E
- Country: Comoros
- Island: Grande Comore

Population (1991)
  - Total: 831
- Time zone: UTC+3 (EAT)

Bouni is a coastal village on the island of Grande Comore (Ngazidja) in the Comoros. According to the 1991 census, the village had a population of 831.
