= Assimpao =

- Village
- Location in Comoros
- Coordinates: 12°13′59″S 44°19′11″E
- Country: Comoros
- Island: Anjouan

Population (2009 (est.))
  - Total: 1,218
- Time zone: UTC+3 (EAT)

Assimpao is a village on the island of Anjouan in the Comoros. According to the 1991 census the town had a population of 692. The current estimate for 2009 is 1,218 people
