= Bandar Salama =

Coordinates: 12.2897°S 43.7592°E

- Village
- Interactive map of Bandar Salama
- Country: Comoros
- Island: Mohéli

Population (1991)
  - Total: 679
- Time zone: UTC+3 (EAT)

Bandar Salama is a village on the island of Mohéli (Mwali) in the Comoros. According to the 1991 census, the village had a population of 679.
