= Hachimpenda =

Coordinates: 12°12′00″S 44°15′22″E

- Village
- Interactive map of Hachimpenda
- Country: Comoros
- Island: Anjouan

Population (2009 (est.))
  - Total: 1,612
- Time zone: UTC+3 (EAT)

Hachimpenda is a village on the island of Anjouan in the Comoros. According to the 1991 census the town had a population of 926. The current estimate for 2009 is 1,612 people
