= Ntsaouéni =

Coordinates: 11°28′S 43°16′E

- Village
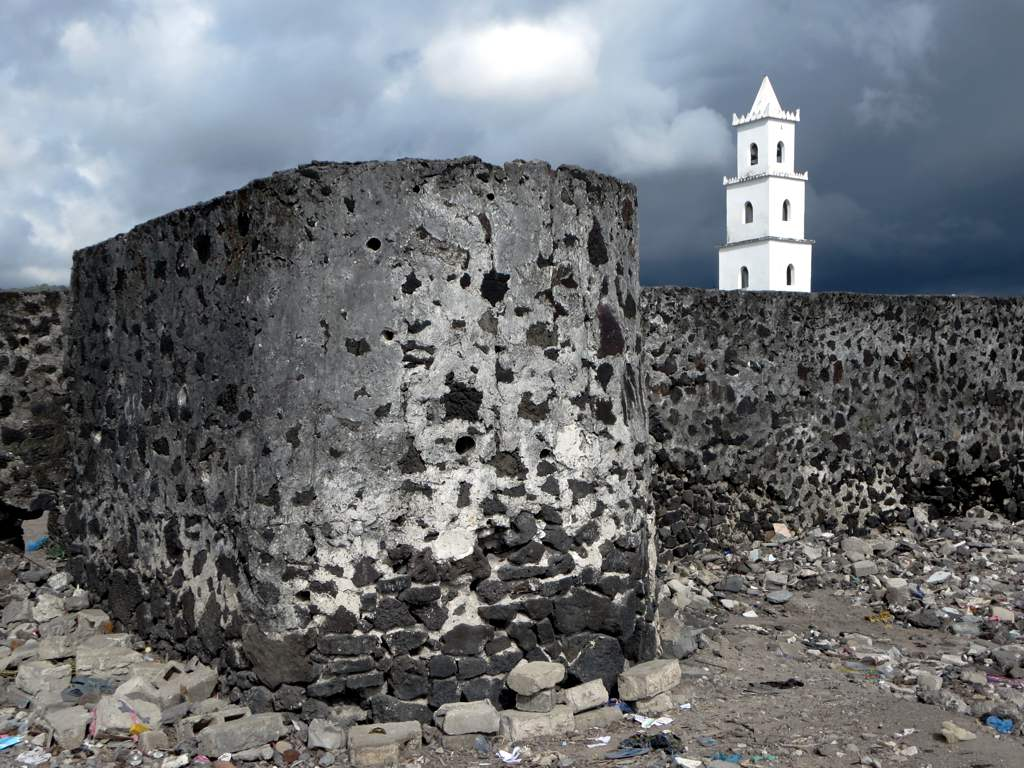
- A wall at Ntsaouéni, built to keep out Malagasy pirates

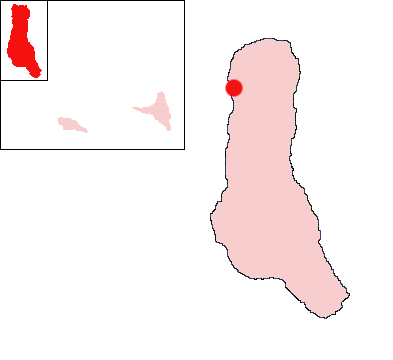
- Country: Comoros
- Island: Grande Comore

Population (1991)
  - Total: 2,620
- Time zone: UTC+3 (EAT)

Ntsaouéni is a village on the island of Grande Comore in the Comoros. According to the 1991 census the village had a population of 2620.
