= Ivoini =

Coordinates: 11°23′S 43°23′E

- Village
- Interactive map of Ivoini
- Country: Comoros
- Island: Grande Comore

Population (1991)
  - Total: 991
- Time zone: UTC+3 (EAT)

Ivoini is a village on the island of Grande Comore (Ngazidja) in the Comoros. According to the 1991 census, the village had a population of 991.
