= Limbi =

Coordinates: 12°14′S 44°30′E

- Village
- Interactive map of Limbi
- Country: Comoros
- Island: Anjouan

Population (1991)
  - Total: 645
- Time zone: UTC+3 (EAT)

Limbi is a village on the island of Anjouan in the Comoros. According to the 1991 census the village had a population of 645.
