= Maraharé =

Coordinates: 12°14′S 44°19′E

- Village
- Interactive map of Maraharé
- Country: Comoros
- Island: Anjouan

Population (1991)
  - Total: 880
- Time zone: UTC+3 (EAT)

Maraharé is a village on the island of Anjouan in the Comoros. According to the 1991 census the village had a population of 880.
