= Ngandzalé =

Coordinates: 12°16′12″S 44°30′36″E

- Town
- Interactive map of Ngandzalé
- Country: Comoros
- Island: Anjouan

Population (1991)
  - Total: 1,150
- Time zone: UTC+3 (EAT)

Ngandzalé is a small town on the island of Anjouan in the Comoros. According to the 1991 census the village had a population of 4,252.
