= Lingoni =

Coordinates: 12°15′S 44°25′E

- Village
- Interactive map of Lingoni
- Country: Comoros
- Island: Anjouan

Population (1991)
  - Total: 2,228
- Time zone: UTC+3 (EAT)

Lingoni is a village on the island of Anjouan in the Comoros. According to the 1991 census the village had a population of 2,228.
