= Chitrouni =

- Village
- Location in Comoros
- Coordinates: 12°11′25.91″S 44°20′5.45″E
- Country: Comoros
- Island: Anjouan

Population (2009 (est.))
  - Total: 1,184
- Time zone: UTC+3 (EAT)

Chitrouni is a village on the island of Anjouan in the Comoros. According to the 1991 census, the village had a population of 672. The current estimate for 2009 is 1,184 people.
