= Mohoro =

Town in Grande Comore, Comoros

Coordinates: 11°50′S 43°27′E

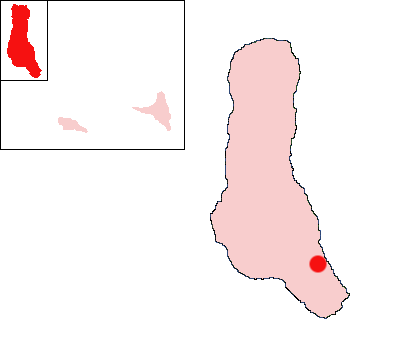
Location of Mohoro on the island of Grande Comore

Mohoro is a town located on island of Grande Comore in the Comoros.
