= Mvouni =

Human settlement in the Comoros

Coordinates: 11°43′S 43°16′E

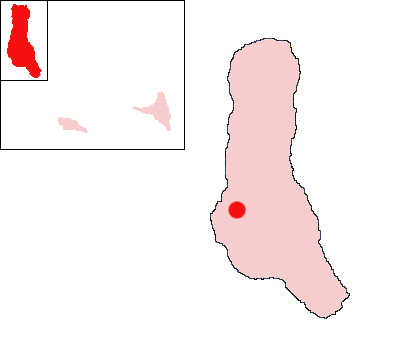
Location of Mvouni on the island of Grande Comore

Mvouni is a town located on the island of Grande Comore in the Comoros. It is located 6.9 kilometers from the country's capital, Moroni.
