= Moya, Comoros =

Human settlement in the Comoros

Coordinates: 12°18′39″S 44°26′13″E

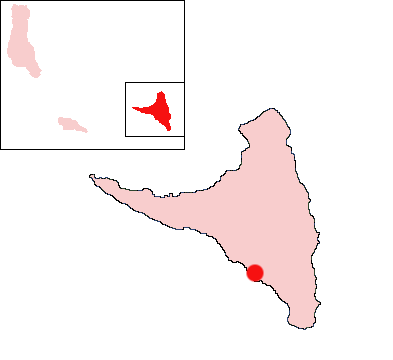
Location of Moya on the island of Anjouan

Moya is a town located on the island of Anjouan in the Comoros.
