= Mrémani =

Coordinates: 12°18′S 44°30′E

- Village
- Interactive map of Mrémani
- Country: Comoros
- Island: Anjouan

Population (1991)
  - Total: 3,501
- Time zone: UTC+3 (EAT)

Mrémani is a village on the island of Anjouan in the Comoros. According to the 1991 census the village had a population of 3,501.
