= Chezani =

- Town
- Location in Comoros
- Coordinates: 11°26′S 43°23′E
- Country: Comoros
- Island: Grande Comore
- Time zone: UTC+3 (EAT)

Chezani is a town on the island of Grande Comore in the Comoros. It is the chief town of the region of Mboinkou. On 1996, August, after a football match between Hantsindzi and Chezani, 4 persons from Hantsindzi were killed. These tragic events had led to the exclusion of Chezani population from all Ngazidja places and to the execution of Said Mohamed Fadhul (Robin), the leader of the massacre. Some years later, on April 21, 2001, 4 persons from Chezani (deputy Ibrahim Mansoib, Souefou Abdou, Dahalani Mzechehi and Mhamadi Mzechehi - these 2 youngs are brothers) were killed by an organized band from Hantsindzi as a revenge of the 96's events.
