= Mbéni =

Human settlement in the Comoros

Coordinates: 11°30′S 43°23′E

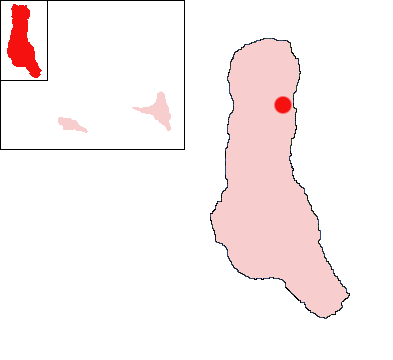
Location of Mbéni on the island of Grande Comore

Mbéni is a town located on the island of Grande Comore in the Comoros.
