= Adda-Douéni =

- Town
- Location in Comoros
- Coordinates: 12°18′S 44°30′E
- Country: Comoros
- Island: Anjouan

Population (2009 (est.))
  - Total: 10,858
- Time zone: UTC+3 (EAT)

Adda-Douéni is a small town on the island of Anjouan in the Comoros. According to the 1991 census the town had a population of 6,171. The current estimate for 2009 is 10,858 people.
