= Miringoni =

Town in the Comoros Islands

Coordinates: 12°18′S 43°38′E

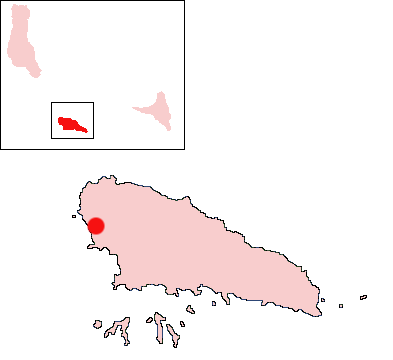
Location of Miringoni on the island of Mohéli

Miringoni is a town located on the west coast of the island of Mohéli in the Comoros Islands. Its inhabitants largely descended from plantation workers from the Island of Grand Comore.

According to some historians of the island, this town and some other three towns on the island where were formed as a gift from the sultan of Moheli that time to what the so-called "Massudjayi Mawatwani". They were the great fighters from the Island of Grand Comore who frighted against the invaders from the other Island of Anjouan who used to invade the island at harvest time and take their crops by force. The Massudjayi Mawatwani succeeded in taking the invaders out of the Island. The sultan of Mohéli decided as a reward to give some places on the island so that they could form their villages and live with their families. These villages are Miringoni, Boingoma, and Itsamia.
