= Maweni =

Administrative ward in Singida Region, Tanzania

Maweni Kata ya Maweni
- Ward
- Location within Tanzania
- Coordinates: 5.8819666°S 35.12406376°E
- Country: Tanzania
- Region: Singida Region
- District: Manyoni District
- Ward: Maweni

Population (2016)
  - Total: 8,639
- Time zone: UTC+3 (EAT)

Maweni is an administrative ward in the Manyoni District of the Singida Region of Tanzania. In 2016 the Tanzania National Bureau of Statistics report there were 8,639 people in the ward.
