= Harembo =

Coordinates: 12°09′S 44°30′E

- Village
- Interactive map of Harembo
- Country: Comoros
- Island: Anjouan

Population (2009 (est.))
  - Total: 1,859
- Time zone: UTC+3 (EAT)

Harembo is a village on the island of Anjouan in the Comoros. According to the 1991 census, the town had a population of 1,056. The current estimate for 2009 is 1,859 people.
