= Dziani =

- Village
- Location in Comoros
- Coordinates: 12°11′S 44°29′E
- Country: Comoros
- Island: Anjouan

Population (2009 (est.))
  - Total: 1,920
- Time zone: UTC+3 (EAT)

Dziani is a village on the island of Anjouan in the Comoros. According to the 1991 census the town had a population of 1,091. The current estimate for 2009 is 1,920 people
