= Dar-Salama =

Village on Anjouan Island, Comoros

- Village
- Interactive map of Dar-Salama
- Coordinates: 12°15′03″S 44°23′17″E
- Country: Comoros
- Island: Anjouan

Population (2009 (est.))
  - Total: 1,059
- Time zone: UTC+3 (EAT)

Dar-Salama is a village on the island of Anjouan in the Comoros. According to the 1991 census the town had a population of 601. The current estimate for 2009 is 1,059 people.
