= Pomoni-Nindri =

Village on Anjouan Island, Comoros

Coordinates: 12°16′48″S 44°24′32″E

- Village
- Interactive map of Pomoni-Nindri
- Country: Comoros
- Island: Anjouan

Population (1991)
  - Total: 1,825
- Time zone: UTC+3 (EAT)

Pomoni-Nindri is a village on the island of Anjouan in the Comoros. According to the 1991 census the village had a population of 1825.
