= Ntsadjéni =

Coordinates: 11°24′S 43°17′E

- Village
- Interactive map of Ntsadjéni
- Country: Comoros
- Island: Grande Comore

Population (1991)
  - Total: 964
- Time zone: UTC+3 (EAT)

Ntsadjéni is a village on the island of Grande Comore in the Comoros.
