= Akibani =

- Village
- Location in Comoros
- Coordinates: 12°11′35″S 44°21′43″E
- Country: Comoros
- Island: Anjouan

Population (2009 (est.))
  - Total: 2,110
- Time zone: UTC+3 (EAT)

Akibani is a village on the island of Anjouan in the Comoros. According to the 1991 census, the town had a population of 1,199. The current estimate for 2009 is 2,110 people.

== History ==
The origins of Akibani date back to a time long before the colonial era. According to oral traditions, its history began with the foundation of the village by two distinct groups.

=== The First Group ===
The first group, whose origins remain mysterious, initially lived in an area not far from the current location of Akibani. This site, situated on a plateau south of the village, is known as Bandrajou-dzitsoni. Ancient dwelling ruins, still visible today, attest to their presence. Nearby is a place called Mavani, a Comorian term referring to cemeteries. This somber site, believed to be an ancient burial ground, likely served as a resting place for these early inhabitants.

This first group, well-organized and settled, contributed to the founding of Akibani. However, the reasons for their migration from Bandrajou-dzitsoni to present-day Akibani remain unknown. Was it a natural disaster, an external threat, or divine intervention? The true cause remains uncertain.

=== The Second Group ===
The second group is more identifiable, as their story is tied to the movements of populations from the villages of Bandrani ya Chitrouni, Bandrani ya Saandani, Bandrani Mtsangani, Bandrani ya Maouéni, Bandrani ya Chironkamba, and Akibani. These six villages share a common history.

According to stories, this group descended from individuals once imprisoned in Mutsamudu, the capital of Anjouan. After escaping, they sought refuge in the mountains to evade pursuing soldiers. Their journey first led them to the present-day villages of Chitrouni and Saandani, strategically located on hills for better concealment. Yet, their persistent fears drove them to continue searching for a safer place.

Heading east, they reached an area near the sea, today known as Bandrani Mtsangani. However, wary of the proximity to water and its potential dangers, some decided to move further inland. At this point, the group split in two: one part headed towards Maouéni, while the other followed the Akibani River upstream.

This latter group eventually divided again. Some settled in Mro-wa-nsini and others in Mro-wa-uju, two peaceful sites close to water sources. Over the years, these sub-groups migrated again. Those from Mro-wa-nsini founded the present-day village of Chironkamba, while those from Mro-wa-uju moved to the plains, establishing what is now Akibani.

The latter group is often associated with the Mirereni family, considered the first inhabitants of Akibani. However, this claim remains uncertain, as the traces of Bandrajou-dzitsoni inhabitants suggest an earlier presence in the region.

=== The Name Change ===
Historically, Akibani was originally called Nsengueni. According to Anjouanese oral tradition, the name change is linked to a fascinating legend.

The story recounts that a group of people was desperately searching for a rare variety of paddy. After scouring the island without success, they arrived at Nsengueni and miraculously found what they were looking for. Soon after, another quest began, this time for a seven-year-old rooster. The seekers, equally unsuccessful elsewhere, were directed to Nsengueni. Once there, they discovered the much-coveted rooster.

These extraordinary discoveries led the men to exclaim, "Ankibani!" (meaning "a place of reserve" in Comorian). This site, now known for its hidden treasures, was renamed Ankibani, which eventually evolved into Akibani.

Thus, Akibani was born from the union of these two groups and rooted in tales of quest, escape, and survival. It embodies the story of a place shaped by generations in search of safety and abundance.
