= Vassi =

Coordinates: 12°14′S 44°21′E

- Village
- Interactive map of Vassi
- Country: Comoros
- Island: Anjouan

Population (1991)
  - Total: 587
- Time zone: UTC+3 (EAT)

Vassi is a village on the island of Anjouan in the Comoros. According to the 1991 census the village had a population of 587.
