= Mtakoudja =

Town in Mohéli, Comoros

Coordinates: 12°16′S 43°42′E

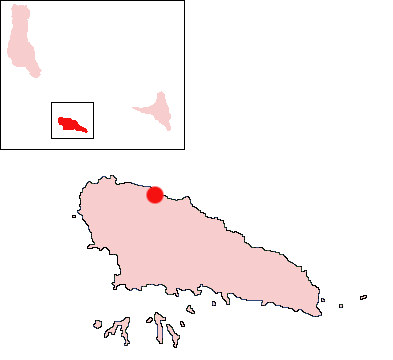
Location of Mtakoudja on the island of Mohéli

Mtakoudja is a town located on the island of Mohéli in the Comoros.
