= Koni Ngani =

Coordinates: 12°13′S 44°29′E

- Village
- Interactive map of Koni Ngani
- Country: Comoros
- Island: Anjouan

Population (2012 (est.))
  - Total: 3,913
- Time zone: UTC+3 (EAT)

Koni Ngani is a village on the island of Anjouan in the Comoros. According to the 1991 census the village had a population of 2,045. The calculation for 2012 is 3,913 people.
