= Ongodjou =

- Town
- Interactive map of Ongodjou
- Coordinates: 12.312°S 44.509°E
- Country: Comoros
- Island: Anjouan

Population (1991)
  - Total: 6,487
- Time zone: UTC+3 (EAT)

Ongodjou is a town on the island of Anjouan in the Comoros. According to the 1991 census the village had a population of 6487.
