= Barakani, Mwali =

Barakani
- Village
- Location in Comoros
- Country: Comoros
- Island: Moheli

Population (1991)
  - Total: 694
- Time zone: UTC+3 (EAT)

Barakani is a village on the island of Moheli in the Comoros. According to the 1991 census the village had a population of 694.
