= Koimbani =

Human settlement in the Comoros

Coordinates: 11°37′S 43°21′E

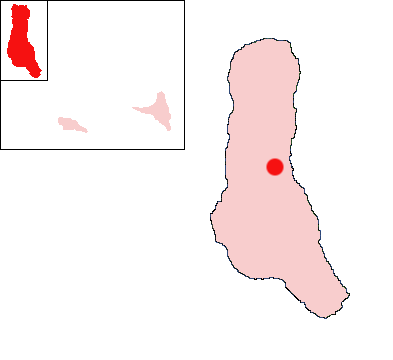
Location of Koimbani on the island of Grande Comore

Koimbani is a town located on the island of Grande Comore in the Comoros, believed to have been built by the Portuguese.
