= Milémbéni =

- Village
- Interactive map of Milémbéni
- Country: Comoros
- Island: Anjouan

Population (1991)
  - Total: 550
- Time zone: UTC+3 (EAT)

Milémbéni is a village on the island of Anjouan in the Comoros. According to the 1991 census the village had a population of 550.
