= Ndrondroni =

Town in the Comoros

Coordinates: 12°21′S 43°41′E

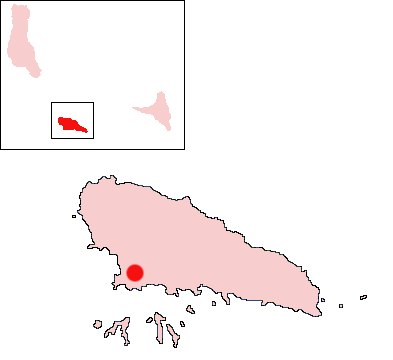
Location of Ndrondroni on the island of Mohéli

Ndrondroni is a town located on the island of Mohéli in the Comoros. The town received international attention in December 2012, when cases of the rare chelonitoxism foodborne illness left three residents dead and 30 ill.
