= Bada Kouni =

- Village
- Location in Comoros
- Coordinates: 12.3131°S 44.4956°E
- Country: Comoros
- Island: Anjouan

Population (2009 (est.))
  - Total: 3,218
- Time zone: UTC+3 (EAT)

Badracouni is a village on the island of Anjouan in the Comoros. According to the 1991 census the town had a population of 1,828 residents. The current estimate for 2009 is 3,218 residents.
