= Hamchako =

Coordinates: 12°22′15″S 44°30′46″E

- Village
- Interactive map of Hamchako
- Country: Comoros
- Island: Anjouan

Population (2009 (est.))
  - Total: 1,979
- Time zone: UTC+3 (EAT)

Hamchako is a village on the island of Anjouan in the Comoros. According to the 1991 census the town had a population of 1,124. The current estimate for 2009 is 1,979 people
