= Kangani, Anjouan =

Kangani
- Village
- Location in Comoros
- Coordinates: 12.3100°S 44.4700°E
- Country: Comoros
- Island: Anjouan

Population (2009 (est.))
  - Total: 4,062
- Time zone: UTC+3 (EAT)

Kangani is a village on the island of Anjouan in the Comoros. According to the 1991 census the town had a population of 2,308. The current calculation for 2012 is 4,416 people
