= Pidjani =

Human settlement in the Comoros

Coordinates: 11°47′14″S 43°27′13″E

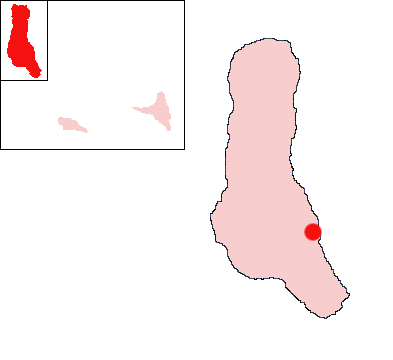
Location of Pidjani on the island of Grande Comore

Pidjani is a town located on the island of Grande Comore in the Comoros.
