= Mramani =

Human settlement in Anjouan, Comoros

Coordinates: 12°21′S 44°32′E

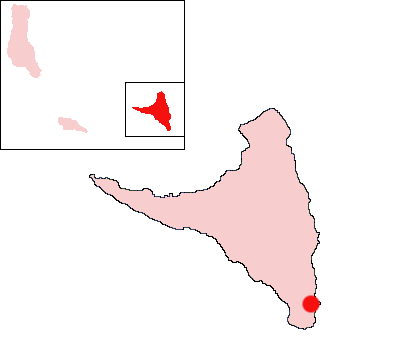
Location of Mramani on the island of Anjouan

Mramani (or M'Ramani) is a town located on the island of Anjouan in the Comoros.

The economy of the city of Mramani is mainly related to local businesses and agricultural crops and local products such as fishing.
