= Koni-Djodjo =

Comorian town

Coordinates: 12°14′S 44°29′E

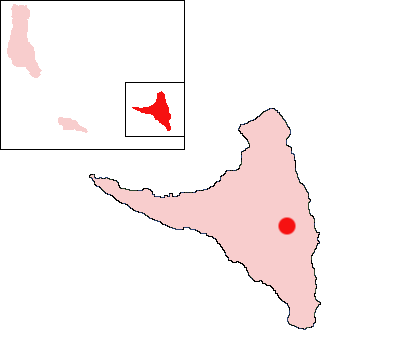
Location of Koni-Djodjo on the island of Anjouan

Koni-Djodjo is a town located on the island of Anjouan in the Comoros. The population of Koni-Djodjo is 7,232 inhabitants according to the latest (2002) census.
