= Nioumachoua =

Coordinates: 12°22′S 43°43′E

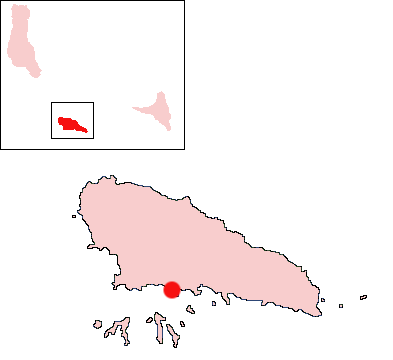
Nyumashiwa Location of Nyumashiwa on the island of Mohéli

- Location of Nyumashiwa on the island of Moheli
- Country: Comoros
- Island: Moheli
- Time zone: UTC+3 (Eastern Africa Time)
- Area code: 269

Nyumashiwa (population 3,400) is the second largest city on the Comorian island of Mohéli, after Fomboni, the capital. It is located in the southern part of the island; it is known because of the islets which are in front of the city and which are called the islets of Nyumashiwa. There are eight of them. Some of them have the most beautiful white sand beaches on the island.

There are numerous activities that a tourist can do at Nioumachoua Beach which include “diving [near] the coral reefs, fishing, sea boat tours, and tropical forest tours”. There have even been sightings of whales in the area by local tours.

== The islets of Nyumashiwa ==
The islets of Nyumashiwa that are located off the southern coast of Mohéli are the largest and best known. Their names all begin with shisiwa which means island . They all have the same massive appearance.
