= Tsimbeo =

Town on the island of Anjouan, Comoros

Coordinates: 12°12′S 44°28′E

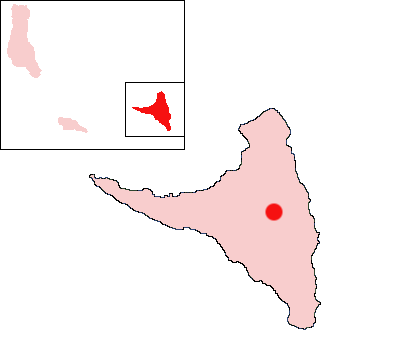
Location of Tsimbeo on the island of Anjouan

Tsembeho (or Tsémbehou) is a town located on the island of Anjouan in the Comoros. it is the third largest city of Anjouan.
