= Wanani =

Human settlement in the Comoros

Coordinates: 12°20′S 43°48′E

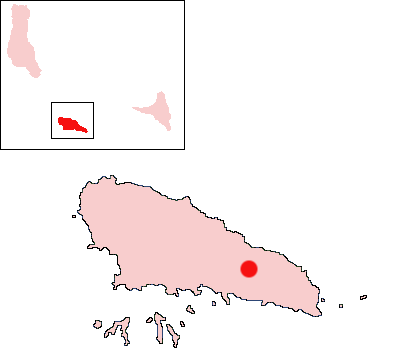
Location of Wanani on the island of Mohéli

Wanani (or Ouanani) is a town located on the island of Mohéli in the Comoros. In 2010, it had approximately 2,500 residents. It is located approximately 20 km from Fomboni and is known as "a banana, cassava and potato farming area".

It is the capital of the Djando region
