= Bambao Mtrouni =

Bambao
- Village
- Location in Comoros
- Coordinates: 12°12′S 44°31′E
- Country: Comoros
- Island: Anjouan

Population (2009 (est.))
  - Total: 2,699
- Time zone: UTC+3 (EAT)

Bambao is a village on the island of Anjouan in the Comoros.
