= Dindri =

- Village
- Location in Comoros
- Coordinates: 12°12′50″S 44°27′09″E
- Country: Comoros
- Island: Anjouan

Population (1991)
  - Total: 4,441
- Time zone: UTC+3 (EAT)

Dindri is a village on the island of Anjouan in the Comoros. According to the 1991 Comoros census it had a population of 4,441. The estimated population for 2009 is 7,816.
