= Bimbini =

- Village
- Location in Comoros
- Coordinates: 12°11′31.65″S 44°14′2.85″E
- Country: Comoros
- Island: Anjouan

Population (2009 (est.))
  - Total: 2,247
- Time zone: UTC+3 (EAT)

Bimbini is a village on the island of Anjouan in the Comoros. According to the 1991 census, the village had a population of 1,276. The estimate for 2009 was 2,247 people.
