= Mbatsé =

Town in Comoros

Coordinates: 12°16′3″S 43°42′17″E

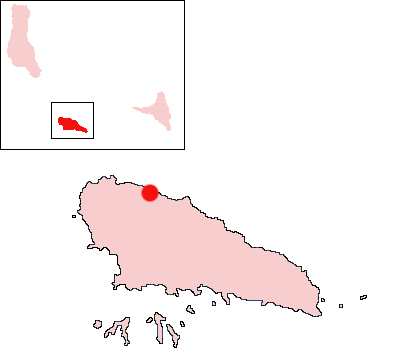
Location of Mbatsé on the island of Mohéli

Mbatsé is a town located on the island of Mohéli in the Comoros.
