= Hoani =

Human settlement in the Comoros

Coordinates: 12°15′S 43°40′E

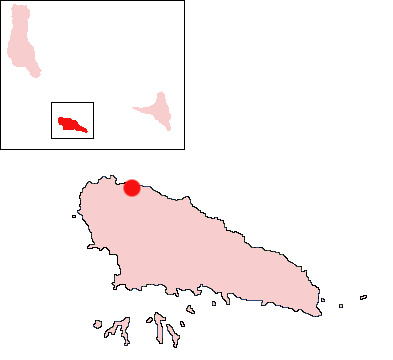
Location of Hoani on the island of Mohéli

Hoani is a town located on the island of Mohéli in the Comoros.

Hoani is an internationally significant nesting site for the Green turtle.
