= Komoni, Comoros =

Village Anjouan Island, Comoros

Coordinates: 12°19′32″S 44°31′14″E

Komoni
- Village
- Interactive map of Komoni
- Country: Comoros
- Island: Anjouan

Population (2012 (est.))
  - Total: 4,376
- Time zone: UTC+3 (EAT)

Komoni is a village on the island of Anjouan in the Comoros. According to the 1991 census the village had a population of 2,287. The calculation for 2012 is 4,376 people
