= Grande Comore =

Coordinates: 11°35′S 43°20′E

Grande Comore Île Autonome de la Grande Comore Ngazidja جزيرة القمر الكبرى ذات الحكم الذاتي
- Autonomous island
- Grande Comore
- Flag

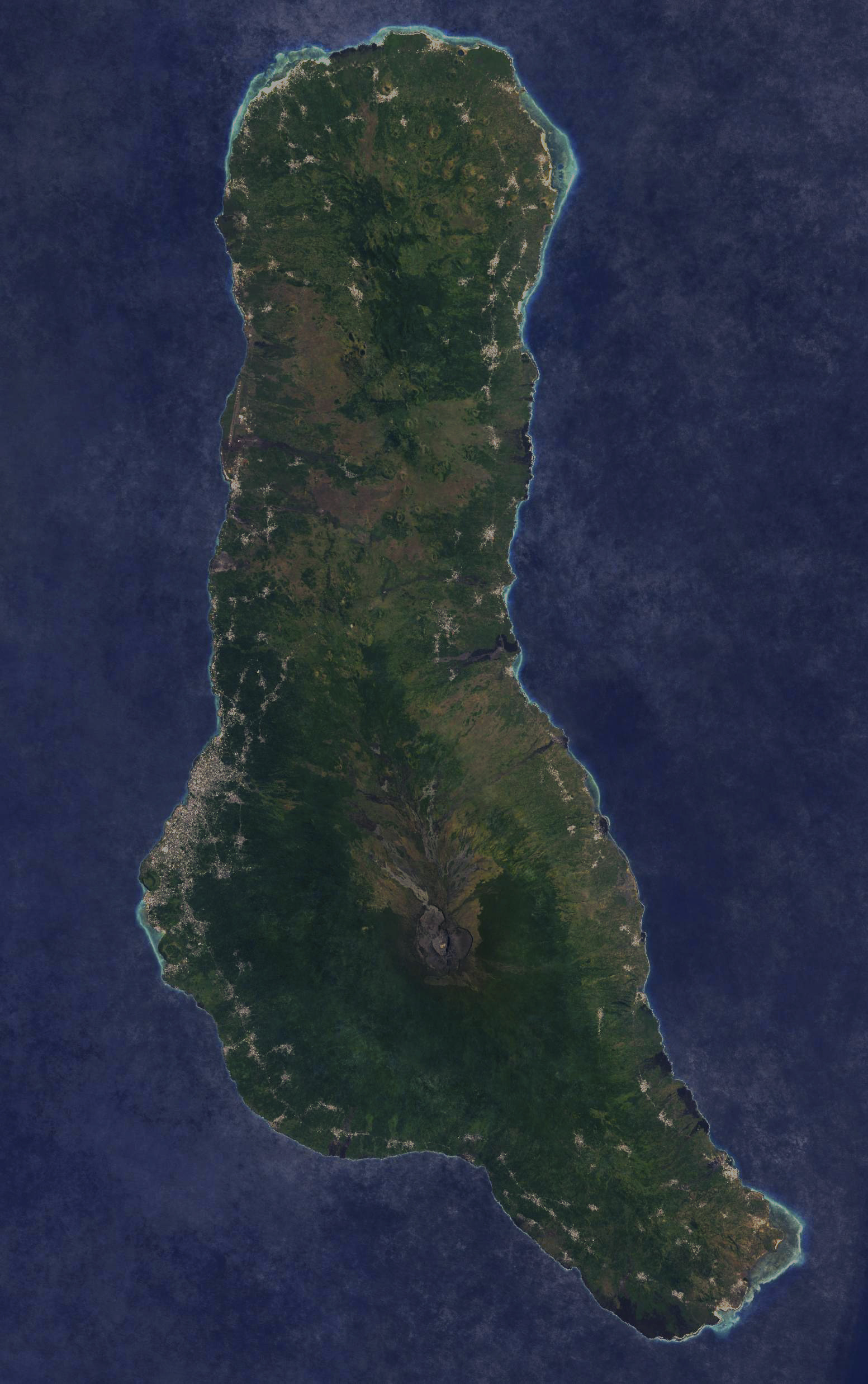
- Satellite imagery of Ngazidja, 2022.

- Ngazidja in Comoros
- Country: Comoros
- Capital: Moroni

Government
  - Governor: Ibrahim Mze Mohamed

Area
  - Total: 1,025 km^{2} (396 sq mi)

Population (2003)
  - Total: 295,700
  - Estimate (2024): 450.000
  - Density: 288.5/km^{2} (747.2/sq mi)
- Time zone: UTC+03:00 (EAT)

Ngazidja, known as Grande Comore (French pronunciation: [ɡʁɑ̃d kɔmɔʁ];) in French, and formerly known in English as Comoro, is an island in Comoros off the coast of Africa. It is the largest island in the Comoros nation. Most of its population is of the Comorian ethnic group. Its population as of 2006 is about 316,600. The island's capital is Moroni, which is also the national capital. The island is made up of two shield volcanoes, with Mount Karthala being the country's highest point at 2,361 m (7,746 ft) above sea level. In line with the 2009 revision of the constitution of 2002, it is governed by an elected governor, as are the other islands, with the federal government being much reduced in power.

== History ==
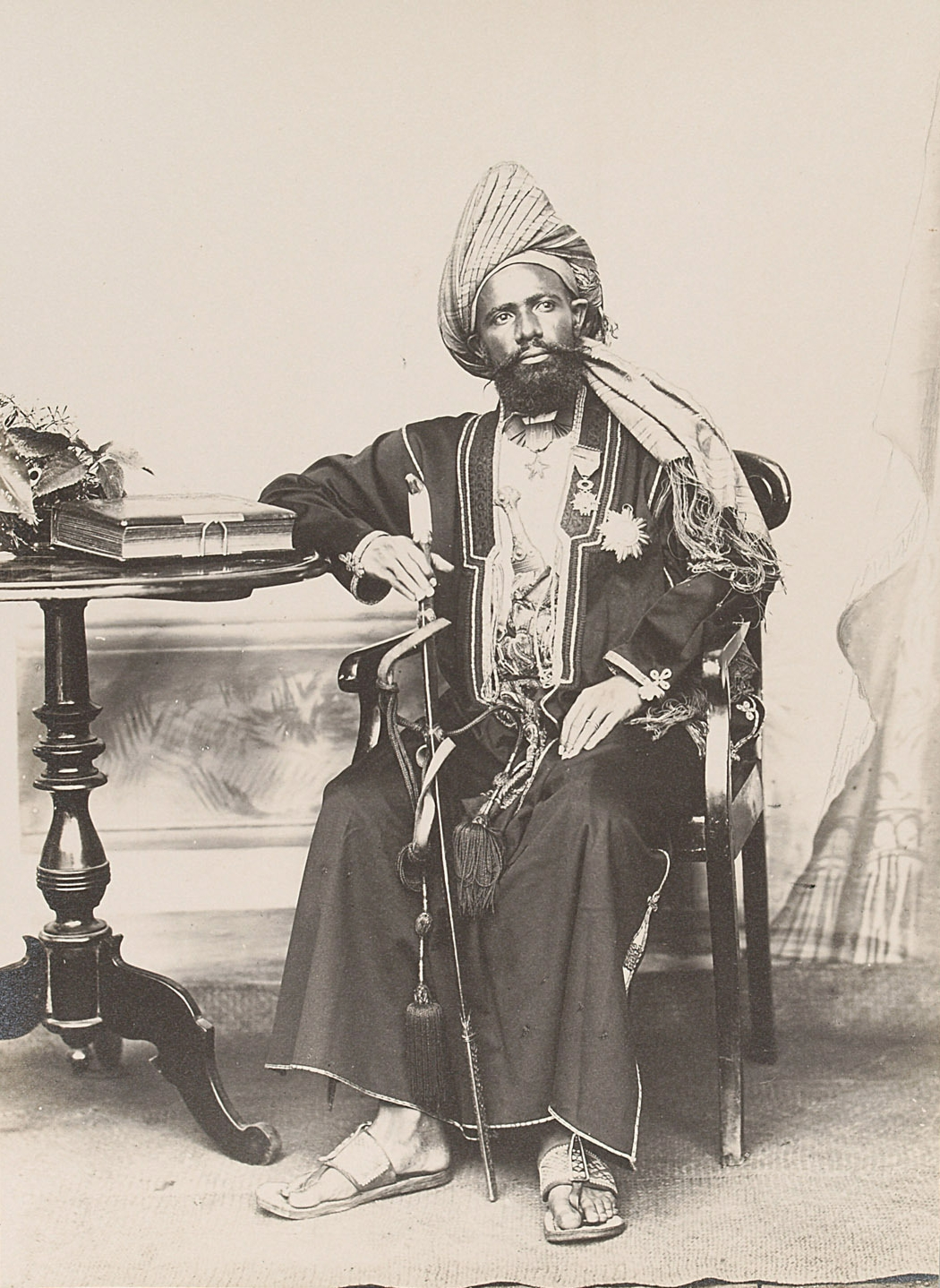
Sultan Said Ali bin Said Omar of Ngazidja (1897).

For several centuries, Ngazidja was divided into a number of sultanates, including Bambao, Itsandra, Mitsamihuli, Mbadjini, Hambuu, Washili, Hamahame, Mbwankuu, Mbude and Domba. The sultans were also known as mfaume. In 1886, the ruler of Anjouan, Sultan Said Ali bin Said Omar declared a "state of Ngazidja", usurping the other sultanates and accepting a French protectorate over the island. In 1893, Sultan Said Ali was sent into exile on Réunion. In 1910 he abdicated and in 1912 France annexed the island and the sultanate was abolished. In 1975, Ngazidja, Anjouan and Mohéli declared independence as the nation of Comoros.

On 23 November 1996, Ethiopian Airlines Flight 961 was hijacked while in Ethiopian airspace en route from Addis Ababa to Nairobi. The Boeing 767-260ER crash-landed in the Indian Ocean off the north coast of Ngazidja after running out of fuel, killing 125 out of the 175 people on board, including 3 of the hijackers.

In 1997, the Comoros nation began to fall apart as Anjouan and Moheli seceded. Ngazidja became the only island under federal control. By 2002, however, Ngazidja was reunited with the other islands under the new constitution. Abdou Soule Elbak was elected President of Ngazidja in May 2002. He received only 17% of the vote in the first round, coming in first place, and received 60% of the vote in the runoff. He remained in his post until the July 2007 elections, at which point Mohamed Abdoulwahab won the island's presidency. The position of the President of Ngazidja was later transferred into the position of Governor of Ngazidja.

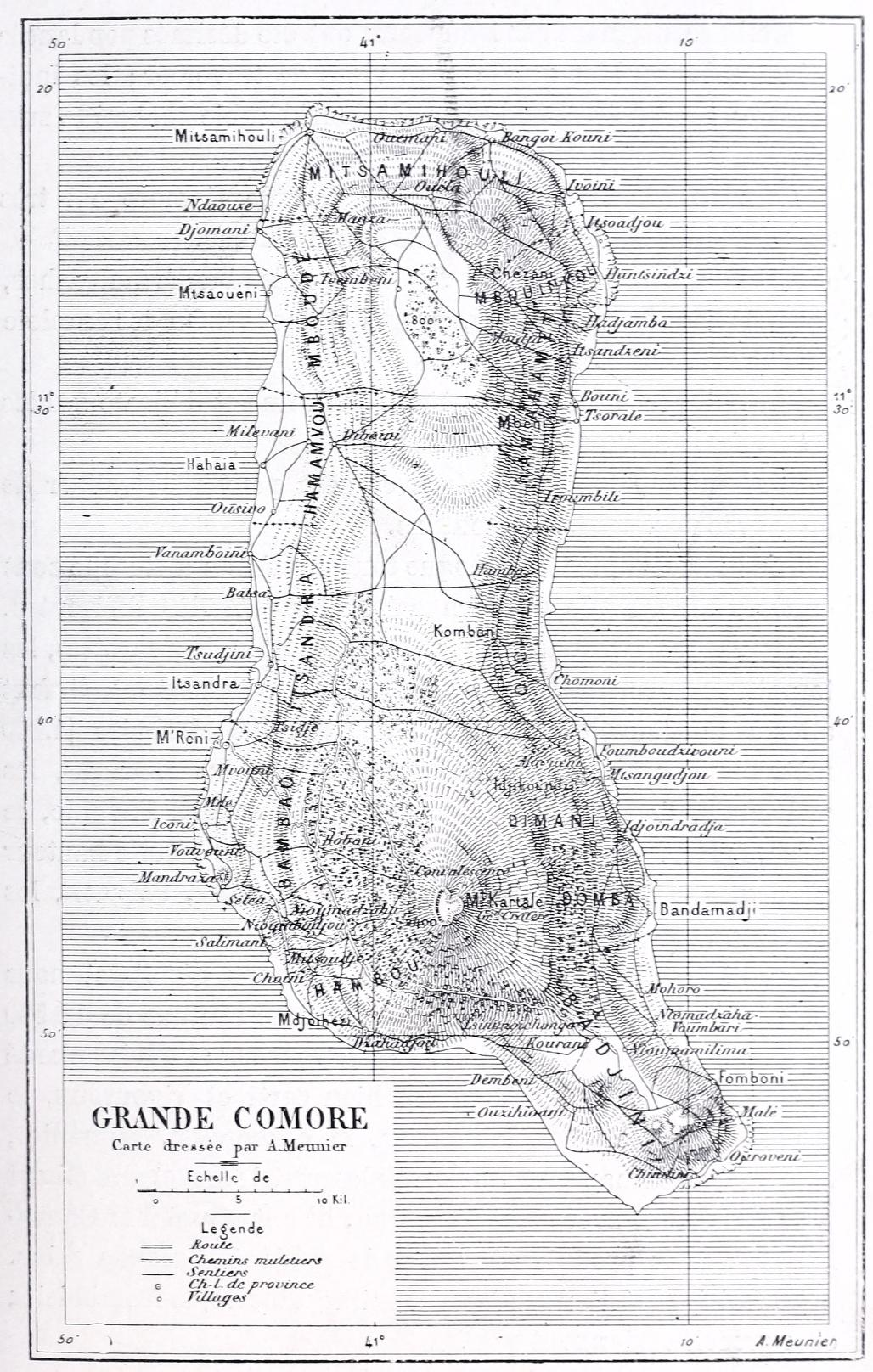
Ngazidja is the largest island of the Comoros islands.

== Transport ==
Prince Said Ibrahim International Airport serves the island.

== See also ==
- Assembly of the Autonomous Island of Grande Comore
