= Demographics of the Comoros =

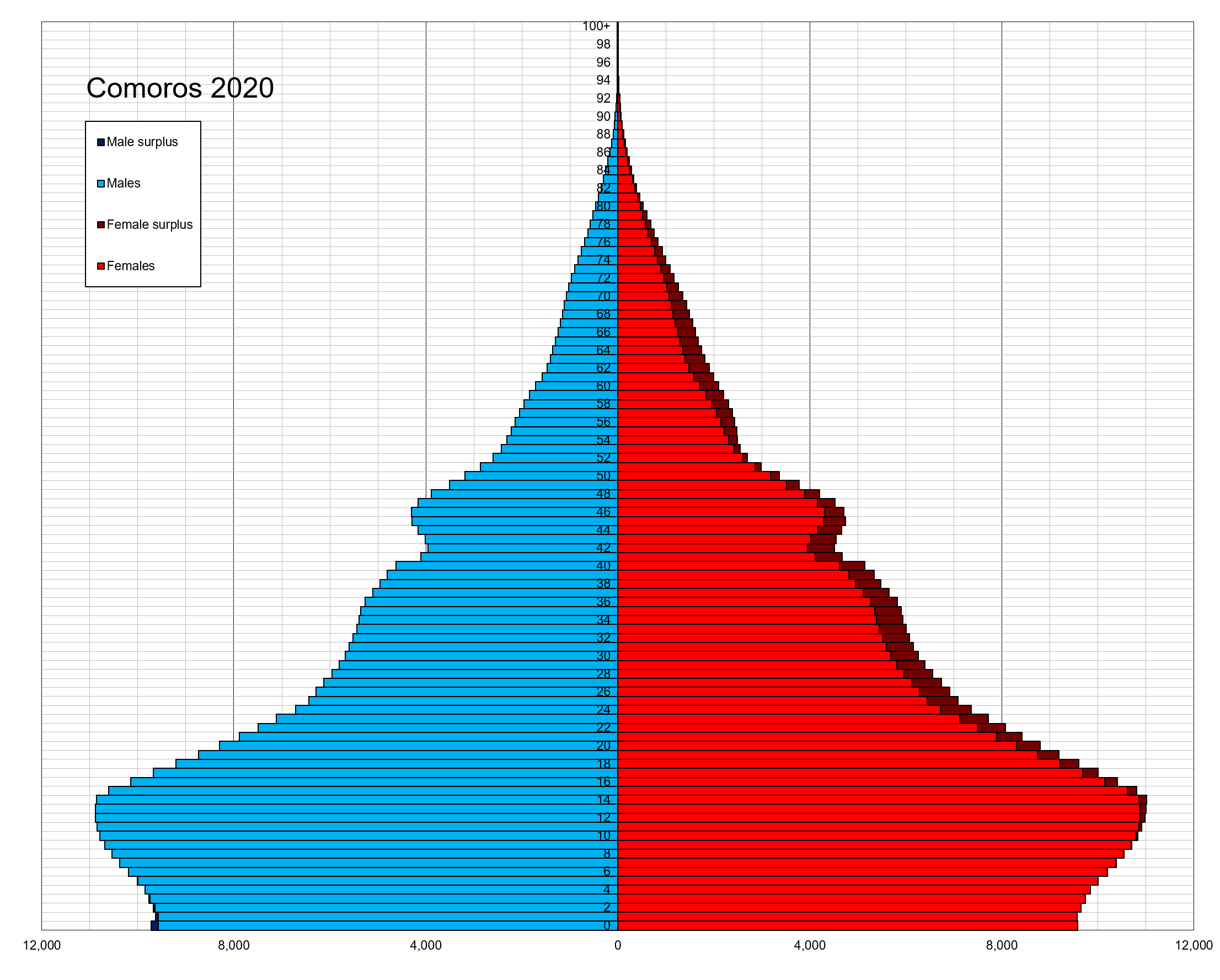
- Population pyramid of the Comoros in 2020
- Population: 876,437 (2022 est.)
- Growth rate: 1.37% (2022 est.)
- Birth rate: 22.52 births/1,000 population (2022 est.)
- Death rate: 6.55 deaths/1,000 population (2022 est.)
- Life expectancy: 67.2 years
  - male: 64.93 years
  - female: 69.54 years
- Fertility rate: 2.78 children born/woman (2022 est.)
- Infant mortality: 57.1 deaths/1,000 live births
- Net migration rate: -2.25 migrant(s)/1,000 population (2022 est.)

Age structure
- 0–14 years: 36.68%
- 65 and over: 4.08%

Sex ratio
- Total: 0.94 male(s)/female (2022 est.)
- At birth: 1.03 male(s)/female
- Under 15: 1 male(s)/female
- 65 and over: 0.76 male(s)/female

Nationality
- Nationality: Comorian

Language
- Official: Arabic, French, Shikomoro

Population, fertility rate and net reproduction rate, United Nations estimates

The Comorians (Arabic: القمري) inhabiting Grande Comore, Anjouan, and Mohéli (86% of the population) share African-Arab origins. Islam is the dominant religion, and Quranic schools for children reinforce its influence. Although Islamic culture is firmly established throughout, a small minority are Christian.

The most common language is Comorian, related to Swahili. French and Arabic also are spoken. About 89% of the population is literate.

The Comoros have had eight censuses since World War II:

- 1951
- 1956
- 7 September 1958: 183,133
- 6 July 1966
- 15 September 1980: 335,150
- 15 September 1991: 446,817
- 15 September 2003: 575,660
- 15 December 2017: 758,316

The official estimate as of 1 July 2020 is 897,219.

Population density figures conceal a great disparity between the republic's most crowded island, Anjouan, which had a density of 772 persons per square kilometer in 2017; Grande Comore, which had a density of 331 persons per square kilometer in 2017; and Mohéli, where the 2017 population density figure was 178 persons per square kilometer. By comparison, estimates of the population density per square kilometer of the Indian Ocean's other island microstates ranged from 241 (Seychelles) to 690 (Maldives) in 1993. Given the rugged terrain of Grande Comore and Anjouan, and the dedication of extensive tracts to agriculture on all three islands, population pressures on the Comoros are becoming increasingly critical.

The age structure of the population of the Comoros is similar to that of many developing countries, in that the republic has a very large proportion of young people. In 1989, 46.4 percent of the population was under fifteen years of age, an above-average proportion even for sub-Saharan Africa. The population's rate of growth was a relatively high 3.5 percent per annum in the mid-1980s, up substantially from 2.0 percent in the mid-1970s and 2.1 percent in the mid-1960s.

In 1983 the Abdallah regime borrowed US$2.85 million from the International Development Association to devise a national family planning program. However, Islamic reservations about contraception made forthright advocacy and implementation of birth control programs politically hazardous, and consequently little was done in the way of public policy.

The Comorian population has become increasingly urbanized in recent years. In 1991 the percentage of Comorians residing in cities and towns of more than 5,000 persons was about 30 percent, up from 25 percent in 1985 and 23 percent in 1980. The Comoros' largest cities were the capital, Moroni, with about 30,000 people, and the port city of Mutsamudu, on the island of Anjouan, with about 20,000 people.

Migration among the various islands is important. Natives of Anjouan have settled in significant numbers on less crowded Mohéli, causing social tensions, and many Anjouan also migrate to Mayotte, a French territory. In 1977 Mayotte, then called Maori, expelled peasants from Grande Comore and Anjouan who had recently settled in large numbers on the island. Some were allowed to reenter starting in 1981 but solely as migrant labor.

The number of Comorians living abroad has been estimated at between 80,000 and 100,000; during the colonial period, most of them lived in Tanzania, Madagascar, and other parts of Southeast Africa. The number of Comorians residing in Madagascar was drastically reduced after anti-Comorian rioting in December 1976 in Mahajanga, in which at least 1,400 Comorians were killed. As many as 17,000 Comorians left Madagascar to seek refuge in their native land in 1977 alone. About 100,000 Comorians live in France; many of them had gone there for a university education and never returned. Small numbers of Indians, Malagasy, South Africans, and Europeans (mostly French) live on the islands and play an important role in the economy. Most French left after independence in 1975.

Some Persian Gulf countries started buying Comorian citizenship for their stateless Bedoon residents and deporting them to Comoros.

== Population ==
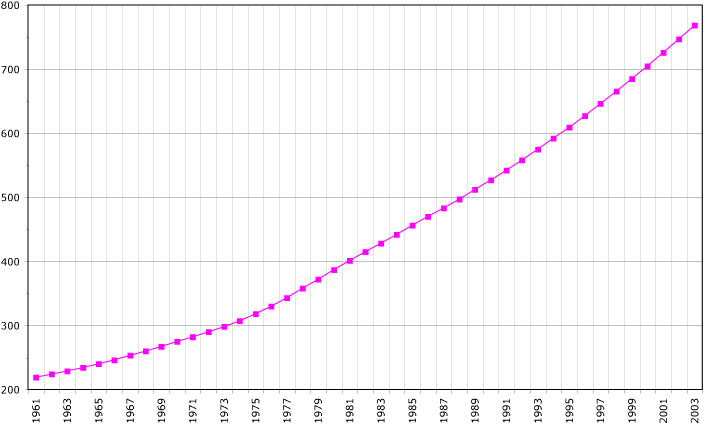
Demographics of the Comoros, Data of FAO, year 2005; Number of inhabitants in thousands.

=== UN population projections ===
UN medium variant projections
Year	Population
2010	734,750
2015	832,400
2020	933,330
2025	1,041,150
2030	1,160,260
2035	1,290,200
2040	1,425,970
2045	1,562,910
2050	1,700,130

== Vital statistics ==
Statistics as of 2010:

Period	Live births per year	Deaths per year	Natural change per year	CBR*	CDR*	NC*	TFR*	IMR*
1950–1955	8 000	4 000	4 000	46.8	24.0	22.8	6.00	178
1955–1960	9 000	4 000	5 000	48.9	22.9	26.0	6.60	167
1960–1965	10 000	4 000	6 000	48.0	20.8	27.2	6.91	154
1965–1970	11 000	4 000	6 000	46.8	18.9	27.9	7.05	141
1970–1975	12 000	4 000	8 000	46.8	16.9	29.8	7.05	127
1975–1980	14 000	5 000	10 000	47.9	15.6	32.3	7.05	116
1980–1985	17 000	5 000	12 000	48.6	14.3	34.4	7.05	106
1985–1990	16 000	5 000	11 000	39.6	12.1	27.5	6.00	95
1990–1995	17 000	5 000	12 000	36.6	11.0	25.6	5.30	89
1995–2000	20 000	6 000	15 000	38.6	10.6	28.0	5.30	83
2000–2005	24 000	6 000	18 000	40.2	10.1	30.0	5.30	78
2005–2010	27 000	7 000	20 000	39.0	9.4	29.5	5.08	72
* CBR = crude birth rate (per 1000); CDR = crude death rate (per 1000); NC = natural change (per 1000); IMR = infant mortality rate per 1000 births; TFR = total fertility rate (number of children per woman)

=== Demographic and Health Surveys ===
Total Fertility Rate (TFR) (Wanted Fertility Rate) and Crude Birth Rate (CBR):

Year	Total		Urban		Rural	
Year	CBR	TFR	CBR	TFR	CBR	TFR
1996	33.9	5.1 (3.7)	28.9	4.1 (3.1)	35.8	5.5 (4.0)
2012	32.3	4.3 (3.2)	27.7	3.5 (2.5)	34.5	4.8 (3.5)

Structure of the population (DHS 2012) (Males 11 088, Females 12 284 = 23 373) :

Age group	Male (%)	Female (%)	Total (%)
0–4	15.5	13.6	14.5
5–9	15.0	13.8	14.4
10–14	13.9	11.8	12.8
15–19	10.1	11.2	10.7
20–24	6.8	8.6	7.8
25–29	5.4	7.8	6.7
30–34	5.8	6.5	6.2
35–39	6.0	5.4	5.7
40–44	4.5	4.0	4.2
45–49	3.2	2.5	2.9
50–54	2.9	4.9	3.9
55–59	1.7	2.2	2.0
60–64	3.3	2.6	2.9
65–69	1.5	1.3	1.4
70–74	2.3	1.7	2.0
75–79	0.8	0.8	0.8
80+	1.2	1.3	1.3
Unknown	0.1	0.1	0.1

Age group	Male (%)	Female (%)	Total (%)
0–14	44.4	39.2	41.7
15–64	49.7	55.6	52.7
65+	5.8	5.1	5.5

Fertility data as of 2012 (DHS Program):

Region	Total fertility rate	Percentage of women age 15-49 currently pregnant	Mean number of children ever born to women age 40–49
Mohéli	5.0	6.8	6.3
Anjouan	5.2	6.7	5.8
Grande Comore	3.5	6.5	4.6

== Languages ==
Arabic (official), French (official), Comorian (official)

== Religion ==
Comorians are predominantly Muslims. Islam is the official religion of the Comoros.

== See also ==
- Demographics of Mayotte
- Islam in the Comoros
