= List of football clubs in the Comoros =

For a complete list see Category:Football clubs in the Comoros

== A ==
- AJSM de Mutsamudu (Mutsamudu)
- Apache (Mitsamiouli)
- ASIM Itsandra (Ngazidja)
- Atomic Ngomé

== C ==
- Chirazienne FC
- Coin Nord (Mitsamiouli)

== D ==
- Djabal Club

== E ==
- Élan Club (Mitsoudjé)
- ESM de M'Djoiezi
- Étoile des Comores (Nyoumadzaha Bambao)
- Etoile d'Or
- Étoile du Sud
- Étoile Polaire (Nioumamilima)

== F ==
- Fomboni FC (Fomboni)

== G ==
- Gombessa Sport

== H ==
- Hairu FC (Ngazidja)

== J ==
- JACM de Mitsoudjé

== K ==
- Komorozine de Domoni

== N ==
- Ngaya Club (Mdé)
- Ngazi Sports (Mirontsy)

== S ==
- Steal Nouvel FC (Sima)

== U ==
- US de Séléa
- US de Ntsaoueni
- US Zilimadjou

== V ==
- Volcan Club (Moroni)
