= 2024 COSAFA Cup squads =

The 2024 COSAFA Cup is the 23rd edition of the annual COSAFA Cup, held in Gqeberha, South Africa from 26 June to 7 July 2024. Twelve national teams were involved in the tournament: eleven teams from COSAFA and one team from CECAFA, who were invited as guests. Each national team registered a squad of 23 players.

The age listed for each player is on 26 June 2024, the first day of the tournament. The numbers of caps and goals listed for each player do not include any matches played after the start of tournament. The club listed is the club for which the player last played a competitive match prior to the tournament. The nationality for each club reflects the national association (not the league) to which the club is affiliated. A flag is included for coaches that are of a different nationality than their own national team.

== Group A ==
=== Botswana ===
Coach: (France) Didier Gomes Da Rosa

A preliminary squad was announced on 18 June 2024. The squad was reduced to 23 players before the beginning of the tournament.

| No. | Pos. | Player | Date of birth (age) | Caps | Goals | Club |
|---|---|---|---|---|---|---|
| 1 | GK | Karamelo Kgosipula | 6 February 2003 (aged 21) | | | (Botswana Football Association) Matebele |
| 2 | DF | Botsile Sakana | 26 January 2001 (aged 23) | | | (Botswana Football Association) Masitaoka |
| 3 | DF | Thabo Babutsi | 24 July 2000 (aged 23) | | | (Botswana Football Association) Township Rollers3 |
| 4 | DF | Obakeng Senono | 29 September 1999 (aged 24) | | | (Botswana Football Association) Masitaoka |
| 5 | DF | Bonno Sepako | | | | (Botswana Football Association) UB Hawks |
| 6 | MF | Ricky Ratlhogo | 8 December 2000 (aged 23) | | | (Botswana Football Association) Orapa United |
| 7 | FW | Oarabile Sekwai | 28 November 1998 (aged 25) | | | (Botswana Football Association) Police XI |
| 8 | MF | Olebogeng Ramotse | 17 January 1998 (aged 26) | | | (Botswana Football Association) Masitaoka |
| 9 | FW | Molaodi Tlhalefang | 7 July 1997 (aged 26) | | | (Botswana Football Association) Miscellaneous SC Serowe |
| 10 | FW | Eric Ookame | 3 April 2001 (aged 23) | | | (Botswana Football Association) Eleven Angels |
| 11 | FW | Lizo Skweyiya | 1 January 2004 (aged 20) | | | (South African Football Association) Orlando Pirates |
| 12 | MF | Tlamelo Kolagano | 2 August 2001 (aged 22) | | | (Botswana Football Association) Jwaneng Galaxy |
| 13 | DF | Atamelang Lesogo | | | | (Botswana Football Association) Orapa United |
| 14 | DF | Leruo Ratala | 28 March 2002 (aged 22) | | | (Botswana Football Association) Gaborone United |
| 15 | FW | Tshepo Keselebale | | | | (Botswana Football Association) Security Systems |
| 16 | GK | Kenneth Mmoko | 13 October 1999 (aged 24) | | | (Botswana Football Association) Sua Flamingoes |
| 17 | MF | Boniface Ramolale | 3 April 2002 (aged 22) | | | (Botswana Football Association) Masitaoka |
| 18 | MF | Obakeng Ramotlhwa | 26 July 1999 (aged 24) | | | (Botswana Football Association) Masitaoka |
| 19 | FW | Thabiso Bante | 25 April 1995 (aged 29) | | | (Botswana Football Association) TAFIC |
| 20 | DF | Tebogo Kopelang | 24 April 2000 (aged 24) | | | (Botswana Football Association) Security Systems |
| 21 | MF | Tawana Mbakile | 14 July 2000 (aged 23) | | | (Botswana Football Association) Security Systems |
| 22 | MF | Gape Thibedi | 2 February 2000 (aged 24) | | | (Botswana Football Association) Gaborone United |
| 23 | GK | Victor James | 27 August 2002 (aged 21) | | | (Botswana Football Association) Masitaoka |

=== Eswatini ===
Coach: Sifiso Ntibane

The squad was announced on 13 June 2024. Nkosingiphile Silenge and Sibonginkhosi Dlamini withdrew from the squad due to injury and were replaced by Vusi Vilakati and Samkelo Ginindza.

| No. | Pos. | Player | Date of birth (age) | Caps | Goals | Club |
|---|---|---|---|---|---|---|
| 1 | GK | Xolani Gama | 20 October 1999 (aged 24) | | | (Eswatini Football Association) Green Mamba |
| 2 | DF | Siphosethu Mabilisa | 19 September 2000 (aged 23) | | | (Eswatini Football Association) Mbabane Swallows |
| 3 | MF | Kwakhe Thwala | 4 April 2002 (aged 22) | | | (Eswatini Football Association) Mbabane Swallows |
| 4 | MF | Neliswa Dlamini | 28 December 2002 (aged 21) | | | (Eswatini Football Association) Mbabane Swallows |
| 5 | FW | Bongwa Matsebula | 27 November 1997 (aged 26) | | | (Eswatini Football Association) Young Buffaloes |
| 6 | MF | Samkelo Ginindza | 18 September 1992 (aged 31) | | | (Eswatini Football Association) Illovo |
| 7 | FW | Sambulo Simelane | 7 June 2001 (aged 23) | | | (Eswatini Football Association) Nsingizini Hotspurs |
| 8 | FW | Thubelihle Mavuso | 6 October 2001 (aged 22) | | | (Eswatini Football Association) Nsingizini Hotspurs |
| 9 | FW | Sizolwethu Shabalala | 5 August 1996 (aged 27) | | | (Eswatini Football Association) Mbabane Swallows |
| 10 | MF | Junior Magagula | 12 January 1995 (aged 29) | | | (Eswatini Football Association) Royal Leopards |
| 11 | MF | Leon Manyisa | 3 June 1999 (aged 25) | | | (Eswatini Football Association) Mbabane Swallows |
| 12 | MF | Innocent Dlamini | 8 December 1998 (aged 25) | | | (Eswatini Football Association) Green Mamba |
| 13 | DF | Colani Dlamini | 27 February 2000 (aged 24) | | | (Eswatini Football Association) Green Mamba |
| 14 | DF | Nkosingiphile Shongwe | | | | (Eswatini Football Association) Nsingizini Hotspurs |
| 15 | DF | Newman Philiso | 11 November 2003 (aged 20) | | | (Eswatini Football Association) Mbabane Swallows |
| 16 | GK | Sibusiso Dlamini | 10 October 2000 (aged 23) | | | (Eswatini Football Association) Nsingizini Hotspurs |
| 17 | DF | Vusi Vilakati | 7 May 2001 (aged 23) | | | (Eswatini Football Association) Mbabane Highlanders |
| 18 | FW | Ayanda Gadlela | 1 July 1998 (aged 25) | | | (Eswatini Football Association) Mbabane Swallows |
| 19 | DF | Gift Gamedze | 7 September 1999 (aged 24) | | | (Eswatini Football Association) Madlenya |
| 20 | DF | Mxolisi Manana | 31 January 1994 (aged 30) | | | (Eswatini Football Association) Green Mamba |
| 21 | MF | Bongiswa Dlamini | 4 April 2001 (aged 23) | | | (Eswatini Football Association) Young Buffaloes |
| 22 | DF | Simanga Masangane | 9 May 1997 (aged 27) | | | (Eswatini Football Association) Royal Leopards |
| 23 | GK | Siyabonga Magagula | | | | (Eswatini Football Association) Ezulwini United |

=== Mozambique ===
Coach: Victor Matine

A preliminary squad was announced on 1 June 2024. The final squad was announced on 24 June 2024.

| No. | Pos. | Player | Date of birth (age) | Caps | Goals | Club |
|---|---|---|---|---|---|---|
| 1 | GK | Acácio Muendane | | | | (Mozambican Football Federation) Costa do Sol |
| 2 | DF | Francisco Simbine | 7 April 1997 (aged 27) | | | (Bahrain Football Association) Al-Hala |
| 3 | FW | Chamito Alfândega | 14 January 2004 (aged 20) | | | (Mozambican Football Federation) Black Bulls |
| 4 | DF | Dias Fumo | 1 March 2002 (aged 22) | | | (Portuguese Football Federation) Farense |
| 5 | DF | Ossama Pedro | 18 August 2002 (aged 21) | | | (Mozambican Football Federation) Nacala |
| 6 | MF | Abel Joshua | 12 July 2000 (aged 23) | | | (Portuguese Football Federation) Oriental de Lisboa |
| 7 | MF | Dário Melo | 20 January 1996 (aged 28) | | | (Mozambican Football Federation) UD Songo |
| 8 | DF | Edmilson Dove | 18 July 1994 (aged 29) | | | (South African Football Association) Kaizer Chiefs |
| 9 | FW | Gabriel Pinho | 7 March 2001 (aged 23) | | | (Portuguese Football Federation) Fabril Barreiro |
| 10 | MF | Gianluca Lorenzoni | 22 February 2001 (aged 23) | | | (Malta Football Association) Gudja United |
| 11 | MF | Momed Ferreira | 2 October 2003 (aged 20) | | | (United Arab Emirates Football Association) Al Dhaid |
| 12 | GK | Armando Doutor | 20 April 2002 (aged 22) | | | (Mozambican Football Federation) Costa do Sol |
| 13 | DF | José Valipavai | 9 October 2003 (aged 20) | | | (Portuguese Football Federation) Sintrense |
| 14 | DF | Valter Daúce | 12 May 2002 (aged 22) | | | (Mozambican Football Federation) Ferroviário Beira |
| 15 | MF | Fernando José | 17 July 2005 (aged 18) | | | (Mozambican Football Federation) Black Bulls |
| 16 | MF | Júlio Carrelo | 8 January 2003 (aged 21) | | | (Mozambican Football Federation) Brera Tchumene |
| 17 | DF | Jeremias Nhambirre | 8 January 2000 (aged 24) | | | (Portuguese Football Federation) Marítimo |
| 18 | DF | Celton Jamisse | 23 January 2002 (aged 22) | | | (Mozambican Football Federation) Brera Tchumene |
| 19 | MF | Edmundo João | 22 August 2004 (aged 19) | | | (Mozambican Football Federation) Ferroviário Nampula |
| 20 | MF | Miguel Muchanga | 18 March 2003 (aged 21) | | | (Mozambican Football Federation) Costa do Sol |
| 21 | MF | Ussene Simango | | | | (Mozambican Football Federation) Brera Tchumene |
| 22 | GK | Ananias Tembe | 13 December 2003 (aged 20) | | | (Mozambican Football Federation) LD Maputo |
| 23 | MF | Orlando Tembe | 6 September 2001 (aged 22) | | | (Mozambican Football Federation) Black Bulls |

=== South Africa ===
Coach: Helman Mkhalele

A preliminary squad was announced on 14 June 2024. The final squad was announced a week later. Yanela Mbuthuma withdrew from the squad and was replaced by Lehlohonolo Mojela.

| No. | Pos. | Player | Date of birth (age) | Caps | Goals | Club |
|---|---|---|---|---|---|---|
| 1 | GK | Samukelo Xulu | 2 February 2001 (aged 23) | | | (South African Football Association) SuperSport United |
| 2 | FW | Mfundo Thikazi | 23 June 1999 (aged 25) | | | (South African Football Association) Royal AM |
| 3 | FW | Devin Titus | 18 May 2001 (aged 23) | | | (South African Football Association) Stellenbosch |
| 4 | DF | Sirgio Kammies | 7 February 1998 (aged 26) | | | (South African Football Association) Chippa United |
| 5 | DF | Malebogo Modise | 6 February 1999 (aged 25) | | | (South African Football Association) Chippa United |
| 6 | DF | Athenkosi Mcaba | 9 January 2002 (aged 22) | | | (South African Football Association) Stellenbosch |
| 7 | FW | Lehlohonolo Mojela | 18 September 1996 (aged 27) | | | (South African Football Association) TS Galaxy |
| 8 | DF | Thabo Moloisane | 24 February 1999 (aged 25) | | | (South African Football Association) Stellenbosch |
| 9 | FW | Ashley Cupido | 5 May 2001 (aged 23) | | | (South African Football Association) Cape Town Spurs |
| 10 | MF | Antonio van Wyk | 30 March 2002 (aged 22) | | | (South African Football Association) Stellenbosch |
| 11 | MF | Jaedin Rhodes | 11 April 2003 (aged 21) | | | (South African Football Association) Cape Town City |
| 12 | FW | Tshepang Moremi | 2 October 2000 (aged 23) | | | (South African Football Association) AmaZulu |
| 13 | FW | Thabang Sibanyoni | 8 January 1996 (aged 28) | | | (South African Football Association) Tuks |
| 14 | MF | Liam Bern | 6 March 2003 (aged 21) | | | (South African Football Association) Cape Town Spurs |
| 15 | DF | Keanu Cupido | 15 January 1998 (aged 26) | | | (South African Football Association) Cape Town City |
| 16 | GK | Olwethu Mzimela | 18 April 2001 (aged 23) | | | (South African Football Association) AmaZulu |
| 17 | DF | Thabang Matuludi | 14 January 1999 (aged 25) | | | (South African Football Association) Polokwane City |
| 18 | FW | Sinoxolo Kwayiba | 15 February 2000 (aged 24) | | | (South African Football Association) Chippa United |
| 19 | MF | Ethan Brooks | 1 March 2001 (aged 23) | | | (South African Football Association) AmaZulu |
| 20 | MF | Brooklyn Poggenpoel | 3 October 1999 (aged 24) | | | (South African Football Association) Chippa United |
| 21 | DF | Rushwin Dortley | 2 May 2002 (aged 22) | | | (South African Football Association) Cape Town Spurs |
| 22 | GK | Mondli Mpoto | 24 July 1998 (aged 25) | | | (South African Football Association) Royal AM |
| 23 | FW | Asenele Velebayi | 11 December 2002 (aged 21) | | | (South African Football Association) Cape Town Spurs |

== Group B ==
=== Comoros ===
Coach: (Madagascar) Hamada Jambay

The squad was announced on 23 June 2024.

| No. | Pos. | Player | Date of birth (age) | Caps | Goals | Club |
|---|---|---|---|---|---|---|
| 1 | GK | Adel Anzimati-Aboudou | 5 November 2001 (aged 22) | | | (French Football Federation) Quevilly-Rouen |
| 2 | DF | Mohamed Zamir | 28 October 1995 (aged 28) | | | (Comoros Football Federation) Volcan |
| 3 | DF | Bakri Youssouf | 1 July 1996 (aged 27) | | | (Comoros Football Federation) Djabal |
| 4 | DF | Omar Abdoul Anziz | 29 July 2002 (aged 21) | | | (Comoros Football Federation) Djabal |
| 5 | DF | Karim Saïd Mohamed | 2 April 2001 (aged 23) | | | (French Football Federation) Le Puy Foot 43 |
| 6 | MF | Haslane Alfonsi Ahmed | 28 December 2001 (aged 22) | | | (Djiboutian Football Federation) Arta Solar 7 |
| 7 | FW | Ibroihim Djoudja | 6 May 1994 (aged 30) | | | (Namibia Football Association) African Stars |
| 8 | MF | Kassim Hadji | 23 March 2000 (aged 24) | | | (Football Federation of Armenia) Ararat Yerevan |
| 9 | FW | Abdallah Saïd Sadad | 29 July 1994 (aged 29) | | | (Comoros Football Federation) Fombani |
| 10 | MF | Raïdou Boina Bacar | 4 August 1992 (aged 31) | | | (Comoros Football Federation) Fomboni |
| 11 | MF | Hilali Massulaha | 27 June 1996 (aged 27) | | | (Comoros Football Federation) Zilimadjou |
| 12 | DF | Ali M'Madi Ali | 10 June 2006 (aged 18) | | | (Comoros Football Federation) Atomic Foot |
| 13 | FW | Nasser Djanfar | 31 December 2000 (aged 23) | | | (Comoros Football Federation) Café Sport |
| 14 | DF | Tamine Tarek | 29 March 1998 (aged 26) | | | (Comoros Football Federation) Etoile d'Or |
| 15 | DF | Oubeidullah Soufiane | 25 December 1999 (aged 24) | | | (Comoros Football Federation) Gombessa |
| 16 | GK | Ahmed Fadjidou | 31 December 2000 (aged 23) | | | (Comoros Football Federation) Coca Bolé |
| 17 | FW | Affane Djambae | 22 September 2000 (aged 23) | | | (Comoros Football Federation) Djabal |
| 18 | MF | Abdele Wadide Hamada Nourou | 21 March 1999 (aged 25) | | | (Comoros Football Federation) Etoile du Centre |
| 19 | MF | Ali Mze Moudhoiffar | 8 August 1997 (aged 26) | | | (Comoros Football Federation) Etoile des Comores |
| 20 | FW | Nassurdine Idari | 25 January 2005 (aged 19) | | | (Comoros Football Federation) Zilimadjou |
| 21 | FW | Ali Mohamed | 8 July 1995 (aged 28) | | | (Comoros Football Federation) Volcan |
| 22 | MF | Naimoudine Assane | 5 January 1998 (aged 26) | | | (Comoros Football Federation) Volcan |
| 23 | GK | Djawadi Youssouf | 5 December 2001 (aged 22) | | | (Comoros Football Federation) Zilimadjou |

=== Kenya ===
Coach: Ken Odhiambo

The squad was announced on 24 June 2024.

| No. | Pos. | Player | Date of birth (age) | Caps | Goals | Club |
|---|---|---|---|---|---|---|
| 1 | GK | Dolph Junior | 8 December 2003 (aged 20) | | | (Football Kenya Federation) Gor Mahia |
| 2 | DF | Sylvester Owino | 6 May 2001 (aged 23) | | | (Football Kenya Federation) Gor Mahia |
| 3 | DF | Geoffrey Onyango | | | | (Football Kenya Federation) Kariobangi Sharks |
| 4 | DF | Paul Ochuoga | 13 September 2004 (aged 19) | | | (Football Kenya Federation) Gor Mahia |
| 5 | DF | Alphonce Omija | 9 October 2002 (aged 21) | | | (Oman Football Association) Dhofar |
| 6 | FW | Jeremy Bissau | | | | (The Football Association) Brooke House College |
| 7 | FW | Hassan Beja | 26 August 2005 (aged 18) | | | (Football Kenya Federation) AFC Leopards |
| 8 | MF | Stanley Wilson | | | | (Football Kenya Federation) Kariobangi Sharks |
| 9 | FW | Moses Shummah | 27 October 2002 (aged 21) | | | (Football Kenya Federation) Kakamega Homeboyz |
| 10 | MF | Austine Odhiambo | 16 December 1999 (aged 24) | | | (Football Kenya Federation) Gor Mahia |
| 11 | MF | Aldrine Kibet | 13 June 2006 (aged 18) | | | (Royal Spanish Football Federation) Gimnàstic de Tarragona |
| 12 | MF | William Gitamu | | | | (Football Kenya Federation) Bandari |
| 13 | MF | Elly Owande | | | | (Football Kenya Federation) Migori Youth |
| 14 | MF | Patrick Otieno | 24 December 2000 (aged 23) | | | (Football Kenya Federation) Posta Rangers |
| 15 | DF | Amos Wanjala | | | | (Royal Spanish Football Federation) Gimnàstic de Tarragona |
| 16 | MF | Rooney Onyango | 8 August 2001 (aged 22) | | | (Football Kenya Federation) Gor Mahia |
| 17 | MF | John Ochieng | 15 December 2003 (aged 20) | | | (Football Association of Zambia) Zanaco |
| 18 | GK | Ibrahim Wanzala | 16 March 2005 (aged 19) | | | (Football Kenya Federation) Kakamega Homeboyz |
| 19 | MF | Kaycie Odhiambo | 28 April 2003 (aged 21) | | | (Football Kenya Federation) AFC Leopards |
| 20 | MF | Chrispine Erambo | 10 December 2004 (aged 19) | | | (Football Kenya Federation) Tusker |
| 21 | FW | Alfred Tanui | 28 December 2002 (aged 21) | | | (Football Kenya Federation) Talanta |
| 22 | FW | Benson Omalla | 16 October 2001 (aged 22) | | | (Football Kenya Federation) Gor Mahia |
| 23 | GK | Byrne Omondi | 28 November 2000 (aged 23) | | | (Football Kenya Federation) Bandari |

=== Zambia ===
Coach: Chisi Mbewe

A provisional squad was announced on 21 June 2024. The final squad was announced four days later.

| No. | Pos. | Player | Date of birth (age) | Caps | Goals | Club |
|---|---|---|---|---|---|---|
| 1 | GK | Victor Chabu | 22 February 1994 (aged 30) | | | (Football Association of Zambia) Nchanga Rangers |
| 2 | DF | Mathews Banda | 6 August 2005 (aged 18) | | | (Football Association of Zambia) Nkana |
| 3 | DF | Brian Chilimina | 27 June 1997 (aged 26) | | | (Football Association of Zambia) Red Arrows |
| 4 | DF | Killian Kanguluma | 16 December 1999 (aged 24) | | | (Football Association of Zambia) Kabwe Warriors |
| 5 | DF | Chitoshi Chinga | 24 December 1998 (aged 25) | | | (Football Association of Zambia) Nkana |
| 6 | MF | David Simukonda | 10 August 2005 (aged 18) | | | (Football Association of Zambia) ZESCO United |
| 7 | MF | Abraham Siankombo | 2 March 1998 (aged 26) | | | (Football Association of Zambia) ZESCO United |
| 8 | MF | Dickson Chapa | 24 October 1996 (aged 27) | | | (Football Association of Zambia) NAPSA Stars |
| 9 | FW | Andrew Phiri | 21 May 2001 (aged 23) | | | (Football Association of Zambia) MUZA |
| 10 | MF | Saddam Yusuf Phiri | 9 September 1992 (aged 31) | | | (Football Association of Zambia) Red Arrows |
| 11 | FW | Albert Kangwanda | 7 April 1999 (aged 25) | | | (Sudan Football Association) Al-Hilal |
| 12 | FW | Jimmy Mukeya | 23 February 2002 (aged 22) | | | (Football Association of Zambia) Kansanshi Dynamos |
| 13 | DF | John Chishimba | 19 July 2002 (aged 21) | | | (Football Association of Zambia) ZESCO United |
| 14 | DF | Owen Mwamba | 24 July 1998 (aged 25) | | | (Football Association of Zambia) Mufulira Wanderers |
| 15 | MF | Kelvin Kapumbu | 6 April 1996 (aged 28) | | | (Football Association of Zambia) ZESCO United |
| 16 | GK | Willard Mwanza | 3 June 1997 (aged 27) | | | (Football Association of Zambia) Power Dynamos |
| 17 | MF | Owen Tembo | 16 May 1995 (aged 29) | | | (Football Association of Zambia) Power Dynamos |
| 18 | GK | Charles Kalumba | 21 January 1996 (aged 28) | | | (Football Association of Zambia) Red Arrows |
| 19 | MF | Frederick Mulambia | 10 July 2002 (aged 21) | | | (Football Association of Zambia) Power Dynamos |
| 20 | FW | Ricky Banda | 3 March 2001 (aged 23) | | | (Football Association of Zambia) Red Arrows |
| 21 | DF | Mathews Chabala | 19 July 2002 (aged 21) | | | (Football Association of Zambia) ZESCO United |
| 22 | MF | Austin Muwowo | 26 September 1996 (aged 27) | | | (Football Association of Zambia) Power Dynamos |
| 23 | DF | Zakaria Chilongoshi | 27 October 1999 (aged 24) | | | (Football Association of Zambia) NAPSA Stars |

=== Zimbabwe ===
Coach: Jairos Tapera

The squad was initially announced on 22 June 2024. The following day, a revised squad was announced with Nelson Chadya, Lynoth Chikuhwa, Thubelihle Jubani, Geoffrey Chitsumba, Farai Banda, Laslie Kashitigu, and Denis Nhongo being withdrawn while Raphael Pitisi, McKinnon Mushore, Godknows Murwira, Malvern Hativagoni, Joseph Kaunda, and Denzel Mapuwa were called up to replace them. A few days later, Simba Chinani and Farai Banda were called up to replace Joseph Kaunda and Tawanda Chisi.

| No. | Pos. | Player | Date of birth (age) | Caps | Goals | Club |
|---|---|---|---|---|---|---|
| 1 | GK | Marley Tavaziva | 17 December 2004 (aged 19) | | | (The Football Association) Brentford |
| 2 | DF | Emmanuel Jalai | 6 January 1999 (aged 25) | | | (Zimbabwe Football Association) Dynamos |
| 3 | MF | Tinotenda Meke | | | | (Zimbabwe Football Association) GreenFuel |
| 4 | DF | Shane Maroodza | 18 May 2004 (aged 20) | | | (The Football Association) Huddersfield Town |
| 5 | MF | Kingsley Mureremba | 19 January 2005 (aged 19) | | | (Zimbabwe Football Association) CAPS United |
| 6 | MF | Donald Mudadi | 2 June 1996 (aged 28) | | | (Zimbabwe Football Association) Dynamos |
| 7 | MF | Juan Mutudza | 12 April 1995 (aged 29) | | | (Zimbabwe Football Association) Platinum |
| 8 | MF | Tatenda Tavengwa | 29 March 1997 (aged 27) | | | (South African Football Association) Venda |
| 9 | FW | Never Rauzhi | 2 December 2001 (aged 22) | | | (Zimbabwe Football Association) Bulawayo Chiefs |
| 11 | MF | Panashe Mutimbanyoka | 21 February 2002 (aged 22) | | | (Zimbabwe Football Association) Platinum |
| 12 | DF | Farai Banda | 12 May 1993 (aged 31) | | | (Zimbabwe Football Association) Manica Diamonds |
| 13 | DF | Malvern Hativagoni | 2 September 2002 (aged 21) | | | (Zimbabwe Football Association) Bulawayo Chiefs |
| 14 | MF | McKinnon Mushore | 27 July 2000 (aged 23) | | | (Zimbabwe Football Association) Highlanders |
| 15 | FW | Denzel Mapuwa | | | | (Zimbabwe Football Association) GreenFuel |
| 16 | GK | Simba Chinani | 16 September 1995 (aged 28) | | | (Zimbabwe Football Association) Simba Bhora |
| 17 | DF | Isheanesu Mauchi | 28 November 2002 (aged 21) | | | (Zimbabwe Football Association) Simba Bhora |
| 18 | MF | Joey Phuthi | 2 January 2005 (aged 19) | | | (The Football Association) Sheffield Wednesday |
| 19 | FW | Michael Tapera | 18 July 1998 (aged 25) | | | (Zimbabwe Football Association) Manica Diamonds |
| 20 | FW | Takunda Benhura | 31 July 2001 (aged 22) | | | (Zimbabwe Football Association) Ngezi Platinum |
| 21 | DF | Godknows Murwira | 4 July 1993 (aged 30) | | | (Zimbabwe Football Association) CAPS United |
| 22 | GK | Raphael Pitisi | 16 October 2002 (aged 21) | | | (Zimbabwe Football Association) Highlanders |
| 23 | MF | Richard Hachiro | 27 January 1998 (aged 26) | | | (Zimbabwe Football Association) Ngezi Platinum |

== Group C ==
=== Angola ===
Coach: (Portugal) Pedro Gonçalves

The squad was announced on 21 May 2024. Before the beginning of the tournament, Rui Modesto and Joseph Nduquidi withdrew from the squad and were replaced by Hossi and Manu.

| No. | Pos. | Player | Date of birth (age) | Caps | Goals | Club |
|---|---|---|---|---|---|---|
| 1 | GK | Edmilson Cambila | 16 May 2002 (aged 22) | | | (Portuguese Football Federation) Estrela da Amadora |
| 2 | DF | Hossi | 12 June 2001 (aged 23) | | | (Angolan Football Federation) 1° de Agosto |
| 3 | DF | Domingos Kaly | 27 November 2003 (aged 20) | | | (Georgian Football Federation) Dila Gori |
| 4 | MF | Domingos Andrade | 7 May 2003 (aged 21) | | | (Portuguese Football Federation) Felgueiras |
| 5 | DF | Joel Da Silva Kiala | 21 January 2004 (aged 20) | | | (German Football Association) Hertha BSC II |
| 6 | DF | Mindinho | 18 November 2004 (aged 19) | | | (Angolan Football Federation) Petro de Luanda |
| 7 | FW | Picas | 14 February 2001 (aged 23) | | | (Portuguese Football Federation) Feirense |
| 8 | MF | Mauro Maya | 15 August 2004 (aged 19) | | | (Angolan Football Federation) Petro de Luanda |
| 9 | FW | Depú | 8 January 2000 (aged 24) | | | (Portuguese Football Federation) Gil Vicente |
| 10 | MF | Maestro | 4 August 2003 (aged 20) | | | (Turkish Football Federation) Adana Demirspor |
| 11 | FW | Manu | 9 November 2005 (aged 18) | | | (Angolan Football Federation) 1° de Agosto |
| 12 | GK | Landu Langanga | 15 October 1996 (aged 27) | | | (Angolan Football Federation) Sagrada Esperança |
| 13 | DF | Pedro Bondo | 16 November 2004 (aged 19) | | | (Portuguese Football Federation) Sporting CP B |
| 14 | MF | Pedro Agostinho | 30 July 2000 (aged 23) | | | (Angolan Football Federation) Lunda Sul |
| 15 | DF | Vidinho | 25 February 1998 (aged 26) | | | (Angolan Football Federation) Petro de Luanda |
| 16 | FW | Eliot Muteba | 20 June 2003 (aged 21) | | | (German Football Association) 1860 Munich |
| 17 | DF | Sandro Cruz | 12 May 2001 (aged 23) | | | (Portuguese Football Federation) Chaves |
| 18 | FW | Mankoka Benarfa | 25 January 2001 (aged 23) | | | (Angolan Football Federation) 1° de Agosto |
| 19 | FW | Miro | 22 April 2003 (aged 21) | | | (Portuguese Football Federation) Gil Vicente |
| 20 | MF | Berna | 15 September 2003 (aged 20) | | | (Portuguese Football Federation) Boavista |
| 21 | DF | Marsoni Sambu | 3 June 1996 (aged 28) | | | (Royal Belgian Football Association) RWDM |
| 22 | GK | Francisco Mangala | 8 July 1999 (aged 24) | | | (Angolan Football Federation) Interclube |
| 23 | MF | Manuel Keliano | 6 January 2003 (aged 21) | | | (Portuguese Football Federation) Estrela da Amadora |

=== Lesotho ===
Coach: Leslie Notši

The squad was announced 26 June 2024. Teboho Letsema and Lemohang Lintṧa withdrew from the squad due to club and work commitments and were replaced by Neo Mokhachane and Katleho Makateng. The following day, Tšepang Sefali withdrew due to injury and was replaced by Paseka Maile.

| No. | Pos. | Player | Date of birth (age) | Caps | Goals | Club |
|---|---|---|---|---|---|---|
| 1 | GK | Ntsane Molise | 30 July 1994 (aged 29) | | | (Lesotho Football Association) Linare |
| 2 | DF | Motlomelo Mkhwanazi | 5 November 1994 (aged 29) | | | (Lesotho Football Association) Bantu |
| 3 | DF | Rethabile Rasethuntša | 22 November 1994 (aged 29) | | | (Lesotho Football Association) Linare |
| 4 | MF | Tšepo Toloane | 15 July 1997 (aged 26) | | | (Lesotho Football Association) Lesotho Defence Force |
| 5 | MF | Tshwarelo Bereng | 30 October 1990 (aged 33) | | | (South African Football Association) Orbit College |
| 6 | MF | Lisema Lebokollane | 24 February 1993 (aged 31) | | | (Lesotho Football Association) Matlama |
| 7 | MF | Paseka Maile | | | | (Lesotho Football Association) Kick4Life |
| 8 | DF | Thabo Matšoele | 23 May 1993 (aged 31) | | | (Lesotho Football Association) Matlama |
| 9 | FW | Motebang Sera | 1 May 1995 (aged 29) | | | (South African Football Association) Royal AM |
| 10 | MF | Lehlohonolo Fothoane | 23 February 1997 (aged 27) | | | (Lesotho Football Association) Bantu |
| 11 | MF | Neo Mokhachane | 22 September 1996 (aged 27) | | | (Lesotho Football Association) Bantu |
| 12 | FW | Katleho Makateng | 20 September 1998 (aged 25) | | | (South African Football Association) Richards Bay |
| 13 | DF | Fusi Matlabe | 23 May 2000 (aged 24) | | | (South African Football Association) Mpheni Home Defenders |
| 14 | DF | Thato Sefoli | 22 May 1995 (aged 29) | | | (South African Football Association) Upington City |
| 15 | FW | Jane Thabantṧo | 22 January 1996 (aged 28) | | | (Lesotho Football Association) Matlama |
| 16 | GK | Sekhoane Moerane | 18 September 1997 (aged 26) | | | (South African Football Association) Orbit College |
| 17 | DF | Thabang Malane | 10 June 1997 (aged 27) | | | (South African Football Association) African All Stars |
| 18 | MF | Tumelo Khutlang | 23 October 1995 (aged 28) | | | (Lesotho Football Association) Lioli |
| 19 | MF | Lehlohonolo Matsau | 6 March 1997 (aged 27) | | | (Lesotho Football Association) Lesotho Defence Force |
| 20 | DF | Thabo Makhele | 17 December 1994 (aged 29) | | | (South African Football Association) Chippa United |
| 21 | DF | Rethabile Mokokoane | 6 April 1998 (aged 26) | | | (Lesotho Football Association) Matlama |
| 22 | MF | Tlotliso Phatsisi | 26 May 1999 (aged 25) | | | (South African Football Association) Black Leopards |
| 23 | GK | Tankiso Chaba | 27 December 1995 (aged 28) | | | (Lesotho Football Association) Lesotho Correctional Services |

=== Namibia ===
Coach: Collin Benjamin

The squad was announced on 26 June 2024.

| No. | Pos. | Player | Date of birth (age) | Caps | Goals | Club |
|---|---|---|---|---|---|---|
| 1 | GK | Branco Rukoro | 1 May 2005 (aged 19) | | | (Namibia Football Association) Desert Rollers |
| 2 | DF | Erasmus Ikeinge | 8 February 1995 (aged 29) | | | (Namibia Football Association) Khomas NAMPOL |
| 3 | MF | Tjipe Karuuombe | 21 September 2001 (aged 22) | | | (Namibia Football Association) UNAM |
| 4 | MF | Simon Elago | 7 October 2002 (aged 21) | | | (Namibia Football Association) Ongos Valley |
| 5 | DF | Charles Hambira | 3 June 1990 (aged 34) | | | (Namibia Football Association) African Stars |
| 6 | MF | Moses Shidolo | 20 May 1998 (aged 26) | | | (Namibia Football Association) Eeshoke Chula Chula |
| 7 | FW | George Frans | 1 November 1998 (aged 25) | | | (Namibia Football Association) Khomas NAMPOL |
| 8 | MF | Romeo Kasume | 21 October 1997 (aged 26) | | | (Botswana Football Association) Matebele |
| 9 | FW | Betuel Muzeu | 22 February 2000 (aged 24) | | | (South African Football Association) Black Leopards |
| 10 | MF | Lawrence Doeseb | 4 June 2003 (aged 21) | | | (Namibia Football Association) Eeshoke Chula Chula |
| 11 | FW | Erastus Kulula | 27 February 1997 (aged 27) | | | (Namibia Football Association) Blue Waters |
| 12 | MF | Edmund Kambanda | 25 February 1993 (aged 31) | | | (Namibia Football Association) African Stars |
| 13 | DF | Arend Abubakir | 17 March 2002 (aged 22) | | | (Namibia Football Association) Blue Waters |
| 14 | MF | Dawid Hafeni Ndeunyema | 22 August 2002 (aged 21) | | | (Namibia Football Association) Blue Waters |
| 15 | MF | Ben Namib | 20 August 1999 (aged 24) | | | (Namibia Football Association) Khomas NAMPOL |
| 16 | GK | Kamaijanda Ndisiro | 1 December 1999 (aged 24) | | | (Namibia Football Association) African Stars |
| 17 | MF | Fares Haidula | 17 October 1993 (aged 30) | | | (Namibia Football Association) Eeshoke Chula Chula |
| 18 | DF | Aprocius Petrus | 9 October 1999 (aged 24) | | | (South African Football Association) Cape Town City |
| 19 | MF | Paulus Amutenya | 22 July 2002 (aged 21) | | | (Namibia Football Association) UNAM |
| 20 | DF | Ivan Kamberipa | 3 February 1994 (aged 30) | | | (Botswana Football Association) Orapa United |
| 21 | DF | Ndjiraeree Maharero | 28 May 1994 (aged 30) | | | (Namibia Football Association) African Stars |
| 22 | DF | Baggio Nashixwa | 23 May 2002 (aged 22) | | | (Namibia Football Association) United Africa Tigers |
| 23 | GK | Jonas Matheus | 10 February 1996 (aged 28) | | | (Namibia Football Association) Ongos Valley |

=== Seychelles ===
Coach: Ralph Jean-Louis

The final squad was announced on 24 June 2024.

| No. | Pos. | Player | Date of birth (age) | Caps | Goals | Club |
|---|---|---|---|---|---|---|
| 1 | GK | Ian Ah-kong | 2 November 1995 (aged 28) | | | (Seychelles Football Federation) La Passe |
| 2 | MF | Gervais Waye-Hive | 11 June 1988 (aged 36) | | | (Seychelles Football Federation) Saint Louis Suns United |
| 3 | DF | Makhan Bristol-Cissoko | 26 June 2006 (aged 18) | | | (Seychelles Football Federation) Foresters Mont Fleuri |
| 4 | MF | Laurence Leon | 11 March 1996 (aged 28) | | | |
| 5 | DF | Don Fanchette | 3 December 1997 (aged 26) | | | (Seychelles Football Federation) La Passe |
| 6 | DF | Ellie Sopha | 3 November 2004 (aged 19) | | | (Seychelles Football Federation) St Michel United |
| 7 | FW | Brandon Labrosse | 11 March 1999 (aged 25) | | | (Seychelles Football Federation) Foresters Mont Fleuri |
| 8 | MF | Lorenzo Hoareau | 6 January 2007 (aged 17) | | | (Seychelles Football Federation) Saint Louis Suns United |
| 9 | DF | Nick Labiche | 8 July 1999 (aged 24) | | | (Seychelles Football Federation) Rovers |
| 10 | MF | Dean Mothé | 1 August 2000 (aged 23) | | | (Seychelles Football Federation) Saint Louis Suns United |
| 11 | MF | Tyrone Cadeau | 14 June 2004 (aged 20) | | | (The Football Association) Kidsgrove Athletic |
| 12 | DF | Warren Mellie | 1 October 1994 (aged 29) | | | (Seychelles Football Federation) Foresters Mont Fleuri |
| 13 | MF | Stephan Ladouce | 14 June 2005 (aged 19) | | | (Seychelles Football Federation) Saint Louis Suns United |
| 14 | DF | Anil Dijoux | 20 July 2006 (aged 17) | | | (Seychelles Football Federation) Northern Dynamo |
| 15 | DF | Markus Payet | 13 June 2005 (aged 19) | | | (Seychelles Football Federation) La Passe |
| 16 | DF | Johan Gamatice | 7 September 1998 (aged 25) | | | (Seychelles Football Federation) Saint Louis Suns United |
| 17 | MF | Lucas Panayi | 6 March 1997 (aged 27) | | | (Seychelles Football Federation) Northern Dynamo |
| 18 | GK | Romeo Padayachy | 18 February 1993 (aged 31) | | | (Seychelles Football Federation) Light Stars |
| 19 | DF | Justin Riaz | | | | |
| 20 | MF | Imra Raheriniaina | 19 November 2004 (aged 19) | | | (Seychelles Football Federation) St Michel United |
| 21 | MF | Vince Fred | 16 October 2005 (aged 18) | | | (Seychelles Football Federation) Light Stars |
| 22 | MF | Saverio Tsiahoua | 16 June 2004 (aged 20) | | | (Seychelles Football Federation) Anse Réunion |
| 23 | GK | Liam Esther | | | | (Seychelles Football Federation) Northern Dynamo |

== Player representation ==
=== By club ===
Clubs with 4 or more players represented are listed.

| Players | Club |
|---|---|
| 7 | (Eswatini) Mbabane Swallows |
| 6 | (Botswana) Masitaoka, (Kenya) Gor Mahia |
| 5 | (Namibia) African Stars, (Seychelles) Saint Louis Suns United, (South Africa) Chippa United, (Zambia) ZESCO United |
| 4 | (Eswatini) Green Mamba, (Eswatini) Nsingizini Hotspurs, (Lesotho) Matlama, (South Africa) Cape Town Spurs, (South Africa) Stellenbosch, (Zambia) Power Dynamos, (Zambia) Red Arrows |

=== By club nationality ===
| Players | CAF clubs |
|---|---|
| 37 | South Africa |
| 24 | Botswana |
| 23 | Eswatini, Zambia |
| 29 | Namibia |
| 20 | Seychelles |
| 18 | Comoros, Kenya, Zimbabwe |
| 14 | Lesotho, Mozambique |
| 9 | Angola |
| 1 | Djibouti, Sudan |

| Players | Clubs outside CAF |
|---|---|
| 14 | Portugal |
| 5 | England |
| 2 | France, Germany, Spain |
| 1 | Armenia, Bahrain, Belgium, (Georgia (country)) Georgia, Malta, Oman, Turkey, United Arab Emirates |

=== By club confederation ===
| Players | Clubs |
|---|---|
| 240 | CAF |
| 30 | UEFA |
| 3 | AFC |

=== By representatives of domestic league ===
| National squad | Players |
|---|---|
| Eswatini | 23 |
| South Africa | 23 |
| Botswana | 22 |
| Zambia | 22 |
| Seychelles | 20 |
| Namibia | 19 |
| Comoros | 18 |
| Kenya | 18 |
| Zimbabwe | 18 |
| Lesotho | 14 |
| Mozambique | 14 |
| Angola | 9 |
