= 2018 Comoros Premier League =

Comoros Premier League
- Season: 2018
- Champions: Volcan Club

The 2018 Comoros Premier League is the top level football competition in the Comoros.

== Regional leagues ==
=== Mwali ===
Pos	Team	Pld	W	D	L	GF	GA	GD	Pts	Qualification or relegation
1	Fomboni FC	14	11	3	0	45	11	+34	36	Champions
2	Belle Lumière (Djoiezi)	13	9	3	1	16	9	+7	30	
3	Ouragan Club (Mboigoma)	13	6	0	7	17	19	−2	18	
4	Mbatsé FC	13	5	1	7	15	20	−5	16	
5	Wemani Espoir	14	4	2	8	22	31	−9	14	
6	Onze Roquettes	13	3	4	6	13	18	−5	13	
7	Nouvel Espoir (Djando)	13	2	5	6	16	25	−9	11	Relegation to lower division
8	GS Kanaleni	13	2	4	7	14	25	−11	10	Relegation to lower division
9	FC Chihouzi (Nioumachoua)	0	0	0	0	0	0	0	0	Relegation to lower division/withdrew or excluded
10	Dynamique	0	0	0	0	0	0	0	0	Relegation to lower division/withdrew or excluded

Updated to match(es) played on 23 September 2018. Source:

=== Ndzuwani ===
Pos	Team	Pld	W	D	L	GF	GA	GD	Pts	Qualification or relegation
1	Etoile d'Or Mirontsy FC	18	11	7	0	29	11	+18	40	Champions
2	FC Ouani	18	11	5	2	29	10	+19	38	
3	Steal Nouvel FC de Sima	18	8	5	5	26	18	+8	29	
4	Gombessa (Mutsamudu)	18	7	5	6	19	19	0	26	
5	Ngazi Sport de Mirontsi	17	6	7	4	29	19	+10	25	
6	AS Daoueni	18	6	4	8	18	20	−2	22	
7	Miracle Club de Bandran	18	6	3	9	27	28	−1	21	Relegation to lower division
8	AS Komorozine de Domoni	18	4	5	9	21	30	−9	17	Relegation to lower division
9	Onze Fusées	17	4	3	10	15	32	−17	15	Relegation to lower division
10	US Bambao	18	1	4	13	18	47	−29	7	Relegation to lower division

Updated to match(es) played on 15 September 2018. Source:

=== Ngazidja ===
Pos	Team	Pld	W	D	L	GF	GA	GD	Pts	Qualification or relegation
1	Volcan Club de Moroni	22	13	8	1	43	17	+26	47	Champions
2	US Mbéni	22	12	5	5	49	38	+11	41	
3	Ngaya Club de Mdé	22	10	7	5	40	25	+15	37	
4	US Zilimadjou (Moroni)	22	8	10	4	30	18	+12	34	
5	JACM Mitsoudjé	22	9	6	7	28	26	+2	33	
6	Aventure Club (Ouellah)	22	8	8	6	34	31	+3	32	
7	Enfants des Comores (Vouvouni)	22	7	10	5	30	27	+3	31	
8	Élan Club de Mitsoudjé	22	8	6	8	29	22	+7	30	
9	Etoile des Comores (Nyumadzaha)	22	8	5	9	29	25	+4	29	Relegation to lower division
10	Etoile Polaire (Nyumamilima)	22	4	8	10	21	28	−7	20	Relegation to lower division
11	Etoile du Sud (Foumbouni)	22	4	4	14	22	46	−24	16	Relegation to lower division
12	Asceji Ivembeni	22	1	3	18	13	65	−52	6	Relegation to lower division

Updated to match(es) played on 23 September 2018. Source:

Note: Etoile du Sud (Foumbouni) had three points deducted.

== National championship ==
The champions of the three regional leagues of each island will take part in the final tournament to determinate the overall champions.

Team	Qualifying method
Fomboni FC	Champions of Mwali
Etoile d'Or	Champions of Ndzuwani
Volcan Club	Champions of Ngazidja

Final table.

Pos	Team	Pld	W	D	L	GF	GA	GD	Pts	Qualification
1	Fomboni FC	4	2	2	0	6	3	+3	5 (Note: Both Fomboni and Volcan Club 3 points deducted for witchcraft practices during matches (Volcan against Etoile d'or on Sep 27 and Fomboni against Volcan on Oct 4).)	Playoff (Note: Playoff necessary as both clubs were equal on points and w.r.t. head-to-head results (two 1-1 draws); overall goal difference is not a tie-breaker.)
2	Volcan Club (Moroni)	4	2	2	0	5	3	+2	5	Playoff
3	Etoile d'or (Mirontsi)	4	0	0	4	2	7	−5	0	

=== Championship playoff ===
[Oct 17, Stade de Domoni (Ndzuani)]

Fomboni awd Volcan Club [awarded 0-3, Fomboni dns]

== See also ==
- 2018 Comoros Cup
