= 2011 in Comorian football =

The 2011 in Comorian football is the 32nd edition of competitive football in Comoros.

== National teams ==
When available, the left column indicates the home team or the home team designate; the right column, away team or away team designate.

Win Draw Loss

=== Senior ===
==== 2012 Africa Cup of Nations qualification ====
28 March 2011 Group C	Libya	3–0	Comoros	Bamako, Mali
18:00 UTC+00	Mhadeb 20'; Wafa 70'; Abdallah 82'	(Report)		Stadium: Stade 26 mars Referee: Badara Diatta (Senegal)

28 March 2011 Group C	Comoros	1–1	Libya	Mitsamiouli, Comoros
15:00 UTC+03	Mbaba 83'	(Report)	Boussefi 43'	Stadium: Stade Said Mohamed Cheikh

2 September 2011 Group C	Comoros	v	Zambia	Mitsamiouli, Comoros
				Stadium: Stade Said Mohamed Cheikh

7 October 2011 Group C	Mozambique	v	Comoros	Maputo, Mozambique
				Stadium: Estádio da Machava

==== 2011 Indian Ocean Island Games ====
4 August 2011 Group A	Seychelles	0–0	Comoros	Victoria, Seychelles
14:00 UTC+04		(Report)		Stadium: Stade Linité; Attendance: 1,800; Referee: Steeve Dubec (Réunion)

6 August 2011 Group A	Comoros	v	Maldives	Roche Caiman, Seychelles
19:00 UTC+04				Stadium: People's Stadium

9 August 2011 Group A	Mauritius	v	Comoros	Roche Caiman, Seychelles
16:30 UTC+04				Stadium: People's Stadium

== Comoros Premier League ==
Pos	Team	Pld	W	D	L	GF	GA	GD	Pts	Qualification
1	Coin Nord de Mitsamiouli	9	6	2	1	18	8	+10	20	Qualification for 2012 CAF Champions League
2	Volcan Club	9	5	4	0	10	3	+7	19	
3	Selea	9	6	1	2	13	9	+4	19	
4	Élan Club de Mitsoudjé	9	4	3	2	9	6	+3	15	
5	Etoile des Comores	9	3	2	4	12	15	−3	11	
6	Ngaya Club	8	2	3	3	7	9	−2	9	
7	JACM Mitsoudjé	7	2	2	3	6	7	−1	8	
8	Ntsaoueni	9	2	2	5	7	11	−4	8	
9	Apache Club de Mitsamiouli	7	1	4	2	7	7	0	7	
10	Etoile Polaire	7	1	3	3	7	9	−2	6	
11	ASIM Itsandra	8	1	3	4	6	14	−8	6	
12	Djabal Club	7	0	3	4	5	9	−4	3	

Updated to match(es) played on 25 May 2011. Source: Soccerway
Rules for classification: 1) points; 2) goal difference; 3) number of goals scored.

== Comorian clubs in international competitions ==
Club	Competition	Final round
Elan Club	2011 CAF Champions League	Preliminary round

=== Elan Club ===
29 January 2011 Champions League preliminary round	Elan Club (Comoros)	0–0	(Tanzania) Simba	Mitsamiouli, Comoros
15:00 UTC+03		(Report)		Stadium: Stade Said Mohamed Cheikh

12 February 2011 Champions League preliminary round	Simba (Tanzania)	4–2	(Comoros) Elan Club	Dar es Salaam, Tanzania
16:30 UTC+03	Ahamada 45' (o.g.); Ochan 47'; Samata 56'; Ramadhan 71'	(Report)	Mohamed 43'; Sandjema 63'	Stadium: Benjamin Mkapa National Stadium
