= 2019 Comoros Premier League =

Comoros Premier League
- Season: 2019

The 2019 Comoros Premier League is the top level football competition in the Comoros.

== Regional leagues ==
=== Mwali ===
Final table.

Pos	Team	Pld	W	D	L	GF	GA	GD	Pts	Qualification or relegation
1	Fomboni FC	14	11	2	1	38	7	+31	35	Champions
2	FCN Espoir	14	6	2	6	18	20	−2	20	
3	Nouvel Espoir (Djando)	14	6	2	6	19	30	−11	20	
4	Mbatsé FC	14	5	3	6	23	24	−1	18	
5	Ouragan Club (Mboigoma)	14	5	3	6	14	15	−1	18	
6	Etoile du Centre	14	5	3	6	13	16	−3	18	
7	Belle Lumière (Djoiezi)	14	4	5	5	16	15	+1	17	Relegated
8	Wemani Espoir	14	3	2	9	15	29	−14	11	Relegated

=== Ndzuwani ===
Final table.

Pos	Team	Pld	W	D	L	GF	GA	GD	Pts	Qualification or relegation
1	Steal Nouvel (Sima)	18	11	5	2	36	14	+22	38	Champions
2	Etoile d'or (Mirontsi)	18	10	6	2	35	14	+21	36	
3	Gombessa (Mutsamudu)	18	9	6	3	30	15	+15	33	
4	FC Ouani	18	8	5	5	30	19	+11	29	
5	Ziarra Club (Sima)	18	8	4	6	24	20	+4	28	
6	AS Patsy	18	7	3	8	28	29	−1	24	
7	Atlético (Mutsamudu)	18	6	4	8	25	23	+2	22	Relegated
8	Miracle (Bandrani)	18	5	3	10	10	25	−15	18	Relegated
9	AS Daoueni	18	4	1	13	13	43	−30	13	Relegated
10	Café Sport	18	3	1	14	13	42	−29	10	Relegated

=== Ngazidja ===
Final table.

Pos	Team	Pld	W	D	L	GF	GA	GD	Pts	Qualification or relegation
1	FC Malé	22	12	5	5	31	21	+10	41	Champions
2	US Zilimadjou (Moroni)	22	10	9	3	35	17	+18	39	
3	Ngaya Club (Mdé)	22	9	10	3	38	24	+14	37	
4	Volcan Club (Moroni)	22	9	8	5	32	23	+9	35	
5	Elan Club (Mitsoudjé)	22	9	6	7	27	21	+6	33	
6	Enfants des Comores (Vouvouni)	22	8	6	8	35	31	+4	30	
7	Apache Club (Mitsamiouli)	22	9	3	10	32	30	+2	30	
8	JACM (Mitsoudjé)	22	8	5	9	29	32	−3	29	
9	Aventure Club (Ouellah)	22	6	9	7	29	31	−2	27	Relegated
10	US Mbéni	22	4	8	10	23	41	−18	20	Relegated
11	Les Abeilles (Mboudadju)	22	4	6	12	18	34	−16	18	Relegated
12	Amical Club (Chezani)	22	5	3	14	18	42	−24	18	Relegated

== National championship ==
The champions of the three regional leagues of each island will take part in the final tournament to determinate the overall champions.

Team	Qualifying method
Fomboni FC	Champions of Mwali
Steal Nouvel	Champions of Ndzuwani
FC Malé	Champions of Ngazidja

=== Table ===
Pos	Team	Pld	W	D	L	GF	GA	GD	Pts	Qualification or relegation
1	Fomboni FC (C)	2	2	0	0	6	0	+6	6	Qualification for Champions League
2	Steal Nouvel	2	1	0	1	3	4	−1	3	
3	FC Malé	2	0	0	2	1	6	−5	0	

Source: Comoros Football
(C) Champions

== National championship clubs' stadiums ==
Team	Location	Stadium	Capacity
Fomboni FC	Fomboni		
Steal Nouvel	Sima	Stade de Hombo	2,000
FC Malé			
