= 2016 Comoros Premier League =

Comoros Premier League
- Season: 2016
- Champions: Ngaya Club de Mdé

The 2016 Comoros Premier League was the top level football competition in the Comoros. It was played from 31 October to 20 November 2016.

== Teams ==
The champions of the three regional leagues of each island will take part in the final tournament to determinate the overall champions.

- Champions of Mwali: Fomboni FC (Fomboni)
- Champions of Ndzuwani: Steal Nouvel FC de Sima (Sima)
- Champions of Ngazidja: Ngaya Club de Mdé (Mdé)

== Standings ==
Pos	Team	Pld	W	D	L	GF	GA	GD	Pts
1	Ngaya Club (Mdé) (C)	4	2	2	0	6	3	+3	8
2	Fomboni Club (Fomboni)	3	1	1	1	5	2	+3	4
3	Steal Nouvel (Sima)	3	0	1	2	2	8	−6	1

(C) Champions
