= Football in the Comoros =

Football in Comoros
- Country: Comoros
- Governing body: Comoros Football Federation
- National team: men's national team
- Clubs: Comoros Premier League

Club competitions
- Comoros Premier League

International competitions
- Champions League; CAF Confederation Cup; Super Cup; FIFA Club World Cup; FIFA World Cup(National Team); African Cup of Nations(National Team)

Comoros joined the Confederation of African Football in 2003 following the formation of the Comoros Football Federation, the national football association, in 1979. Comoros were accepted as full members of FIFA in 2005. Association football is the most popular sport in the Comoros.

== Domestic league ==
At the highest level, the country's domestic competition consists of the Comoros Premier League and the Comoros Cup. Coin Nord is the country's most decorated club, having won the league title on six occasions.

== League system ==
Level	League(s)/Division(s)		
1	Ligue de Ngazidja; 12 clubs	Ligue de Nzwani; 10 clubs	Ligue de Mwali; 8 clubs
2	Ligue de Ngazidja (Division 2); 24 clubs divided in 2 series of 12	Ligue de Nzwani (Division 2); 20 clubs divided in 2 series of 10	
3	Ligue de Ngazidja (Division 3); 4 series		

== National football team ==
Following accession to FIFA's full member status, the Comoros national football team has competed for entry to the African Cup of Nations and World Cup since 2010; its qualifying campaigns for both competitions were unsuccessful. In the 2021 Africa Cup of Nations, the national football team of the Comoros reached the second round of the competition for the first time.

== Football stadiums ==
Stadium	City	Capacity	Image
Stade omnisports de Malouzini	Iconi	14,053	

== See also ==
- Lists of stadiums
