= Hamada Jambay =

Malagasy football player and manager (born 1975)

Personal information
- Date of birth: 25 April 1975 (age 51)
- Place of birth: Iconi, Comoros
- Height: 1.75 m (5 ft 9 in)
- Position: Right-back

Youth career
- 1984–1986: Trois Cités Marseille
- 1986–1993: Marseille

Senior career*
| Years | Team | Apps | (Gls) |
| 1993–1999 | Marseille | 113 | (4) |
| 1999–2001 | Toulouse | 43 | (0) |
| 2002–2005 | Sedan | 79 | (0) |
| Total | | 235 | (4) |

International career
| 1992 | France U17 | 3 | (0) |
| 1996 | France U21 | 1 | (0) |
| 2003–2007 | Madagascar | 4 | (0) |

Managerial career
- Comoros U21
- 2024: Comoros
- * Club domestic league appearances and goals

Hamada Jambay (born 25 April 1975) is a football manager and former professional player who played for as a right-back in the French Ligue 1 and Ligue 2. He is best known for his stint at Olympique de Marseille throughout the 1990s. Born in Comoros, Jambay grew up in France and played for the Madagascar national team internationally.

== Club career ==
Jambay debuted for Marseille in 1993 in the Ligue 1 and stayed with the team throughout their stint in the Ligue 2 from 1994 to 1996. He helped the team get promoted back to the Ligue 1, and was a pillar for the team famous for his occasional wondergoal.

After Marseille, he had spells with Toulouse FC and CS Sedan Ardennes. He retired in 2005, returning to Comoros where he became a businessman. He also coached his hometown team Djabal Club d'Iconi and helped them win their first Comoros Premier League title.

== International career ==
Jambay was born in Comoros and is of Malagasy descent through his mother. Raised in France, Jambay was originally a youth international for France. He chose to represent the Madagascar national team and represtend them from 2003 to 2007. He made his debut for Madagascar in a 3–1 loss against Algeria on 24 April 2003 in friendly game.

== Personal life ==
After retirement, Jambay had a stadium named after him in the Busserine district in Marseille, where he grew up.

== Honours ==
Marseille

- Ligue 2: 1994–95
