= FC Belle Lumière =

Football club based in Djoiezi, Comoros

Belle Lumière
- Full name: Football Club Belle Lumière de Djoiezi
- Founded: 2001; 24 years ago
- Ground: Stade de Djoiezi, Djoiezi, Comoros
- Capacity: 1,500
- League: Comoros Premier League
- 2022–23: Comoros Premier League, 6th

Football Club Belle Lumière de Djoiezi is a football club from the Comoros based in Djoiezi.

== History ==
=== Founding ===
It was founded in the year 2001 in the city of Djoiezi on the island of Moheli and has qualified for the national phase on several occasions. The first time was in 2003, although there is no certainty about who the national champion was that year.

=== Cups ===
In 2017, they were the national runners-up. They reached the final of the Comoros Cup for the first time in the 2023 season, where they lost to Djabal 2–4 in a penalty shootout after the match ended 0-0.

Since Djabal Club had qualified for the 2023-24 CAF Champions League as the national champion, FC Belle Lumière secured qualification for the 2023-24 CAF Confederation Cup, which they exited in the first round when they were supposed to face Ferroviário de Maputo from Mozambique.

== See also ==
- Comoros Premier League
- Comoros Cup
