= Hairu =

Hairu may refer to:

- HD 7199 b (planet), Star Emiw, Constellation Tucana; aka HIP 5529 b; named after the Makhuwa word for unity
- Hairu FC (soccer), Ngazidja, Comoros; a soccer team; see List of football clubs in the Comoros
- Hairu Ihei (Japanese: 伊丙 入, romanized: Ihei Hairu), a fictional character from Tokyo Ghoul, see List of Tokyo Ghoul characters
- Hairu Zhang (Chinese: 张海如, Zhang Hairu), a Ganzhou Communist Party Chief, predecessor to Pan Yiyang

== See also ==
- Jauro Hairu, Yola North, Limawa, Adamawa, Nigeria; a village; see List of villages in Adamawa State
- The dictionary definition of hairu at Wiktionary
- The dictionary definition of hairus at Wiktionary
