= Mroivili =

Mouad is a Comorian surname. Notable people with the surname include:

- Mahamoud Mroivili (born 1986), Comorian footballer
- Raouf Mroivili (born 1999), Comorian footballer
