= Mahamoud Mroivili =

Comorian footballer

Personal information
- Date of birth: 19 June 1986 (age 40)
- Place of birth: Mitsamiouli, Comoros
- Position: Goalkeeper

Team information
- Current team: Volcan Club

Senior career*
Years	Team	Apps	(Gls)
2007–2012	Coin Nord		
2012–	Volcan Club		

International career^{‡}
2008–	Comoros	11	(0)
- * Club domestic league appearances and goals as of 18:47, 25 November 2015 (UTC) ‡ National team caps and goals as of 18:47, 25 November 2015 (UTC)

Mahamoud Mroivili (born 19 June 1986) is a Comorian international footballer who plays for Volcan Club, as a goalkeeper.

== Career ==
Born in Mitsamiouli, Mroivili has played for Coin Nord and Volcan Club.

He made his international debut for Comoros in 2008.
