= 2018 Comoros Cup =

Tournament details
- Country: Comoros

Final positions
- Champions: Miracle Club

The 2018 Coupe des Comores is the 2018 edition of the Coupe des Comores, the knockout football competition of the Comoros.

== Teams ==
Qualified teams for national stage:

- Mwali: Belle Lumière (Djoiezi)
- Ngazidja: US Zilimadjou (Moroni)
- Ndzuani: Ngazi (Mirontsi), Miracle (Bandrani)

== Semifinals ==
[Sep 22, stade de Moroni]

US Zilimadjou 0-0 Miracle [5-6 pen]

[Sep 23, stade de Moroni]

Ngazi 4-2 Belle Lumière

== Final ==
[Sep 26]

Miracle 3-3 Ngazi [4-3 pen]

== See also ==
- 2018 Comoros Premier League
