= Comoros Premier League =

- Founded: 1979
- Country: Comoros
- Confederation: CAF
- Number of clubs: 30
- Level on pyramid: 1
- Relegation to: Second Division
- Domestic cup(s): Comoros Cup; Comoros Super Cup
- International cup(s): Champions League; Confederation Cup
- Current champions: Foboni FC (2026—27)
- Most championships: Coin Nord (7)
- Current: 2026–27 Comoros Premier League

The Comoros Premier League is the top division in Comoros. It was created in 1979. Some league games take place in front of hundreds of spectators.

== 2021–22 Comoros Premier League ==
=== Regional Leagues ===
==== Grande Comoros (Ngazidja) League ====
- Alizé Fort
- Aventure Club
- Djabal Club
- Élan Club
- Étoile des Comores
- FC Malé
- Hantsindzi
- JAC Mitsoudjé
- Ngaya Club
- US Ntsaoueni
- Volcan Club
- US Zilimadjou

==== Mohéli (Mwali) League ====
- Arsenal Mlabanda
- Belle Lumière
- Etoile du Centre
- FC Chihouzi
- FCN Espoir
- Fomboni FC
- Nouvel Espoir
- Ouragan Club

==== Anjouan (Nzwani) League ====
- AS Daoueni
- Chirazienne OC
- Etoile d'Or
- FC Atlético de Mutsamudu
- Gombessa Sport
- JS Bazimini
- Komorozine de Domoni
- Ngazi Sport
- Steal Nouvel FC
- Yakélé Sport

=== Final tournament ===
The champions of the three regional leagues will take part in the final tournament to determinate the champion.

== Venues ==
- Stade Said Mohamed Cheikh
- Stade De Moroni
- Stade De Hombo
- Stade Oumoini
- Stade De Moronisty
- Stade De Mdé
- Stade De Mitsoudjé Hambou

== Previous winners ==
- 1979–80 : Coin Nord (Mitsamiouli)
- 1980–83 : not known
- 1983–84 : not known
- 1984–85 : not known
- 1985–86 : Coin Nord (Mitsamiouli)
- 1986–89 : not known
- 1989–90 : Coin Nord (Mitsamiouli)
- 1990–91 : Étoile du Sud (Foumboni)
- 1991–92 : Étoile du Sud (Foumboni)
- 1992–93 : US Zilimadjou (Zilimadjou)
- 1993–94 : not known
- 1994–95 : Élan Club (Mitsoudjé)
- 1995–96 : Élan Club (Mitsoudjé)
- 1996–97 : not known
- 1997–98 : US Zilimadjou (Zilimadjou)
- 1998–99 : Volcan Club (Moroni)
- 1999–00 : not known
- 2000–01 : Coin Nord (Mitsamiouli)
- 2001–02 : Fomboni FC (Mwali)
- 2002–03 : not known
- 2003–04 : Élan Club (Mitsoudjé)
- 2005 : Coin Nord (Mitsamiouli)
- 2006 : AJSM (Mutsamudu)
- 2007 : Coin Nord (Mitsamiouli)
- 2008 : Etoile d'Or (Mirontsy)
- 2009 : Apache Club (Mitsamiouli)
- 2010 : Élan Club (Mitsoudjé)
- 2011 : Coin Nord (Mitsamiouli)
- 2012 : Djabal Club (Iconi)
- 2013 : Komorozine de Domoni (Domoni)
- 2014 : Fomboni FC (Mwali)
- 2015 : Volcan Club (Moroni)
- 2016 : Ngaya Club (Mdé)
- 2017 : Ngaya Club (Mdé)
- 2018 : Volcan Club (Moroni)
- 2019 : Fomboni FC (Mwali)
- 2019–20 : US Zilimadjou (Zilimadjou)
- 2020–21 : US Zilimadjou (Zilimadjou)
- 2021–22 : Volcan Club (Moroni)
- 2022–23 : Djabal Club (Iconi)
- 2023–24 : US Zilimadjou (Zilimadjou)
- 2024–25 : US Zilimadjou (Zilimadjou)
- 2025–26: Fomboni Club (Moroni)

== Performance By Club ==
Club	City	Titles	Last title
Coin Nord	Mitsamiouli	7	2011
US Zilimadjou	Moroni	6	2025
Volcan Club	Moroni	5	2026
Élan Club	Mitsoudjé	4	2010
Fomboni FC	Mwali	3	2019
Djabal Club	Iconi	2	2023
Étoile du Sud	Foumboni	2	1992
Ngaya Club	Mdé	2	2017
AJSM	Mutsamudu	1	2006
Etoile d'Or	Mirontsy	1	2008
Apache Club	Mitsamiouli	1	2009
Komorozine de Domoni	Domoni	1	2013

== Top goalscorers ==
Season	Goalscorer	Team	Goals
2022–23	(Comoros) Affane Djambae	Djabal	15

=== Multiple hat-tricks ===
Rank	Country	Player	Hat-tricks
1	(Comoros)	Affane Djambae	2
2	Several players		1

== See also ==
- Comoros Cup
- Comoros Super Cup
