= Affane Djambae =

Comorian footballer (born 2000)

Personal information
- Full name: Affane Saïd Djambae
- Date of birth: 22 September 2000 (age 26)
- Place of birth: Hahaya, Comoros
- Height: 1.75 m (5 ft 9 in)
- Position: Striker

Youth career
- 2014–2019: Hahaya

Senior career*
Years	Team	Apps	(Gls)
2019–2020	OPM Mbachilé	19	(15)
2020–2021	Hahaya	26	(20)
2021–2022	Ngaya Mdé	13	(7)
2022–2024	Djabal Club d'Iconi	22	(15)
2024–2025	AS Vita Club		
2025–2026	Masfout		

International career^{‡}
2023–	Comoros	7	(4)
- * Club domestic league appearances and goals ‡ National team caps and goals as of 13:55, 22 October 2024 (UTC)

Affane Saïd Djambae (born 22 September 2000) is a Comorian professional footballer who plays as a striker for the Comoros national team.

== Club career ==
Djambae comes from the Hahaya neighborhood of Comoros's capital Moroni. He joined the academy of local club Hahaya FC in 2014. He worked his way through the youth sides to the senior team by 2018. He was the top scorer of the third division three times with Hahaya. In 2019, he joined OPM of Mbachilé-Napabo where he remained until 2020. During his time with the club, Djambae was the top scorer in the Second Division both seasons. The following year he joined Ngaya Club de Mdé in the Comoros Premier League. Over his first thirteen matches of the 2020–21 season, he registered four assists and seven goals to top the scoring charts at that point.

Djambae moved to fellow Premier League club Djabal Club d'Iconi the next year and was the top scorer with fifteen goals during the 2022–23 season. That season, Djabal won both the league and Comoros Cup for the double with Djambae as a key contributor.

In July 2023, following his impressive performances with the national team at the 2023 COSAFA Cup, Djambae was invited to stay in South Africa to trial with Cape Town Spurs of the country's Premier Division. During his trial with the club, he came on in the 80th minute against UWC FC. Two minutes later, he scored from an overlapping run. The player considered the trial a success, but had to return home to negotiate a potential deal at a later point because club officials were on vacation. Following his time with Cape Town Spurs, Djambae joined Mauritanian champions FC Nouadhibou for a two-week trial in Morocco.

Following his standout performance at the 2023 COSAFA Cup, Djambae went on trial with Cape Town Spurs of the South African Premiership. However, a deal did not come to fruition. On 19 August 2023, he participated in the 2023–24 CAF Champions League with Djabal for the club's First Round match against South Africa's Orlando Pirates.

In July 2024, Djambae signed a three-year contract with AS Vita Club in the Democratic Republic of the Congo's Linafoot. He was offered the deal after another impressive display at the 2024 COSAFA Cup and three consecutive seasons as the Comoros Premier League's top scorer.

In 8 September 2025, Djambae signed with Masfout in the UAE First Division League.

== International career ==
Djambae was called up to the senior national team for the first time for the 2023 COSAFA Cup and made his debut on 6 July against the Seychelles. He scored in each of Comoros's first two matches, but the nation eventually failed to qualify for the knockout stages. Despite the team's inability to advance, Djambae received an individual honour as a member of the Tournament Best XI for the group stage. Later that summer, Djambae was included in the Comoros squad again for the 2023 Indian Ocean Island Games.

=== International goals ===
Last updated 30 June 2024.

No	Date	Venue	Opponent	Score	Result	Competition
1.	6 July 2023	King Zwelithini Stadium, Durban, South Africa	Seychelles	1–0	3–0	2023 COSAFA Cup
2.	9 July 2023	King Zwelithini Stadium, Durban, South Africa	Zambia	1–1	1–2	2023 COSAFA Cup
3.	30 June 2024	Isaac Wolfson Stadium, Gqeberha, South Africa	Kenya	1–0	2–0	2024 COSAFA Cup
4.	30 June 2024	Isaac Wolfson Stadium, Gqeberha, South Africa	Kenya	2–0	2–0	2024 COSAFA Cup
Last updated 30 June 2024

=== International career statistics ===
As of match played 5 July 2024

Comoros national team
Year	Apps	Goals
2023	3	2
2024	4	2
Total	7	4
