= Murwira (surname) =

Murwira is a surname. Notable people with the surname include:

- Amon Murwira, Zimbabwean politician
- Godknows Murwira, Zimbabwean footballer
