= Hayda Nourdine Sidi =

Comorian politician

Vice-President of the Assembly of the Union of the Comoros
- Incumbent
- Assumed office 5 April 2020
- President: Moustadroine Abdou
- Constituency: Mutsamudu I

Personal details
- Born: January 1977 (age 49)
- Party: Convention for the Renewal of the Comoros

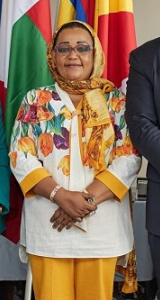
Sidi in 2023

Hayda Nourdine Sidi (born January 1977) is a Comorian politician. She has been a member of the Assembly of the Union of the Comoros since 2020.

== Career ==
Hayda Nourdine Sidi was born in January 1977 in Mutsamudu on Anjouan. She attended the Neimane private school in Mutsamudu for secondary education, followed by higher education at the Institute of Science and Commerce of Antananarivo in Madagascar. She then worked in telecommunications, as the manager of a company providing audio-visual services via satellite.

Following this role, she worked in social services with women and children who were survivors of abuse. From 2008 to 2011 she was the regional director of gender in Anjouan, and was promoted to a national role as director of gender, within the Ministry of Health, Solidarity and Gender Promotion from 2011 to 2013. From 2013 to 2016, she worked in the Anjouan civil service, as secretary general. In 2019 she was appointed deputy secretary general of the Ministry of Health.

In 2020 she was selected as a member of the Convention for the Renewal of the Comoros, and was elected in the first round of the Comorian legislative elections of 2020 for the constituency of Mutsamudu I. On 5 April 2020 she was elected vice-president of the Assembly of the Union of the Comoros. In 2021 she attended the investiture of the President of Niger, Azali Assoumani.
