= Olwethu =

Olwethu/Owethu is a South African given name meaning "ours". Notable people with the name include:

- Olwethu Makhanya (born 2004), South African soccer player
- Owethu Mbira (born 1987), South African boxer
- Olwethu Mzimela (born 2001), South African soccer player
