= AJS Mutsamudu =

- Full name: Association de la Jeunesse Sportive de Mutsamudu
- Ground: Stade Hombo; Mutsamudu, Comoros
- Capacity: 1,000
- League: Comoros Premier League

Association de la Jeunesse Sportive de Mutsamudu is a Comorian football club located in Mutsamudu, Comoros. It currently plays in the Comoros Premier League.

In 2006–2007 the team has won the Comoros Premier League.

== Honours ==
- Comoros Premier League: 1

2006-2007

== Stadium ==
Currently the team plays at the 1000 capacity Stade Hombo.
