= 2017 Comoros Premier League =

Comoros Premier League
- Season: 2017
- Champions: Ngaya Club de Mdé

The 2017 Comoros Premier League is the top level football competition in the Comoros.

== Foreign players ==
29 foreign players from different countries in Africa competed with Comorian clubs in 2017.

== Teams ==
The champions of the three regional leagues of each island will take part in the final tournament to determinate the overall champions.

- Champions of Mwali: Belle Lumière (Djoiezi)
- Champions of Ndzuwani: Etoile d'or (Mirontsi)
- Champions of Ngazidja: Ngaya Club (Mdé) [enter as 2016 champions] (due to other teams being disqualified)

== Standings ==
Pos	Team	Pld	W	D	L	GF	GA	GD	Pts
1	Ngaya Club (Mdé) (C)	4	3	0	1	8	5	+3	9
2	Belle Lumière (Djoiezi)	4	1	1	2	5	6	−1	4
3	Etoile d'or (Mirontsi)	4	1	1	2	3	5	−2	4

(C) Champions
