= Mirontsi =

Town in the Comoros

Coordinates: 12°09′S 44°24′E

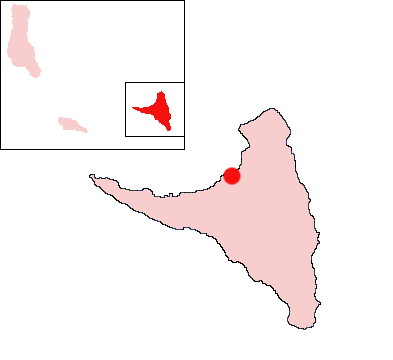
Location of Mirontsi on the island of Anjouan

Mirontsi is a town located on the island of Anjouan in the Comoros, located in the Mutsamudu prefecture.

The football team Ngazi Sport de Mirontsi is based here.

The town's population is estimated to be 10,168 in 2025, having decreased from 11,955 in the 2017 census.

== See also ==
- Mirontsy [fr]
