= Ngazi Sport de Mirontsi =

Ngazi Sport
- Full name: Ngazi Sport de Mirontsy
- Ground: Stade de Hombo; Mirontsi, Comoros
- Chairman: Abubakar Mgomri
- Manager: Mohamed Soilihi
- League: Comoros Premier League
- 2017: 2nd (Ndzuani championship)

Ngazi Sport de Mirontsi is a football club from the Comoros based in Mirontsi.

== Achievements ==
- Comoros Cup: 1

2017

== Performance in CAF competitions ==
- CAF Confederation Cup: 1 appearance

2018 –
