= Djabal Club d'Iconi =

- Founded: 1979
- Ground: Stade Zikoumbini, Iconi
- Capacity: 1,500
- Chairman: Ousman Mbarouk
- Head coach: Zainoudine Msoili
- Coach: Abdallah Mroivili
- League: Comoros Premier League
- 2023–24: 5th
Home colours

Djabal Club d'Iconi is a Comorian association football club located in Iconi, Comoros. It competes in the Comoros Premier League, the top tier of Comorian football. The club has won the Comoros Premier League twice, most recently in 2023. In 2023, the club also won the Comoros Cup to complete its first domestic double.

== History ==
Djabal Club d'Iconi, based in the town of Iconi on Grande Comore, was founded in 1979. Djabal Club won their first Comoros Premier League title in 2012. Djabal Club made their first appearance in the CAF Champions League in the 2013 tournament, losing 9–0 over two legs to South African side Orlando Pirates, who went on to reach the final of that year's competition. In the 2022–23 season, Djabal Club went undefeated after the first half of the regional competition concluded at the end of 2022. In June 2023 under head coach Zainoudine Msoili, Djabal Club won the Comoros Cup for the first time in their history, beating Belle Lumière 4–2 in a penalty shoot-out after the final had finished 0–0. They went on to win The Double that year after being confirmed as Premier League winners later that same month. In doing so, they became the third Comorian club to do the double after Apache in 2009 and US Zilimadjou in 2020.

In the 2023–24 season the club played in the CAF Champions League once more, again facing the Orlando Pirates. They lost 1–0 in the first leg at home, after suffering a late goal, followed by a 3–0 loss in the second game of the first qualifying round to exit the competition. Later the 2023–24 season, the club was deducted two points in their domestic league after reserve goalkeeper Taoufik Abdouroihim was found guilty of witchcraft, having held a metal coin during a league match against Étoile des Comores. The club finished the season in 5th place. Players to feature for the Comoros national team include Affane Djambae, Fasoiha Goula Soilihi and Chadhouli Mradabi.

== Honours ==
League

- Comoros Premier League
  - Champions (2): 2012, 2023

Cup

- Comoros Cup
  - Winners (2): 2023, 2025

== Performance in CAF competitions ==
- CAF Champions League: 2 appearances

2013 – preliminary round
2023–24 – first qualifying round
