= AS Komorozine de Domoni =

Association football club in Comoros

AS Komorozine
- Full name: Association Sportive Komorozine de Domoni
- Founded: 1974; 52 years ago
- Ground: Stade Oumoini; Domoni, Comoros
- Chairman: Amir Mwinyi
- Manager: Rafik Hassanein
- League: Comoros Premier League
- 2013: 1st

Association Sportive Komorozine de Domoni is a Comorian football club located in Domoni, Comoros. It currently plays in Comoros Premier League.

In 2013 the team has won Comoros Premier League.

== Honours ==
- Comoros Premier League: 1

2013

== Performance in CAF competitions ==
- CAF Champions League: 1 appearance

2014 – Preliminary round

== Stadium ==
Currently the team plays at the Stade Oumoini.
