= Domoni =

- Location of Domoni on the island of Anjouan
- Coordinates: 12°15′31″S 44°31′49″E
- Country: Comoros
- Island: Anjouan

Population (2012)
  - Total: 16,276
- Time zone: UTC+3 (Eastern Africa Time)
- Area code: 269

Domoni (population 15,351) is the second largest city on the Comorian island of Anjouan in the Indian Ocean and is located on the east coast of the island. It was the capital of the island in the past while the present capital of Anjouan is Mutsamudu.

== History ==
In ancient times, Domoni was the capital of the Nzwani sultans. According to archaeological finds the town was established in the 12th century. Domoni was already a flourishing centre for trade in the 15th century with Africa, Persia, Arab countries, and India. Archaeological artifacts indicated trades occurred with places as far away as Japan. Ibn Majid Ibn, a navigator who travelled in this area frequently and who had guided Vasco da Gama to India, confirmed this port as a major trading centre. It was ruled in the 16th century by many chiefs (known as Feni) who controlled different parts of the island. Until the end of the 18th century, it was the capital of the Anjouan sultanate. It is home to a significant chirazienne (Shirazi) population who are descents of Sunni aristocratic immigrants from Shiraz, Persia, between the 14th and 18th centuries.

Infighting among the chiefs of Anjouan resulted in their making an appeal to Europeans to broker a peace deal. Following this, Comoros initially became a French Protectorate in 1886, and in 1909, the French made it a part of their country. In 1975 the three islands formed a Republic of the Comoro Island. The first president of the Republic was Ahmed Abdallah, who hailed from Domoni and whose mausoleum is also located there. There were upheavals in the political dispensation in 1997 and again a rebellion in 2008 which was put down.

Mwenye Fani, who took the name Abdallah I when he became Sultan, transferred the capital from Domoni to Mutsamudu. Domoni is the birthplace of the first president of the Comorian Islands, Ahmed Abdallah, and of president Tadjidine ben Saïd Massonde. The third president was also resident of Domoni.

== Geography and climate ==
Domoni is located on the east coast of Anjouan.

Domoni is located on the east coast of Anjouan, also known as the island of Nzwani. Domoni is one of the three major towns of the island; the other two are Bambao and Mutsamudu; the latter is the capital of the island, in the western Indian Ocean. It is connected by road to Domoni, about 10 miles (16 km) away. Ngadzale-Ahajo lies to the southwest and Limbe and Koni-Djojdo lie to the northwest. The Ajajo River flows into the sea to the south. The airport on the island is in the village of Quani, 6 kilometres (3.7 mi) to the north of Mutsamdu. The population of the town is 15,351. Bambao is 6 kilometres (3.7 mi) away to the north. The old town is divided into three neighbourhoods: Hari ya muji, Maweni and Momoni.

The weather data in relation to temperature and rainfall is for the period 2000 to 2012. The maximum and minimum average temperatures recorded are 23 °C (73 °F) in December and 15 °C (59 °F) in August respectively. The average annual rainfall recorded is 1,059 millimetres (41.7 in) with a maximum of 264 millimetres (10.4 in) in December and a minimum of 23 millimetres (0.91 in) in July.

Climate data for Domoni, Comoros
Month	Jan	Feb	Mar	Apr	May	Jun	Jul	Aug	Sep	Oct	Nov	Dec	Year
Record high °C (°F)	22 (72)	21 (70)	20 (68)	21 (70)	19 (66)	22 (72)	20 (68)	19 (66)	18 (64)	21 (70)	21 (70)	23 (73)	23 (73)
Mean daily minimum °C (°F)	18 (64)	18 (64)	16 (61)	16 (61)	16 (61)	16 (61)	15 (59)	15 (59)	16 (61)	16 (61)	17 (63)	17 (63)	15.0 (59.0)
Average rainfall mm (inches)	222 (8.7)	171 (6.7)	111 (4.4)	102 (4.0)	42 (1.7)	15 (0.6)	36 (1.4)	15 (0.6)	24 (0.9)	15 (0.6)	42 (1.7)	264 (10.4)	1,059 (41.7)
Source: World Weather Online

== Landmarks ==
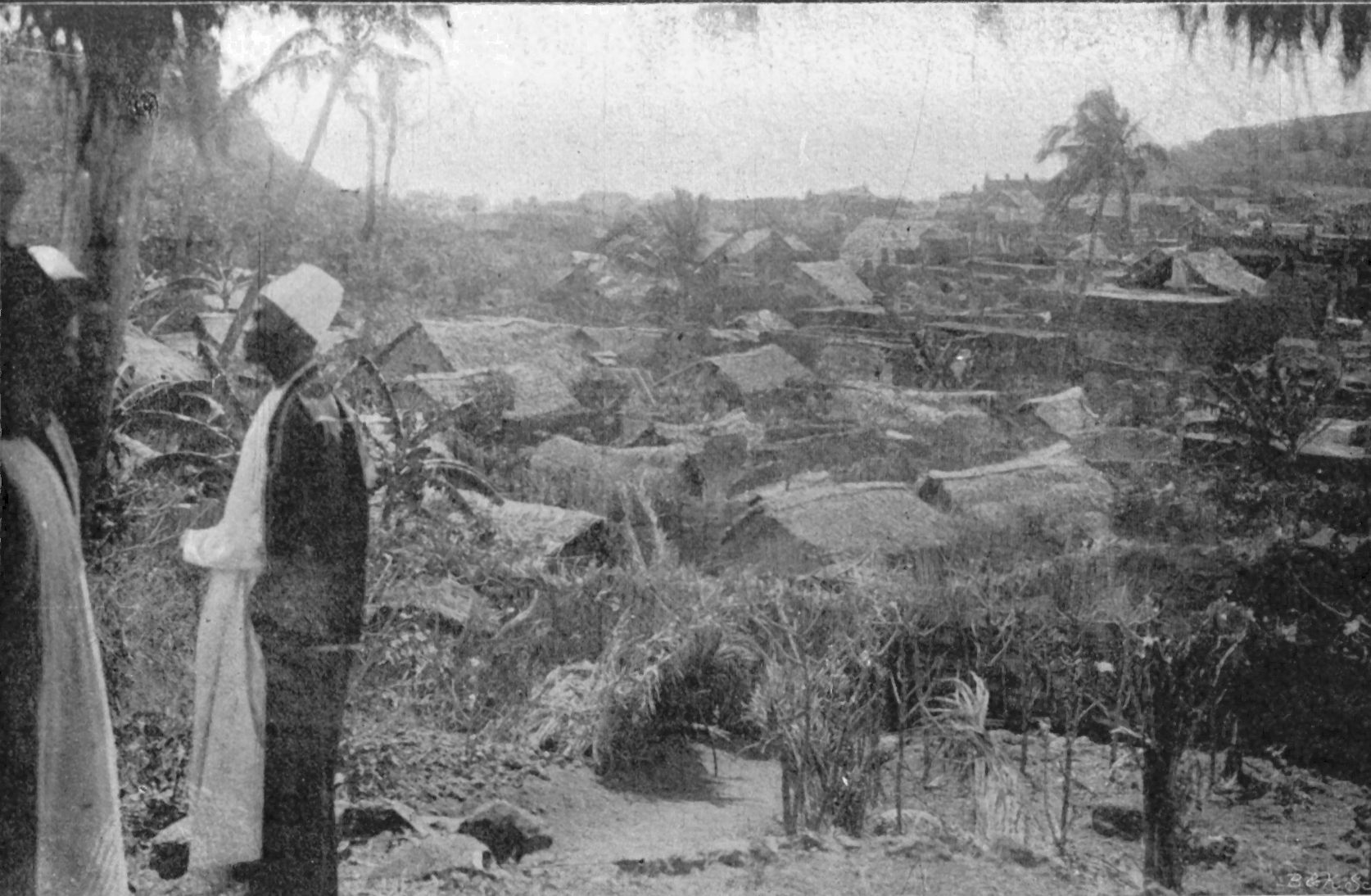
Domoni in 1900.

Oil slicks and trash has affected the aesthetic quality of the seafront area. Protective walls built as fortifications around the town were meant to prevent attacks by Malagasy pirates. A tower in the wall fortifications is in a state of ruin.

The first stone building in Domoni was built in the mid-13th century. The old houses built by Shirazis, who had migrated from Persia, are still seen in the town. The first mosques built were during the eleventh and twelfth centuries and reconstructed in the 13th century and enlarged substantially in the fourteenth and fifteenth centuries. One such mosque was the Mkiri wa Shirazi or the Shirazi Mosque. The mosques in the town are built in stone masonry over raised foundations. While most mosques have one mihrab oriented towards Mecca, the Shirazi Mosque is distinguished by having two mihrabs. The town's Friday mosque has the tallest minaret on the island, which is rectangular in shape.The middle section of the town, known as Hari ya Muzhi, was the centre of activity from the 16th century onwards. It is the zone where the main plaza, the Friday mosque and a large number of mansions of the town are located. The mausoleum of president Ahmed Abdallah Abderemane, who was assassinated in 1989 by a presidential guard, is white in colour and includes four tall minarets.

The town is known for its palaces and mansions of the 16th and 18th centuries, with a maze of houses with richly carved Swahili doors. The doors in mansions have lintels in stone relief work. The stone buildings in the town often have a thatched roof over their terraces.

== Culture ==
The town is renowned for its high quality wooden carvings. Delicate embroidery is made by local craftsmen. A colourful sight seen in the town is of women dabbing sandalwood paste on each other's faces while sitting on the staircase of the houses. Domoni's culture is described in two works by academics from Kansas State University, Marriage in Domoni by Martin Ottenheimer and Music of the Comoro Islands – Domoni by Martin and Harriet Ottenheimer. Women create music by using coconut shells, gongs, and sticks, as well as playing the tari (frame drum); men play on different musical instruments such as the fumba, dori, and msindio (drums), along with the gabus (lute), mzumara (double reed), nkayamba (rattle), and ndzedze (box zither). Wedding ceremonies feature a performance, a type of bullfight, evidence of the historical presence of the Portuguese at Domoni.

The town has witnessed scenes of religious intolerance. Incidents of religious harassment of Christians in the premises of mosques in Domoni have been reported. In April 2001 leaders of the Christian community were questioned and threatened by Islamic religious groups. In one incident the father of a Christian leader had to pay a fine and the family live in exile from Domoni for a month.

== Bibliography ==
- Andrew, David; Blond, Becca; Parkinson, Tom; Anderson, Aaron (2008). Madagascar & Comoros. Lonely Planet. ISBN 978-1-74104-608-3.
- Arens, William (1 January 1976). A Century of Change in Eastern Africa. Walter de Gruyter. ISBN 978-3-11-080009-8.
- Insoll, Timothy (3 July 2003). The Archaeology of Islam in Sub-Saharan Africa. Cambridge University Press. ISBN 978-0-521-65702-0.
- Knight, Charles (1854). The English cyclopedia: geography/. Bradbury et Evans.
- Lipton, Edward P. (1 January 2002). Religious Freedom in Africa. Nova Publishers. ISBN 978-1-59033-389-1.
- Niane, Djibril Tamsir; Ki-Zerbo, Joseph (1997). Africa from the Twelfth to the Sixteenth Century. University of California Press. ISBN 978-0-520-06699-1.
- Ottenheimer, Martin (1 January 1985). Marriage in Domoni: Husbands and Wives in an Indian Ocean Community. Waveland Press. ISBN 978-0-88133-098-4.
- Ottenheimer, Martin (1 January 1994). Historical Dictionary of the Comoro Islands. Scarecrow Press. ISBN 978-0-8108-2819-3.
- Penrith, James; Penrith, Deborah (2000). Madagascar, Mayotte & Comoros. Vacation Work. ISBN 978-1-85458-241-6.
- Shaw, Thurstan (1993). The Archaeology of Africa: Food, Metals and Towns. Psychology Press. ISBN 978-0-415-11585-8.
- Wane, Njoki N. (1 June 2009). A Glance at Africa. AuthorHouse. ISBN 978-1-4389-7489-7.
