= Djoièzi =

Village in Mohéli, Comoros

- Village
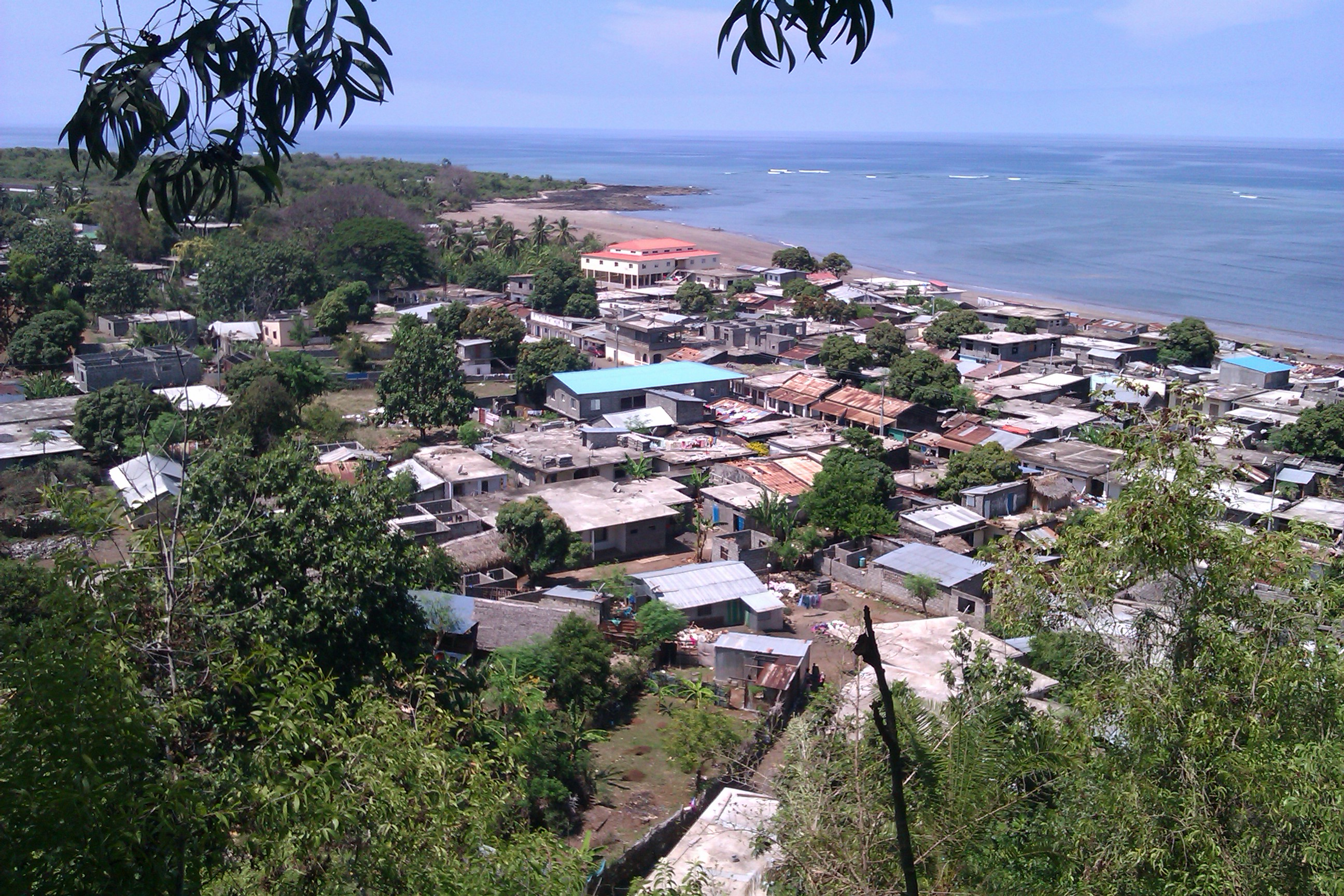

- Location in Comoros Djoièzi (Africa)
- Coordinates: 12°18′S 43°46′E
- Country: Comoros
- Island: Moheli

Population (1991)
  - Total: 1,636
  - Estimate (2020-2024): 2.100
- Time zone: UTC+3 (EAT)

Djoièzi is a village on the island of Mohéli in the Comoros. According to the 1991 census, the village had a population of 1,636.
