= Liam Bern =

South African soccer player

Personal information
- Date of birth: 6 March 2003 (age 23)
- Positions: Defender; defensive midfielder

Team information
- Current team: AmaZulu Football Club
- Number: 17

Senior career*
Years	Team	Apps	(Gls)
2021–2025	Cape Town Spurs	36	(0)
2025–	AmaZulu Football Club	3	(0)
- * Club domestic league appearances and goals as of 4 January 2026

Liam Bern (born 6 March 2003) is a South African soccer player who plays as a defender for AmaZulu Football Club in the Premier Soccer League.

Bern came through the academy of what was then called Ajax Cape Town, joining from Tableview at age 9. His first training session with the senior team of Cape Town Spurs came when he was 15, and he was moved up to the senior team in 2021. Here, he played two seasons in the National First Division, gaining promotion to the 2023–24 South African Premier Division.

In 2022, Bern went on trial with KV Mechelen in Belgium. He also helped launch a charity campaign called "Blikkies and Boots", aimed at donating sports gear and nutritional goods for the club Blikkiesdorp United FC.

During the 2023–24 Premier Division, Bern was moved from left back to defensive midfield. The manager Ernst Middendorp who took over during the season wanted Bern more centrally in the field.
