= Comoros Super Cup =

Football competition

- Founded: 2011
- Region: Comoros
- Current champions: Élan Club (2011)
- Most championships: Élan Club (1 title)

The Comoros Super Cup is a Comorian football competition, held as a game between the reigning champions of the Comoros Premier League and the Comoros Cup. The first edition was held in 2011.

== Winners ==
Year	Winners	Score	Runners-up	Venue
2011	Élan Club	0 – 0 (pen: 4–3)	Coin Nord	

== See also ==
- Comoros Premier League
- Comoros Cup
