= Comoros Cup =

- Founded: 1982; 44 years ago
- Region: Comoros
- Current champions: Alizé Fort (2024)
- Most championships: Coin Nord
- 2025 Comoros Cup

The Comoros Cup is the top knockout tournament of the Comoros football. It was created in 1982.

== Winners ==
Year	Winners	Score	Runners-up	Venue
1982–83	Coin Nord	–		
1983–84	unknown			
1984–85	Coin Nord	–		
1985–86	US Séléa	–		
1986–87	Coin Nord	–		
1987–88	Coin Nord	–		
1988–89	unknown			
1989–90	unknown			
1990–91	Gombessa Sport	–		
1991–92	Papillon Bleu	1–0 (aet)	Gombessa Sport	
1992	Faigaffe Club	–	US Zilimadjou	
1992–93	unknown			
1993–94	unknown			
1994–95	US Zilimadjou	2–1	Etoile d'Or	
1995–96	ES M'djoiezi	–		
1996–97	Gombessa Sport	–		
1997–98	unknown			
1998–99	unknown			
1999–2000	unknown			
2000–01	unknown			
2001–02	unknown			
2002–03	Coin Nord	–		
2003–04	Papillon Bleu	–		
2004–05	Élan Club	–		
2005–06	Volcan Club	–		
2006–07	Chirazienne FC	0–0 (4–1 pen.)	Gombessa Sport	
2007	JAC Mitsoudjé	5–4	Etoile d'Or	
2008–09	AJS Mutsamudu	1–0	Gombessa Sport	
2009	Apache Club de Mitsamiouli	3–0	Fomboni FC	
2010–11	Coin Nord	1–1 (4–2 pen.)	Fomboni FC	
2011–12	Étoile Polaire	1–1 (on pen.)	RC Barakani	
2012	Steal Nouvel	3–0	Enfants des Comores	
2013	Enfants des Comores	2–0	Nouvel Espoir	
2014	Volcan Club	3–0	Enfants des Comores	
2015	Fomboni FC	1–1 (5–4 pen.)	Ngaya Club de Mdé	
2016	Volcan Club	1–1 (5–3 pen.)	Fomboni FC	
2017	Ngazi Sport	2–2 (4–3 pen.)	Volcan Club	
2018	Miracle Club	3–3 (4–3 pen.)	Ngazi Sport	
2019	Yakélé Sport	1–1 (4–3 pen.)	Élan Club	
2020	US Zilimadjou	2–0	Ngazi Sport	
2021	Olympique de Missiri	3–1	FC Ouani	
2022	Gombessa Sport	4–1	Alizé Fort	
2023	Djabal Club	0–0 (4–2 pen.)	Belle Lumière	
2024	Alizé Fort	0–0 (3–2 pen.)	Etoile du Centre	
2025	Djabal Club	0–0 (3–2 pen.)	Fomboni FC	

== See also ==
- Comoros Premier League
- Comoros Super Cup
