= Élan Club de Mitsoudjé =

- Full name: Élan Club de Mitsoudjé
- Founded: 1962
- Ground: Stade de Mitsoudjé Hambou; Mitsoudjé, Comoros
- Chairman: Hamidou Rafion
- Manager: Moussa Alihadi
- League: Comoros Premier League
Home colours	Away colours

Élan Club de Mitsoudjé is a football club from the Comoros based in Mitsoudjé.

== Achievements ==
- Comoros Premier League: 4

1994–95, 1995–96, 2003–04, 2010.

- Comoros Cup: 1

2004–05.

- Comoros Super Cup: 1

2011.

== Performance in CAF competitions ==
- CAF Champions League: 1 appearance

2011 – Preliminary Round

- CAF Confederation Cup: 1 appearance

2006 – Preliminary Round

== Current Players ==
Note: Flags indicate national team as defined under FIFA eligibility rules; some limited exceptions apply. Players may hold more than one non-FIFA nationality.

No.	Pos.	Nation	Player
