= Olwethu Mzimela =

South African soccer player

Personal information
- Full name: Olwethu Thabiso Mzimela
- Date of birth: 18 April 2001 (age 25)
- Place of birth: Lamontville, South Africa
- Position: Goalkeeper

Team information
- Current team: AmaZulu
- Number: 1

Youth career
- Golden Arrows
- AmaZulu

Senior career*
Years	Team	Apps	(Gls)
2019–	AmaZulu	26	(0)
2025	→ Durban City (loan)		

International career^{‡}
- South Africa U-20
- South Africa U-23
2022–	South Africa	3	(0)
- * Club domestic league appearances and goals as of 31 October 2026 ‡ National team caps and goals as of 27 March 2024

Olwethu Mzimela (born 18 April 2001) is a South African soccer player who plays as a goalkeeper for AmaZulu FC in the Premier Soccer League.

Mzimela hails from Lamontville and attended Lamontville High School. He also played for local side Lamontville Golden Arrows, but was snapped up by AmaZulu in 2013. He played for AmaZulu's Diski Challenge team and was promoted to the first team in 2019. He played for South Africa U-20 and South Africa U-23.

In 2022, Mzimela was called up to Bafana Bafana by Helman Mkhalele for 2022 African Nations Championship qualification matches. Mzimela was then called up to the 2023 COSAFA Cup where he made his international debut and played 3 games.

Mzimela made his AmaZulu debut in the 2023-24 South African Premier Division in December 2023 against Mamelodi Sundowns. Mzimela replaced Veli Mothwa on an ad hoc basis to increase the competitiveness between AmaZulu's goalkeepers. Mzimela did not become the number one choice however, and in January 2025 he was loaned out to Durban City for the remainder of the season.
