= US Zilimadjou =

Football club in Moroni, Comoros

- Full name: Union Sportive de Zilimadjou
- Founded: 1983
- Ground: Stade de Moroni; Moroni, Comoros
- Capacity: 3,000
- Chairman: Ali Bakarou
- Manager: Djaïd Abdallahou
- League: Comoros Premier League
- 2024–2025: Champions

Union Sportive de Zilimadjou is a Comorian football club located in Moroni, Comoros. It currently plays in the Comoros Premier League.

US Zilimadjou is one of the most successful teams in Comoros Premier League history, having won the league 4 times, the most out of any team besides Coin Nord.

== Honours ==
- Comoros Premier League: 6

1992–93, 1997–98, 2019–20, 2020–21, 2023–24, 2024–25

- Comoros Cup: 3

1994–95
1997-1998
2019- 2020

== Stadium ==
Currently, the team plays at the 3000-person capacity Stade de Moroni.
