= Godknows Murwira =

Zimbabwean footballer (born 1993)

Personal information
- Date of birth: 4 July 1993 (age 33)
- Place of birth: Buhera, Zimbabwe
- Height: 1.78 m (5 ft 10 in)
- Position: Right-back

Team information
- Current team: Scottland

Senior career*
Years	Team	Apps	(Gls)
2012	Shabanie Mine		
2013	Monomotapa United		
2014	Shabanie Mine		
2015–2016	Dynamos Harare		
2017–2018	Ngezi Platinum		
2019	Platinum		
2019–2022	Dynamos Harare		
2023–2024	CAPS United		
2025–	Scottland		

International career^{‡}
2017–	Zimbabwe	17	(0)
- * Club domestic league appearances and goals as of 1 January 2025 ‡ National team caps and goals as of 19 November 2024

Godknows Murwira (born 4 July 1993) is a Zimbabwean professional footballer who plays as a right-back for Zimbabwe Premier Soccer League club Scottland and the Zimbabwe national team.

== International career ==
On 21 December 2021, Murwira was announced as a member of the Zimbabwe national team at the 2021 Africa Cup of Nations.

On 11 December 2025, Murwira was called up to the Zimbabwe squad for the 2025 Africa Cup of Nations.
