= Steal Nouvel FC de Sima =

Steal Nouvel FC
- Full name: Steal Nouvel FC de Sima
- Founded: 1967
- Ground: Stade de Hombo; Sima, Comoros
- Capacity: 2,000
- Chairman: Zaidou Mchindra
- Manager: Cheikh Choa
- League: Comoros Premier League
Home colours	Away colours

Steal Nouvel FC de Sima is a football (soccer) club from the Comoros based in Sima.

The club was founded in 1967.

== Achievements ==
- Comoros Premier League

Runner-up (1): 2008/09

- Comoros Cup

Winner (1): 2010/11

- Anjouan Championship

Champion (2): 2009, 2011

== Performance in UAFA competitions ==
- UAFA Cup: 1 appearance

2012–13 – 1st Round

== Current Players ==
Note: Flags indicate national team as defined under FIFA eligibility rules; some limited exceptions apply. Players may hold more than one non-FIFA nationality.

No.	Pos.	Nation	Player
–	GK	PHI	Lawrence Patangero
–	FW	COM	Miki
–	FW	Somali Region	Aziz Ndaiyee
–	FW	COM	Ibrahim Souleiman

No.	Pos.	Nation	Player
–		DJI	Yasser Rresdyaie
–		COM	Olmeta
–		Somaliland	Hamid Yassener
