= Sima, Comoros =

Town on Anjouan, Comoros

Coordinates: 12°11′57″S 44°16′27″E

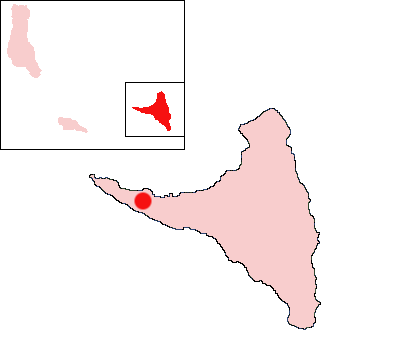
Location of Sima on the island of Anjouan

Sima is a town located on the island of Anjouan in the Comoros. It was the capital of the island during Shirazi rule. The abandoned ruins of "old" Sima are of archaelogical interest.

It has an estimated population of 11,000.
