= Etoile d'Or Mirontsy FC =

Etoile d'Or
- Full name: Etoile d'Or Mirontsy FC
- Ground: Stade de Mirontsy; Mirontsy, Comoros
- Capacity: 1,000
- Chairman: Ibrahim Mroivaza
- Manager: Mostoifa Saidani
- League: Comoros Premier League

Etoile d'Or Mirontsy FC is a Comorian football club located in Mirontsi, Comoros. It currently plays in the Comoros Premier League.

In 2008 the team has won the Comoros Premier League.

== Honours ==
- Comoros Premier League: 1

2008

== Stadium ==
Currently the team plays at the 1000 capacity Stade de Mirontsy.
