= Mitsoudjé =

- Town
- Location in Comoros Mitsoudjé (Africa)
- Coordinates: 11°49′S 43°16′E
- Country: Comoros
- Island: Grand Comore

Population (2012)
  - Total: 5,004
- Time zone: UTC+3 (EAT)

Mitsoudjé is a town located on the island of Grande Comore in the Comoros. It is also the birthplace of President Azali Assoumani.
