= Iconi =

Town in the Comoros

Coordinates: 11°44′43″S 43°13′58″E

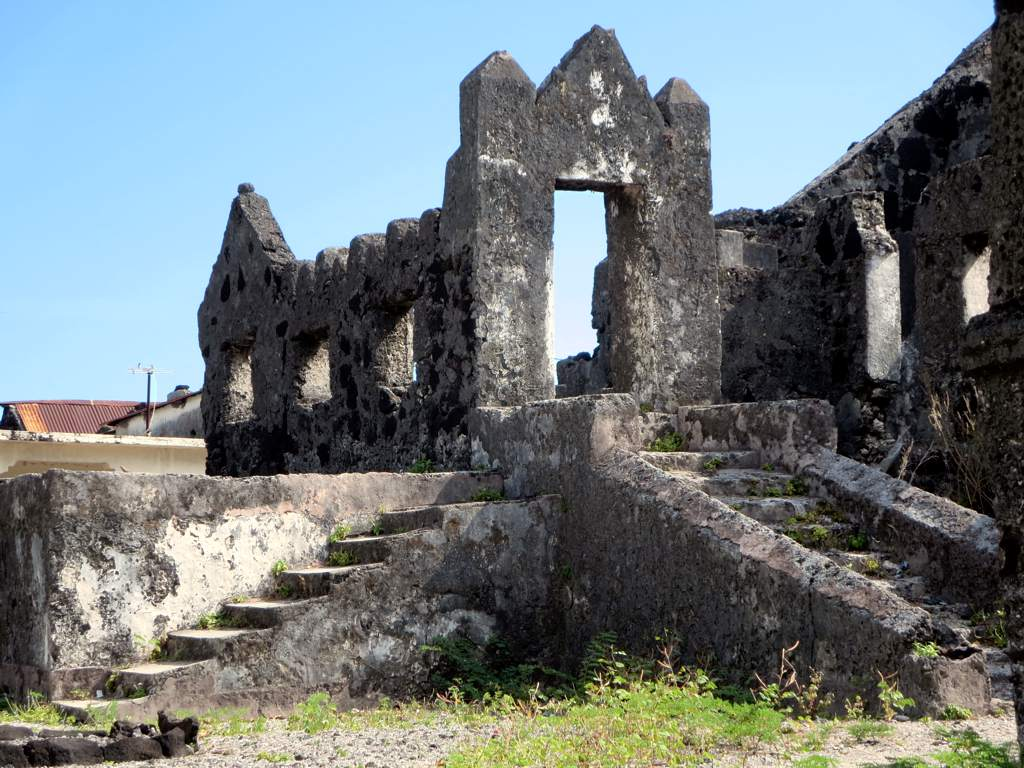
The Palais de Kaviridjeo at Iconi

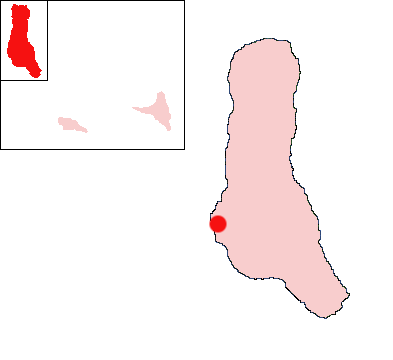
Location of Iconi on the island of Grande Comore

Iconi (or Ikoni) is a town on the island of Grande Comore in the Comoros.

== Notable people ==
- Maoulida Darouèche
