= Volcan Club de Moroni =

Volcan Club
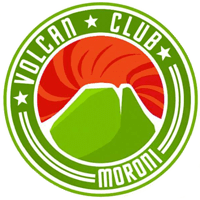
- Full name: Volcan Club de Moroni
- Nicknames: Les Verts; Yinu Ya Mdji; Veri Piya
- Founded: 16 June 1971
- Ground: Stade de Moroni, Moroni, Comoros
- Capacity: 4,500
- Chairman: Massoundi Assoumani
- Manager: Zainoudine Msoili
- League: Comoros Premier League
- 2021–22: Comoros Premier League, 1st

Volcan Club de Moroni is a football club from the Comoros based in Moroni.

== Achievements ==
- Comoros Premier League: 4

1998–99, 2015, 2018, 2022.

- Comoros Cup: 4

1983–84, 2005–06, 2014, 2016.

- Comoros Super Cup: 0

== Performance in CAF competitions ==
- CAF Confederation Cup: 1 appearance

2015 – Preliminary Round

- CAF Champions League: 1 appearance

2016 – Preliminary Round
