= Apache Club de Mitsamiouli =

Apache
- Full name: Apache Club de Mitsamiouli
- Founded: 1972
- Ground: Stade International Saïd; Mitsamiouli, Comoros
- Capacity: 3,000
- Chairman: ?
- Manager: ?
- League: Comoros Premier League

Apache Club de Mitsamiouli is a Comorian football club located in Mitsamiouli, Comoros. It currently plays in Comoros Premier League.

The club was founded in 1972. In 2009 the team has won Comoros Premier League.

== Honours ==
- Comoros Premier League: 1

2009

== Performance in CAF competitions ==
- CAF Champions League: 1 appearances

2010 – Preliminary round

== Stadium ==
Currently the team plays at the 3000 capacity Stade International Saïd.
