= Fomboni FC =

Football club in Fomboni, Comoros

- Full name: Fomboni Football Club
- Founded: March 1985
- Ground: El Hadj Ahmed Matoir Stadium; Fomboni, Mohéli, Comoros
- League: Comoros Premier League
Home colours	Away colours

Fomboni Football Club is a football club from the Comoros based in Fomboni.

The club was founded in 1985.

== Achievements ==
- Comoros Premier League: 4

2001–02, 2014, 2019, 2025–26.

- Comoros Cup: 1

2015.

- Comoros Super Cup: 0

== Performance in CAF competitions ==
- CAF Champions League: 2 appearances

2015 – Preliminary Round
2020 – Preliminary Round

- CAF Confederation Cup: 0 appearance

== Current Players ==
Note: Flags indicate national team as defined under FIFA eligibility rules; some limited exceptions apply. Players may hold more than one non-FIFA nationality.

No.	Pos.	Nation	Player
