= Ngaya Club de Mdé =

- Full name: Ngaya Club de Mdé
- Ground: Stade de Mdé, Mdé
- Capacity: 1,000
- Chairman: Youssouf Msaidié
- Manager: Hassan Mzeche
- League: Comoros Premier League
- 2017: 1st place

Ngaya Club de Mdé is a football club from the Comoros based in Mdé. They sometimes play home games in front of hundreds of spectators.

== Achievements ==
- Comoros Premier League: 1

2016

- Comoros Cup: 0

== Performance in CAF competitions ==
- CAF Champions League: 1 appearance

2017 – Preliminary Round

- CAF Confederation Cup: 0 appearance

== Current Players ==
Note: Flags indicate national team as defined under FIFA eligibility rules; some limited exceptions apply. Players may hold more than one non-FIFA nationality.

No. / Pos. / Nation / Player	No. / Pos. / Nation / Player
