= Coin Nord de Mitsamiouli =

Comorian football club

- Full name: Coin Nord de Mitsamiouli
- Founded: 1960
- Ground: Coin Nord Stadium; Mitsamiouli, Comoros
- League: Comoros Premier League
- 2014: 2nd place
Home colours	Away colours

Coin Nord de Mitsamiouli is a Comorian football club located in Mitsamiouli, Comoros. It currently plays in Comoros Premier League.

The club was founded in 1960.

== Titles ==
- Comoros Premier League: 7

1980, 1986, 1990, 2001, 2005, 2007, 2011

- Comoros Cup: 5

1983, 1987, 1988, 2003, 2011

== Performance in CAF competitions ==
- CAF Champions League: 3 appearances

2006 – Preliminary Round
2008 – Preliminary Round
2012 – Preliminary Round
