= Mutsamudu =

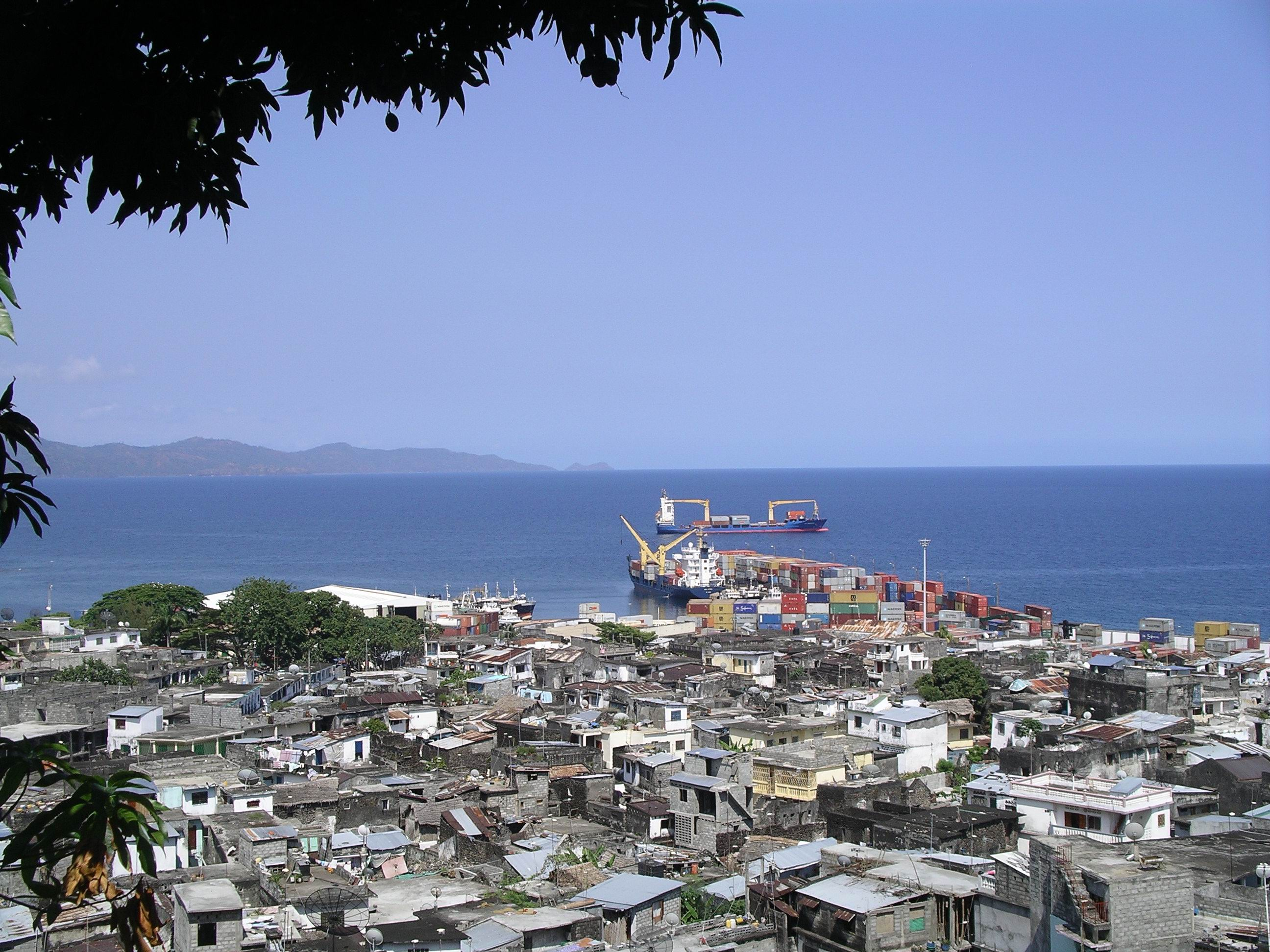
- October 2009 view of Mutsamudu and its port

- Location of Mutsamudu on the island of Anjouan
- Coordinates: 12°10′03″S 44°23′38″E
- Country: Comoros
- Island: Anjouan
- Founded: 1482

Government
  - Mayor: Sitti Echat Assadi
  - Local councillor, legal advisor in charge of the local police.: Ali Zamir

Area
  - Total: 30 km^{2} (12 sq mi)

Population (2010)
  - Total: 25,471
  - Density: 850/km^{2} (2,200/sq mi)
- Time zone: UTC+3 (Eastern Africa Time)
- Area code: 269

Mutsamudu (also known as Moutsamoudou) is the second-largest city in the Comoros. It is also the capital and largest city on the island of Anjouan as well the former home of former Comorian president Ahmed Abdallah Mohamed Sambi. It now houses a deep water port, an ancient citadel, and narrow streets with many shops and small crafts. The population in 2021 stood at 23,594.

== History ==
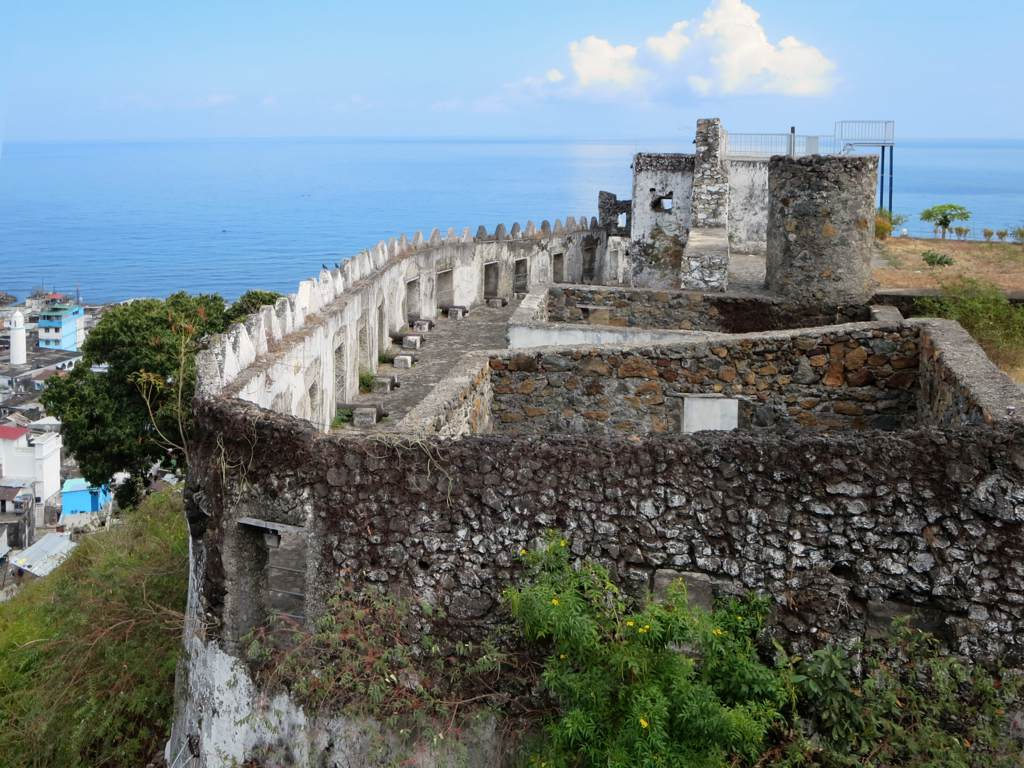
Citadel of Mutsamudu

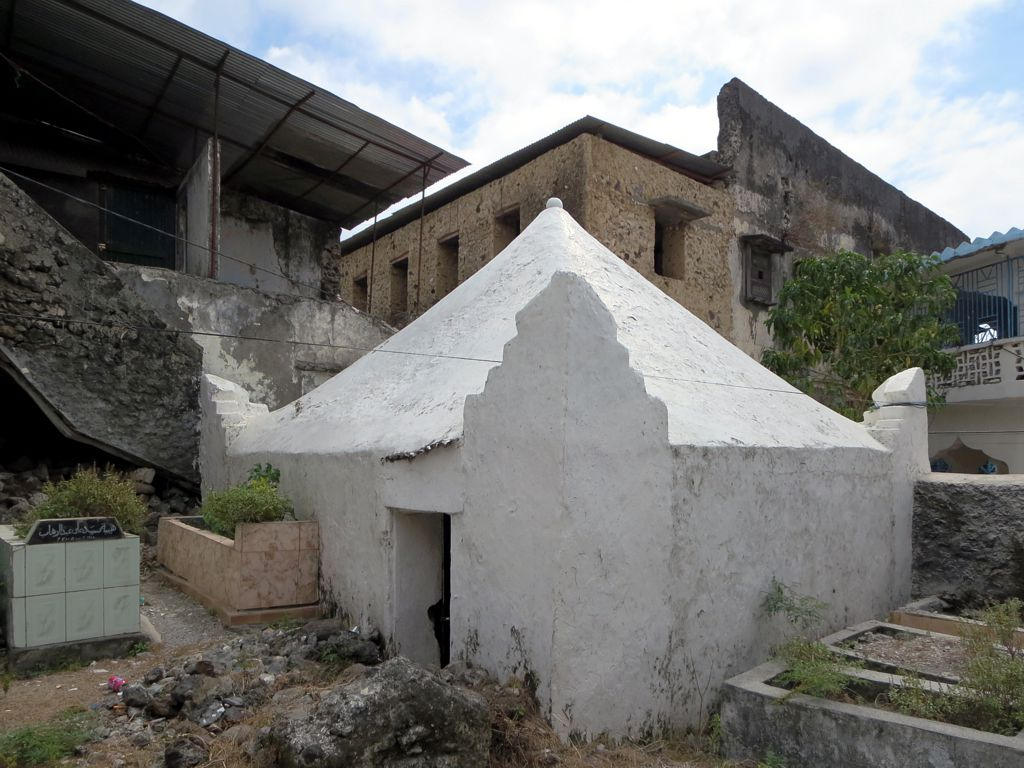
Islamic Tomb, next to the Friday Mosque

Mutsamudu was likely founded in 1482. It grew into a prosperous Swahili port, funneling traffic between the Swahili ports of Mozambique and Madagascar. Later Arab, Persian, Indian, Somali, and Malagasy sailors and traders settled in the town. By the 1700s, it was the most prosperous town in the Comoros Archipelago. During an expedition along the Swahili Coast in 1773, the commissioner Frederick Holtzappel visited the town. He expressed his admiration, noting that the houses were built with stone, whitewashed inside and out, had plank painted ceilings, and were thatched with coconut leaves. He also observed several two-story houses belonging to the "Turkified" elite. There were numerous public baths in town, and all of the elites had baths in their houses. According to Holtzappel, the men wore white linen gowns and turbans, as well as silk clothing and daggers with silver sheaths.

== Geography and climate ==
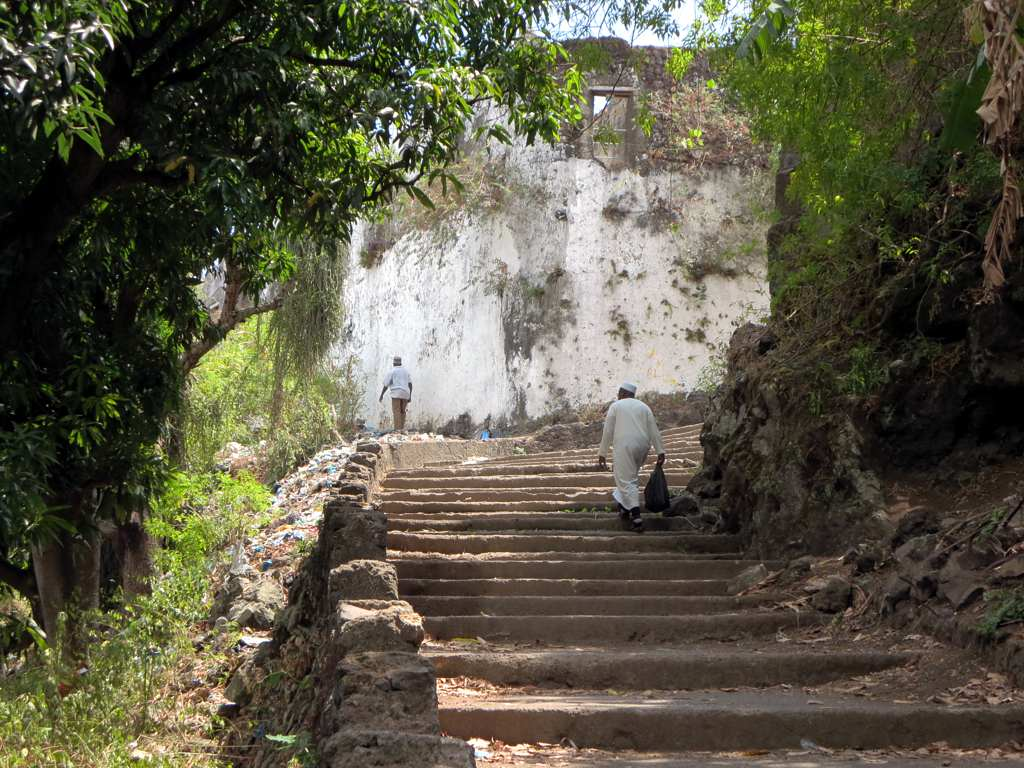
Stone stairway, Mutsamudu

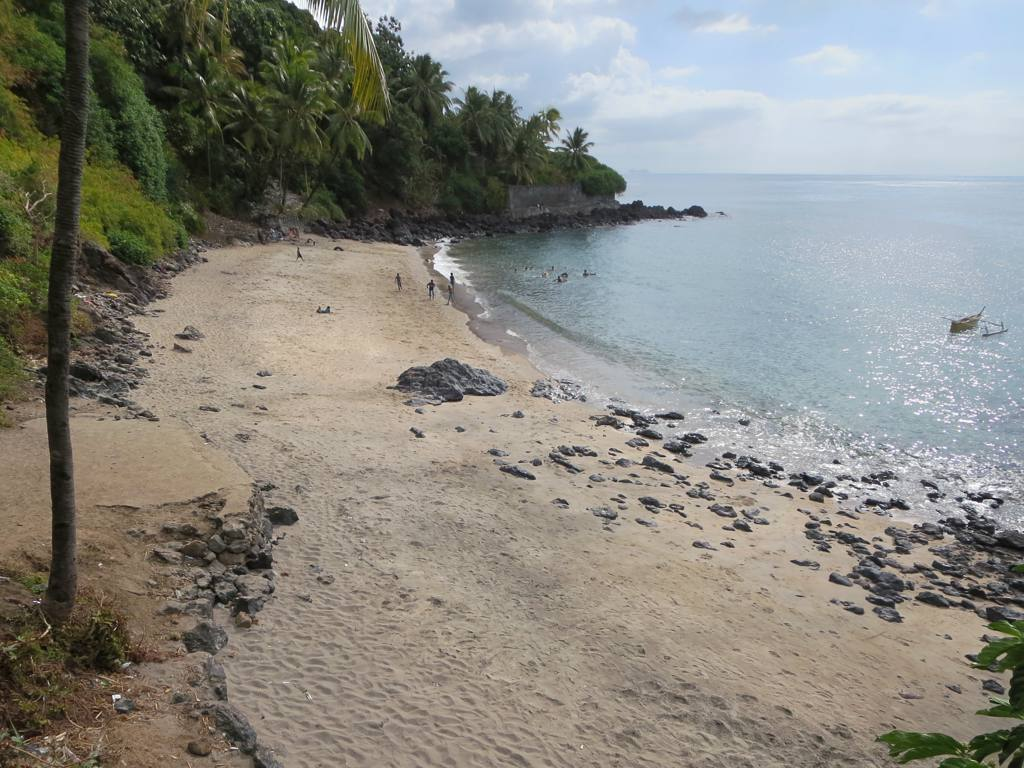
Al Amal Beach

Mutsamudu has two parallel main streets. The medina from the 15th century is located between them. The citadel was constructed in 1786 with help of the British to protect the city from Malagasy slave raisers. It was badly damaged in 1950 at the landfall of a cyclone.

Mutsamudu enjoys marine tropical weather. The main temperature range extends from 27°C to 32 °C (90 °F) throughout the year. The hottest period in Mutsamudu is from the month of December to the month of April. Comparatively cooler weather is experienced from the month of May to the month of November. There is significant rainfall in most months of the year, wettest month is January.

The entire Comoros islands are regularly swept by violent winds and sometimes by tropical cyclones with significant human and material damage. The most important of tropic cyclones recorded in Comoros occurred in 1950 and damaged the Mutsamudu citadel. Cyclone Elinah in 1983 and Cyclone Feliksa killed a few people but affected thousands of people's lives.

== Economy ==
Mutsamudu is the only deep water port of the Union of the Comoros, constructed in 1982. Three quarters of its cargo consists of transhipment for containerized cargoes destined to the two other islands. The main import products shipped from the port are rice, cement, sugar, flour and petroleum products. Main export products are ylang ylang, cloves and vanilla.
