= List of Comorians =

This is a list of notable people from, or connected to, the Comoros.

== Academics and scientists ==
- Damir Ben Ali, first president of the University of the Comoros

== Athletes and people in sports ==
- Jimmy Abdou, professional footballer currently playing for Millwall F.C & the Comoros national football team
- Kassim Ahamada, professional footballer
- Youssouf M'Changama, professional footballer currently playing for En Avant Guingamp
- El Fardou Ben, professional football player
- Toifilou Maoulida, professional footballer
- Waleed Al-Hammadi, professional footballer
- Nasser Mahmoud Noor, professional footballer
- Feta Ahamada, professional track and field sprint athlete
- Amed Elna, Olympic field athlete
- Fadane Hamadi, Olympic field athlete
- Denika Kassim, Olympic track and sprint athlete
- Hassanati Halifa, captain of the Comoros women's national football team in 2014
- Zaharouna Haoudadji, professional footballer
- Assimina Maoulida, professional footballer
- Ayouba Ali Sihame, Olympic swimmer
- Kanizat Ibrahim, business manager and football administrator

== Authors and writers ==
- Hayatte Abdou, investigative journalist and founder of the National Magazine
- Coralie Frei, nurse and first published woman writer from the Comoros
- Touhfat Mouhtare, second published woman writer from the Comoros
- Faïza Soulé Youssouf, journalist, novelist, and union president
- Ali Zamir, novelist and winner of the Prix Senghor in 2016

== Politicians and people in government ==
- Ahmed Abdallah Sambi, President of Comoros
- Azali Assoumani, former President of Comoros
- Djoumbé Fatima, sultan of Mwali from 1842 to 1865 and 1874 to 1878
- Salima Machamba, sultan of Mwali from 1888 to 1909
- Djoueria Abdallah, politician and midwife from Mitsamiouli village
- Hadjira Oumouri, politician and midwife
- Rashid Mohamed Mbaraka Fatma, politician and doctor
- Sittou Raghadat Mohamed, politician and first women minister in the Comoros
- Roubani Kaambi, ambassador
- Mohamed Toihiri, ambassador and first published novelist from the Comoros

== Visual and performance artists ==
- Hachimiya Ahamada, film director
- Zaïnaba Ahmed, traditional Comorian singer and women's rights advocate
- Lubaina Himid, painter and academic
- Nawal, singer-songwriter, musician
- Rohff, French rapper born In the Union of the Comoros, who lives in Vitry-sur-Seine
- Chamsia Sagaf, singer in Swahili
- Naïma, singer in the Zouk music genre

== Other notable people ==
- Hayatte Abdou, investigative journalist
- Ayouba Iliassa, professional seaman deck officer (2nd Off)
- Ibrahim Ali, teenaged murder victim in France
- Fazul Abdullah Mohammed, Comorian-Kenyan member of al-Qaeda

== See also ==
- List of Comorian politicians
- List of sultans in the Comoros
- List of heads of state of the Comoros
