= Loub Yacout Zaïdou =

Comorian midwife, administrator and politician

Minister for Health, Solidarity, Social Protection and Gender Promotion, Comoros
- Incumbent
- Assumed office 22 June 2019
- President: Azali Assoumani
- Preceded by: Rashid Mohamed Mbaraka Fatma

Personal details
- Born: 1961 (?)
- Education: Medicine School of Tunis DTS^{[fr]}

Loub Yakout Zaïdou is a Comorian midwife, administrator and politician serving as the current Minister for Health, Solidarity, Social Protection and Gender Promotion.

== Biography ==
Born as Loub Yacout Attoumane in Ouani on the island of Anjouan, she graduated from the Mutsamudu lycée in 1979. She obtained a higher technical diploma in obstetrics in 1983 from the Medicine School of Tunis and worked as a midwife at the Hombo state hospital from 1984 to 1987. Between 1987 and 1990 she studied in Senegal, obtaining another higher technical diploma in nursing. Upon returning to the Comoros, Zaïdou undertook roles in health education and family planning. From 1997 to 1999 she attended the National School of Administration (ÉNA) of Côte d'Ivoire, completing studies in health management. From 2000, Zaïdou has taken various leadership roles in the regional health system of Anjouan and worked on projects tackling tuberculosis, HIV and malaria. In March 2009, she was appointed program planning and NGO coordination officer at the Ministry of Health. In June 2019, when appointed Minister for Health, Solidarity, Social Protection and Gender Promotion, she indicated she wished to reorganise the Ministry and work to end violence against women and children.

Zaïdou is married to a medical doctor and has three daughters. She has been active in the Association of Comorian Midwives.
