= Touhfat Mouhtare =

Comorian writer

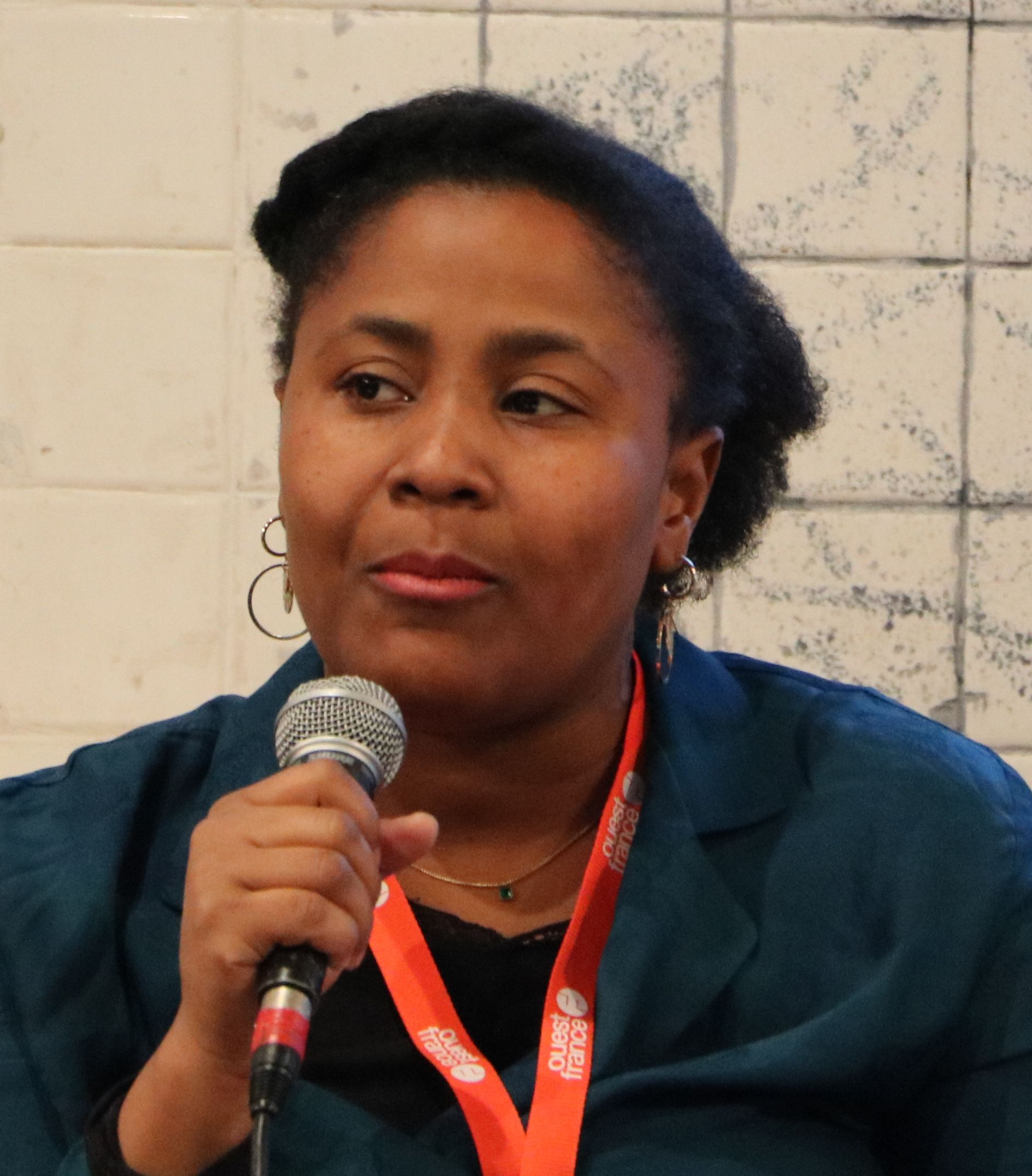

Touhfat Mouhtare is a Comorian writer, and the second published women writer from Comoros.

== Early life and education ==
Mouhtare was born 1986 in Moroni, Comoros. She has lived in various countries in Africa, and studied in France, where she received a master's degree in communications from the University of Paris.

== Career ==
She is the second published Comorian woman prose writer, after Coralie Frei, and has also published poetry. Âmes suspendues, a collection of novellas, was published in 2011. Her first novel, Vert cru, was published in 2018. Her writings evolve around mythology, transgenerational memory, psychology, spirituality, and humanism.

== Personal life ==
As of 2022, she lived in Paris.

== Bibliography ==
- Âmes suspendues (coelacanthe, 2011)
- Vert cru (KomEdit, 2018)
- Le feu du milieu (Le bruit du monde, 2022). The Fire Within, trans. Rachael McGill (Dedalus Books, 2025)

== Awards and honours ==
- 2018: Mention spéciale du prix du Livre insulaire au salon d’Ouessant for Vert cru
- 2022: Prix Alain Spiess du deuxième roman for Le feu du milieu
