= List of ambassadors of the Comoros to the United States =

Coordinates: 40.752752°N 73.966398°W

Ambassador of Comoros to the United States
- Incumbent; Mohamed Soilihi Soilih since November 18, 2014
- Inaugural holder: Ali Mlahaili
- Formation: November 22, 1982

The Comorian Ambassador to the United States is the official representative of the Government of the Comores to the Government of the United States.

== List of representatives ==
Agreement approved	Diplomatic accreditation	Ambassador	Observations	List of heads of state of the Comoros	List of presidents of the United States	Term end
August 15, 1977			Diplomatic Relations established with Comoros	Ali Soilih	Jimmy Carter	
November 19, 1982	November 22, 1982	Ali Mlahaili		Ahmed Abdallah	Ronald Reagan	
April 9, 1987	May 11, 1987	Amini Ali Moumin		Ahmed Abdallah	Ronald Reagan	
November 7, 1997	November 12, 1997	Ahmed Djabir		Mohamed Taki Abdoulkarim	Bill Clinton	
September 6, 2007	September 18, 2007	Mohamed Toihiri		Ahmed Abdallah Mohamed Sambi	George W. Bush	
September 6, 2012	September 19, 2012	Roubani Kaambi		Ikililou Dhoinine	Barack Obama	
November 13, 2014	November 18, 2014	Mohamed Soilihi Soilih		Ikililou Dhoinine	Barack Obama	
