= Siti Kassim =

Comorian minister (born 1961)

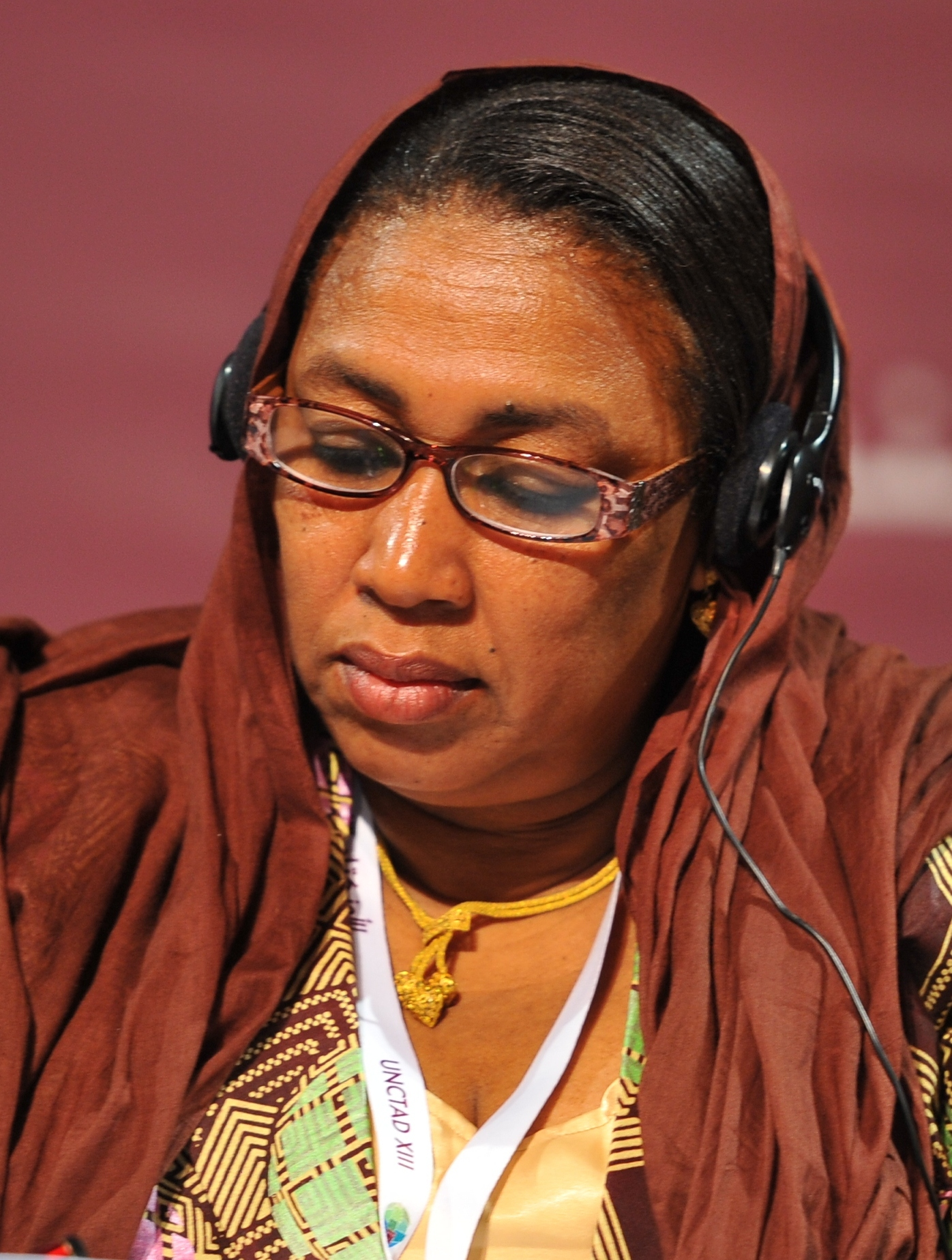
- Kassim in 2012
- Born: 5 August 1961 (age 64); Mbatsé, Comoros
- Known for: Minister of Employment, Labour, Vocational Training, Women's Entrepreneurship

Siti Kassim (born 5 August 1961) is a Comorian politician.

== Life ==
Kassam was born in Mbatsé in Comoros. After graduating from Fomboni high school in 1980, she continued her studies at the University of the Comoros, where she obtained a graduate degree in teaching at rural colleges in 1988.

== Career ==
She began her career as a teacher of history and geography at rural colleges in Moheli from 1988 to 1999.

After that, she was a coordinator for the nongovernmental organization Dia from 1999 to 2002.

She participated in the Multiannual Programme for Micro-Realization from 2002 to 2006, as part of the eighth European Development Fund, as a regional director. She was president of the network of African women ministers and parliamentarians of Comoros from 2008 to 2010.

Her political career began 27 May 2006, when she was given the post of Minister of Agriculture, Fisheries and Environment, a position she held until 11 July 2008. She was then appointed Secretary of State for Solidarity and gender promotion and general commissioner.

She has been Minister of Employment, Labour, Vocational Training, Women's Entrepreneurship and Spokesperson of the Government since 31 May 2011. She retains her position as minister.
