= Ouani =

- Location of Ouani on the island of Anjouan
- Coordinates: 12°08′06″S 44°25′39″E
- Country: Comoros
- Island: Anjouan
- Prefecture: Ouani

Area
  - Total: 24.2 km^{2} (9.3 sq mi)

Population (2017)
  - Total: 22,501
  - Density: 930/km^{2} (2,410/sq mi)
- Time zone: UTC+3 (Eastern Africa Time)

Ouani is a town with a population of over 22,000 people. It is located on the island of Anjouan in the Comoros and is the birthplace of writer Coralie Frei and politician Loub Yacout Zaïdou.
