= Hayatte Abdou =

Comorian journalist

- Born: Moroni, Comoros Island
- Education: University of the Comoros
- Occupation: Journalist

Hayatte Abdou is a Comorian investigative journalist. She is the founder and editor-in-chief of National Magazine.

== Biography ==
Abdou is an investigative journalist from Moroni, Comoros Island. She was educated at the University of the Comoros.

Abdou is the founder and editor-in-chief of National Magazine. Her work has included stories on malaria and the military health laboratory giving false positive test results, the corruption of the Comorian tax administration authority AGID, and investigating the death of the first president of the National Union of Journalists in the Comoros.
