= Faïza Soulé Youssouf =

Comorian journalist and novelist

- Born: 1985 (age 40–41); Moroni, Comoros
- Occupations: journalist, novelist
- Employer(s): Union de la presse francophone, Al-Watwan
- Notable work: Ghizza, à tombeau ouvert

Faïza Soulé Youssouf (born 1985) is a Comorian journalist and novelist. Her novel Ghizza, à tombeau ouvert was published in 2015.

Youssouf is a native of Moroni. She has served as the president of the Comorian branch of the Union de la presse francophone,

== Election ==
She has served as the editor-in-chief of Al-Watwan, receiving 14 out of 19 votes.

== Awards ==
She received The Culturelab grant awards for her writing as well.
