= Mohamed Toihiri =

Comorian novelist and diplomat

H.E. Mohamed Toihiri
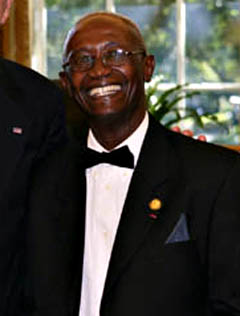

Permanent Representative to the UN for Comoros
- In office October 2007 – October 2012
- Succeeded by: Roubani Kaambi

Personal details
- Born: 20 August 1955 (age 70)

Mohamed Toihiri (born 20 August 1955) was the Permanent Representative to the United Nations for Comoros, (also accredited as ambassador to the United States, Canada and Cuba) between 2007 and 2012. Outside of his ambassadorship, Toihiri is known as Comoros's first published novelist.

== Education ==
Toihiri attended the University of Bordeaux III, France from 1977 to 1979. Toihiri first received two undergraduate degrees in French and Communications in 1977 and 1978, respectively. After receiving his degrees, he completed a graduate degree in Communications, and a Ph.D. in modern French literature with a concentration in Francophone literature in 1979.

== Career ==
Toihiri had previously worked primarily in the media and academics. He became the director of culture for Radio Comoros in 1978. During his career, he frequently participated in newspapers of Comoros by serving as editor in chief for Le Comorian, and writing articles for Kashkazi and Al-Watwan.

Tolihiri started his academic career in 1978, and held multiple positions. A few of his positions include Academic Director and general director for Comoros. During his career in education, Toihiri briefly worked in Paris as director for public relations for Sony and TDK from 1986 to 1988. Before being appointed to the UN, he held the chair for French literature as senior lecturer in the University of the Comoros.

== United Nations ==
On 1 October 2007, Toihiri was named the Permanent Representative to the United Nations for Comoros.

== Literature ==
In 1985, Toihiri wrote a satirical novel about Ali Soilih's government called Republique des Imberbes Roman Comorien. His second novel was Le Kafir du Karthala (1995).
