= Chamsia Sagaf =

Comoros singer (born 1955)

- Born: 1955 (age 70–71); Mitsamiouli
- Known for: Singing

Chamsia Sagaf (born 1955) is a Comoros singer who sings in Shingazidja.

== Life ==
Sagaf was born in the Comoros to wealthy parents in the town of Mitsamiouli. She is known for singing about women and children. She first sang in women's associations in the 1970s and has created three albums. She has lived in France since 1975.

In 2003, she was nominated for the trophy for best singer in East Africa. She had toured with the Ivorian singer Monique Séka after a performance together in Paris. She is creditted with making a significant contribution to the music of the Comorres. She was performing in the Caribbean in 2008.

== Private life ==
She is married and has five children, one of whom is the Comoros singer Naima.
