= Rashid Mohamed Mbaraka Fatma =

Female doctor and minister of Comores

- Alma mater: Université Félix Houphouët-Boigny
- Occupation: Politician, medical doctor
- Position held: Minister of Health of the Comoros (2017–2019)

Rashid Mohamed Mbaraka Fatma is a Comorian doctor and politician, who was appointed Minister of Health, Solidarity, Social Protection and Gender Promotion from 2017 to 2019 in the government of Azali Assoumani.

== Biography ==
Fatma obtained a doctorate in medicine from the University of Cocody in 1989. She was the second woman to achieve this. She then worked as a pediatrician from 1989 to 2000, then as an emergency doctor from 2000 to 2017 at the El-Maarouf National Hospital Center in Moroni. She was appointed Minister of Health, Solidarity, Social Protection and Gender Promotion by Azali Assoumani in 2017. During her ministry, she was the only woman in the cabinet.

While minister, Comoros received $1.6 million from Japan to treat children's malnutrition. She also launched a malaris elimination program, funded by China. She also spoke out on the importance of family planning for development. In March 2019 she was flagbearer for Comoros and Africa at the 62nd session of the UN Commission on the Status of Women (CSW62). She was replaced as minister by Loub Yacout Zaïdou in June 2019.
