= Roubani Kaambi =

Comorian diplomat and ambassador

H.E. Roubani Kaambi

Permanent Representative to the UN for Comoros
- Incumbent
- Assumed office October 2012
- Preceded by: Mohamed Toihiri

Roubani Kaambi is the current permanent representative of the Comoros to the United Nations. He is also the ambassador to Canada, Cuba and the United States. Kaambi is the current diplomatic high steward of EUCLID (Euclid University).

== Education and career ==
He was before the communications adviser to the president of the Union of the Comoros between 2004 and 2006. From 2003 to 2004, he was the government’s adviser on relations with ministerial secretaries general. In 1994, Kaambi was chief of staff to the prime minister, secretary general of the government, and president of the Support Commission for Institutional Reform in Public Administration.

He has also served as Minister for Justice and Government spokesman in 1993, with additional responsibilities for labour and employment, and relations with the parliament, among other duties.

Kaambi was also a professor of law at the University of the Comoros from 2006 to 2011.

Kaambi holds doctorates in public law, as well as in history, culture and societal organization from the University of Strasbourg, France, and is a graduate of the National School of Public Administration in Morocco.
