= Jimilimé =

Coordinates: 12°06′S 44°28′E

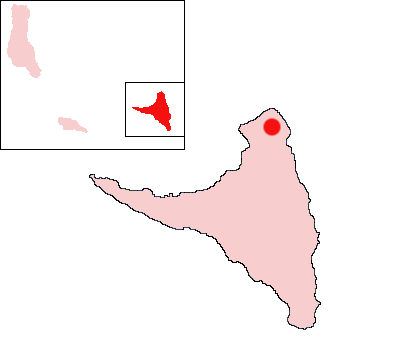
Location of Jimilimé on the island of Anjouan

Jimilimé is a large village located on the island of Anjouan in the Comoros.
