= Zaïnaba Ahmed =

Comorian singer

- Born: 1960 (age 65–66); Mitsamiouli, Grande Comore, Comoros
- Occupations: Singer; activist
- Instrument: Singing

Zaïnaba Ahmed (born 1960) is a Comorian singer. She is the first Comorian artist to sign with a foreign record label while remaining a resident of the islands.

== Early life ==
Ahmed was born in the town of Mitsamiouli, into a family of modest means with ten children. She began performing at weddings at the age of five.

== Career ==
A mother herself of five children, she has released three albums of traditional Comorian music; she has also been politically active as a campaigner for women's rights, and assisted in setting up a postal system for the islands. In addition to being a musician, she occupies a position within the Comorian government. Ahmed's music is informed by the traditional music of the archipelago. Her earlier recordings were made with synthesizers and other forms of electronic processing, but her more recent arrangements involve minimal accompaniment save for a women's chorus, percussion, and on one occasion a guitar. She is known as the voix d'or, or "golden voice", in her homeland, and has performed concerts abroad as well as at home. She also continues to perform at weddings.
