= Foumbouni =

Town in the Comoros

Coordinates: 11°52′S 43°29′E

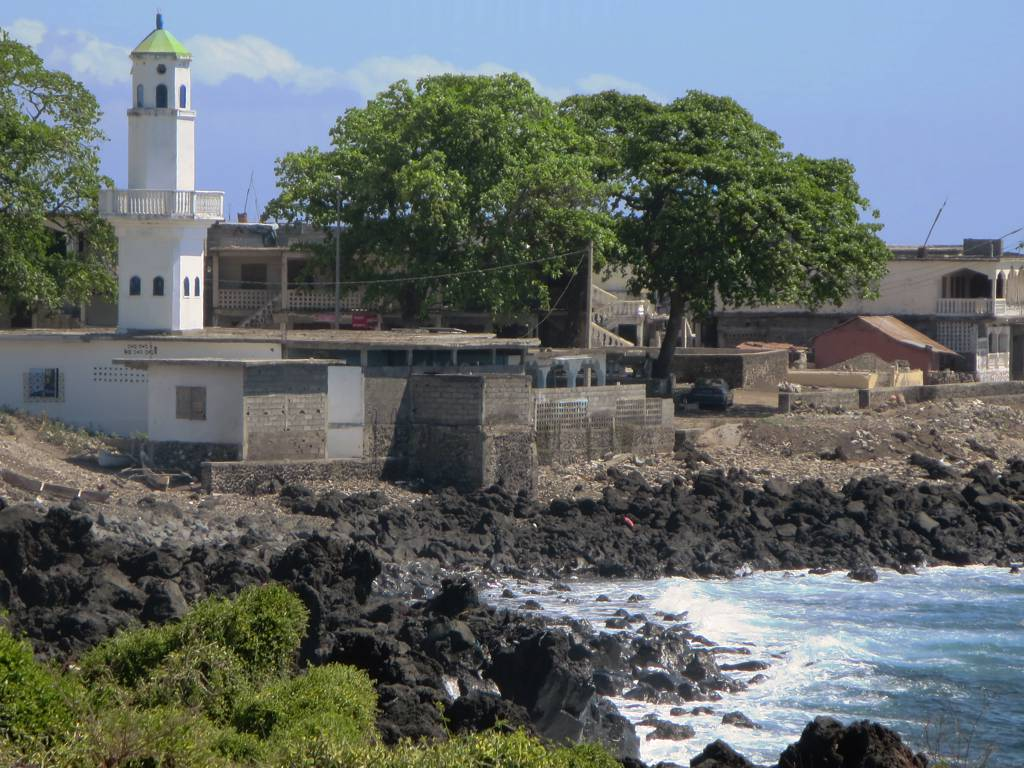
Foumbouni

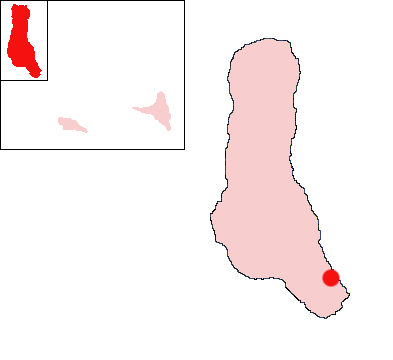
Location of Foumbouni on the island of Grande Comore

Foumbouni is a town located on the island of Grande Comore in the Comoros.
