= Al-Watwan =

French and Arabic language newspaper in Comoros

- Type: Daily
- Format: Broadsheet
- Founded: 1985; 40 years ago
- Language: French, Arabic
- Headquarters: Moroni
- City: Moroni
- Country: Comoros
- Website: http://www.alwatwan.net

Al-Watwan (Arabic: الوطن) is a Comorian daily newspaper published in French and Arabic, headquartered in Moroni, Comoros.

Faïza Soulé Youssouf was an editor-in-chief between June 2017 and May 2018.
