= Naïma (Comoros singer) =

Comoros singer

Naïma (born Naima Said Ibrahim) is a musical artist from the Comoro Islands. She sings to the Zouk fast jump-up carnival beat music genre.

== Career ==
Naima was born in the Comoros. She is a new generation Zouk singer, a various-yet-mainly-slow style beat originating from the Caribbean islands of Guadeloupe and Martinique, and popularized by the French Antillean band Kassav' in the 1980s.

Naima was first professionally signed with the SectionZouk recording label. Her first album was called Reviens, after which she released various singles, including an R&B tune entitled "In Your Dreams". Naima remained with SectionZouk until released in 2008 amid concerns the Zouk music genre was becoming unpopular. As a key figure in the Zouk genre, Naima's departure "raises[d] new questions about where the zouk industry is heading". She later claimed that one of her songs, Avec ou sans toi, from an earlier, unreleased album was leaked in Europe, Martinique, and French Guiana.

Naïma is the daughter of Comorian singer Chamsia Sagaf.
