= Coralie Frei =

Comorian nurse and writer

Coralie Frei (born October 12, 1951) is a Comorian nurse and writer currently living in Switzerland. She is the first Comorian woman to write a novel, and has also written poetry.

Born in Ouani, she began her studies in her native town before continuing them in Mutsamudu and at the Lycée Saïd Mohamed Cheik in Moroni. After obtaining a baccalaureat in philosophy in 1973, she married, but it did not last, and she travelled to France for further study and to seek a divorce. Frei continued her studies of English and Spanish, at the Universities of Toulouse and Pau, and remarried there. Upon receiving her degree in Pau, she chose instead to take a nurse's diploma. She raised five children during this time, and is a grandmother of 4 granddaughters and 5 grandsons. She has written throughout her life, producing poetry as well as fiction; she writes in both French and German. She has published six books and two CDs, and some of her poetry has been set to music.

== Works ==
Frei's works include:

- La perle des Comores
- L'autre côté de l'océan
- Le journal de Maya. Confidences d'un chat
