= Hassanati Halifa =

Comorian footballer

Personal information
- Date of birth: 1 March 1984 (age 42)
- Place of birth: Dzahadjou Hambou, Grande Comore, Comoros

International career
Years	Team	Apps	(Gls)
- Comoros

Managerial career
- 2020–: Comoros Under-17 (assistant)

Hassanati Halifa (born 1 March 1984) is a Comorian footballer and coach who captains the Comoros women's national team.

== International career ==
Halifa capped for the Comoros at senior level during the 2014 African Women's Championship qualification.

== Coaching career ==
Since 2020, Halifa has served as an assistant coach with the Comoros women's national under-17 football team.
