= University of the Comoros =

Public university in Mvouni, Comoros

Coordinates: 11°43′56″S 43°16′41″E

- Université des Comores
- Type: Public university
- Established: 2003; 23 years ago
- Affiliations: Agence universitaire de la Francophonie
- President: Dr. Said Bourhani Abdallah
- Students: Approx. 15,546 (in 2017)
- Location: Mvouni, Comoros
- Language: French
- Website: univ-comores.km

The University of the Comoros is a higher education institution located in Mvouni, near Moroni, the capital of the Comoros.

== History ==
In April 1998, Abdou Mhoumadi, then Minister of Education, signed the project for the University of the Comoros. Established in 2003 by the initiative of President Azali Assoumani, the university accommodates a large majority of High School graduates to have higher education from the Comoros who previously had to go abroad to continue their higher education.

The first president of the university was Doctor Damir Ben Ali. The establishment and setup of this institution were managed by a "Committee of Reflection, Action, and Monitoring for the establishment of the University of the Comoros" (CRASUC). This committee was supported by a panel of 10 experts with extensive university experience and possessing foreign qualifications.

In 2006, students from the Faculty of Law at the University of the Comoros founded the Ngoshawo Youth Association.

== Organization ==
The University of the Comoros comprises four faculties, one institute, and one school, located across four sites:

Mvouni Site

- Faculty of Law and Economic Sciences
- Faculty of Arts and Humanities

Karthala CUFOP Site

- Imam Chafiou Islamic & Social Sciences Faculty (Arabic Literature and Islamic Sciences)
- Center for Permanent Training (CUFOP)

Corniche Site

- Faculty of Science and Technology
- School of Medicine and Public Health (EMPS)

Hamramba Site

- Institute for Teacher Training and Educational Research (IFERE)
- University Institute of Technology, comprising the following departments:
  - Department of Electrical & Computer Engineering
  - Department of Civil & Mechanical Engineering
  - Department of Commerce
  - Department of Tourism and Hospitality
  - Department of Business Administration
  - Department of Statistics
  - Department of Habitat and Environment

== Notable people ==
- Roubani Kaambi
- Siti Kassim
- Sittou Raghadat Mohamed
- Mohamed Toihiri
