= Comoros =

African island country in the Indian Ocean

Union of the Comoros
(in official languages)
Arabic	جمهورية القمر المتحدة; Jumhuriyat al-Qumur al-Muttaḥida
French	Union des Comores
Ngazidja Comorian	Udzima wa Komori
- Flag Seal
- Motto: "Unité – Solidarité – Développement" (French); وحدة، تضامن، تنمية (Arabic); "Unity – Solidarity – Development"
- Anthem: Umodja wa Massiwa (Comorian); The Union of the Islands
- Location of the Comoros (circled)
- Capital and largest city: Moroni; 11.69°S 43.26°E
- Official languages: Comorian; French; Arabic
- Ethnic groups (2000): 97.1% Comorians; 1.6% Makua; 1.3% Others
- Religion (2025): 99.6% Islam (Official); 0.3% Christianity; 0.1% Other
- Demonyms: Comorian; Comorese
- Government: Unitary presidential republic
  - President: Azali Assoumani
  - President of the Assembly: Moustadroine Abdou
- Legislature: Assembly of the Union

Formation
  - Ngazidja, Ndzuwani, Mwali under French rule: 1886
  - Protectorate of the Comoros: 6 September 1887
  - Territory under French Madagascar: 9 April 1908
  - Overseas territory: 27 October 1946
  - State of Comoros: 22 December 1961
  - Independence from France: 6 July 1975
  - Federal Islamic Republic of Comoros: 1 October 1978
  - Union of the Comoros: 23 December 2001
  - Current constitution: 17 May 2009

Area
  - Total: 2,235 km^{2} (863 sq mi) (170th)
  - Water (%): negligible

Population
  - 2026 estimate: ▲944,388 (159th)
  - 2017 census: 758,316
  - Density: 457/km^{2} (1,183.6/sq mi) (27th)
- GDP (PPP): 2023 estimate
  - Total: ▲$3.432 billion
  - Per capita: ▲$3,463
- GDP (nominal): 2023 estimate
  - Total: ▲$1.364 billion
  - Per capita: ▲$1,377
- Gini (2024): ▼30.3 medium inequality
- HDI (2023): ▲0.603 medium (152nd)
- Currency: Comorian franc (KMF)
- Time zone: UTC+3 (EAT)
- Calling code: +269
- ISO 3166 code: KM
- Internet TLD: .km

The Comoros, (Note: /ˈkɒməroʊz/ KOM-ə-rohz; Comorian: Komori, pronounced [ko.mo.ri]; Arabic: جزر القمر, romanized: Juzur al-Qumur / Qamar; French: Comores) officially the Union of the Comoros, (Note: French: Union des Comores; Arabic: جمهورية القمر المتحدة, romanized: Jumhuriyat al-Qumur al-Muttaḥida; Comorian: Udzima wa Komori) is an archipelagic country made up of three islands in Southeast Africa, located at the northern end of the Mozambique Channel in the Indian Ocean. Its capital and largest city is Moroni. The predominant religion of the population—and the official state religion—is Islam. Comoros proclaimed its independence from France on 6 July 1975. The three official languages are Comorian, French and Arabic. The Comoros is the only country of the Arab League which is entirely in the Southern Hemisphere. It is a member state of the African Union (AU), the Organisation internationale de la Francophonie, the Organisation of Islamic Cooperation, and the Indian Ocean Commission.

At 1,659 square kilometres (641 sq mi), it is the third-smallest African country by area after São Tomé and Príncipe and Seychelles. With a population of 944,388, it ranks as one of the most densely populated countries in the world. The sovereign state consists of three major islands, namely Grande Comore, Anjouan, and Mohéli, and numerous smaller islands, all of the volcanic Comoro Islands with the exception of Mayotte. Mayotte voted against independence from France in a referendum in 1974 and continues to be administered by France as an overseas department. France has repeatedly vetoed United Nations Security Council resolutions that would have affirmed Comorian sovereignty over the island. Mayotte became the overseas department and a region of France in 2011 following a referendum which was passed overwhelmingly. However, the Comoros continues to claim the island, with backing from the AU and UN.

The Comoros were likely first settled by Austronesian-speaking Malagasy peoples, Bantu speakers from East Africa, and seafaring Arab traders. From 1500 the Sultanate of Anjouan dominated the islands, with Grande Comore split between several sultans. It became part of the French colonial empire during the 19th century, before its independence in 1975. It has experienced more than 20 coups or attempted coups, with various heads of state assassinated. Along with this political instability, it ranks in the bottom quartile on the Human Development Index. In 2023, the Comoros had the least income inequality among its peers regionally, though poverty remains widespread especially in rural areas. Between 2009 and 2014, about 19% of the population lived below the international poverty line of US $1.90 per day by purchasing power parity.

== Etymology ==
The name "Comoros" derives from the Arabic Jazr al-Qumr (Arabic: جزر القمر), "Islands of the Moon". Alfred Gevrey, a colonial judge who worked in Mayotte wrote in Essai sur les Comores (1870) proposing that Qumr may have referred to a general southern region where Arab sailors would have observed the bright Magellanic Clouds (as elaborated by Yaqut al-Hamawi from inquiries with Zanj peoples), later fixed to the entire Mozambique Channel.

== History ==
=== Settlement ===
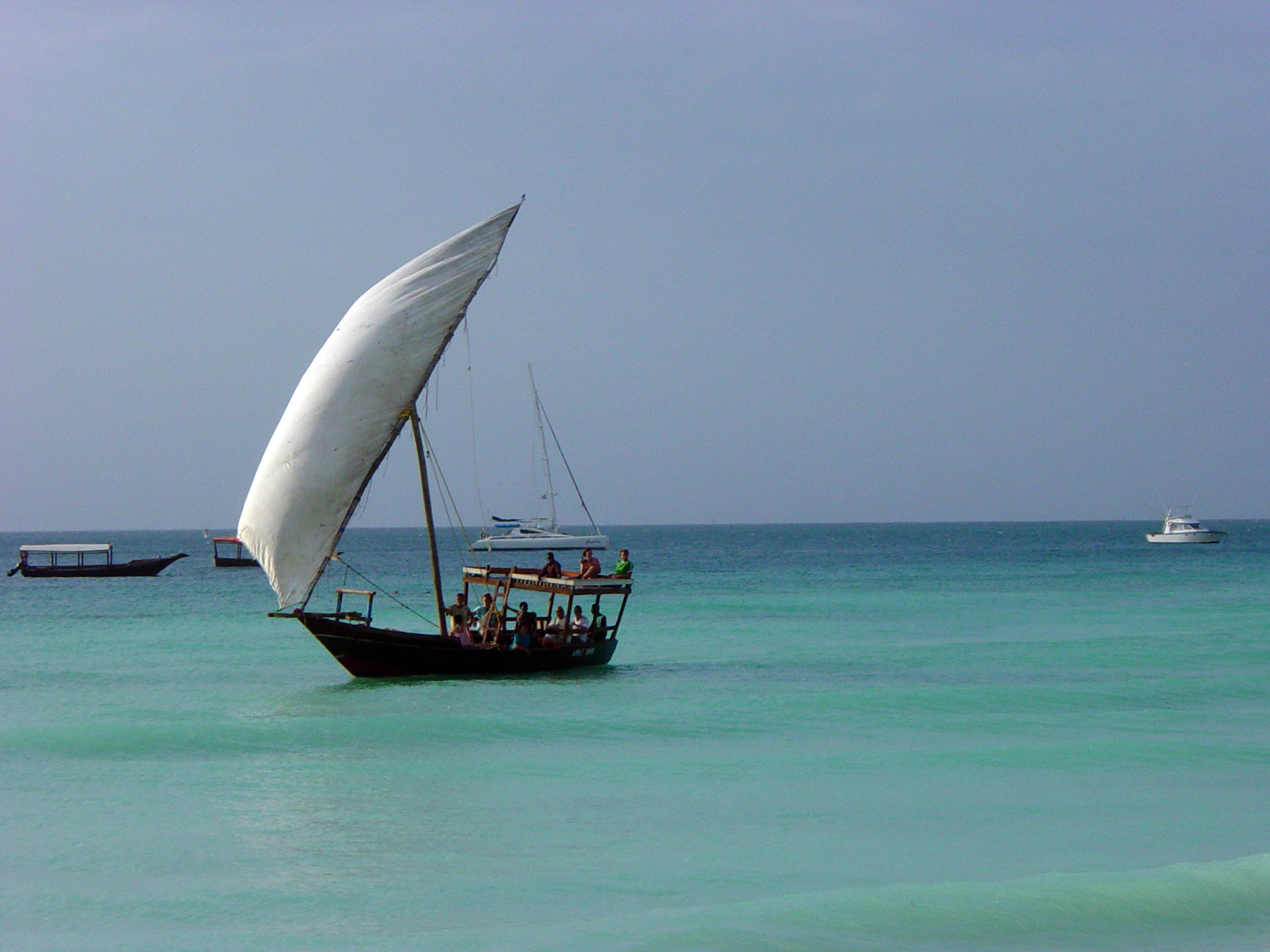
A large dhow with lateen sail rigs

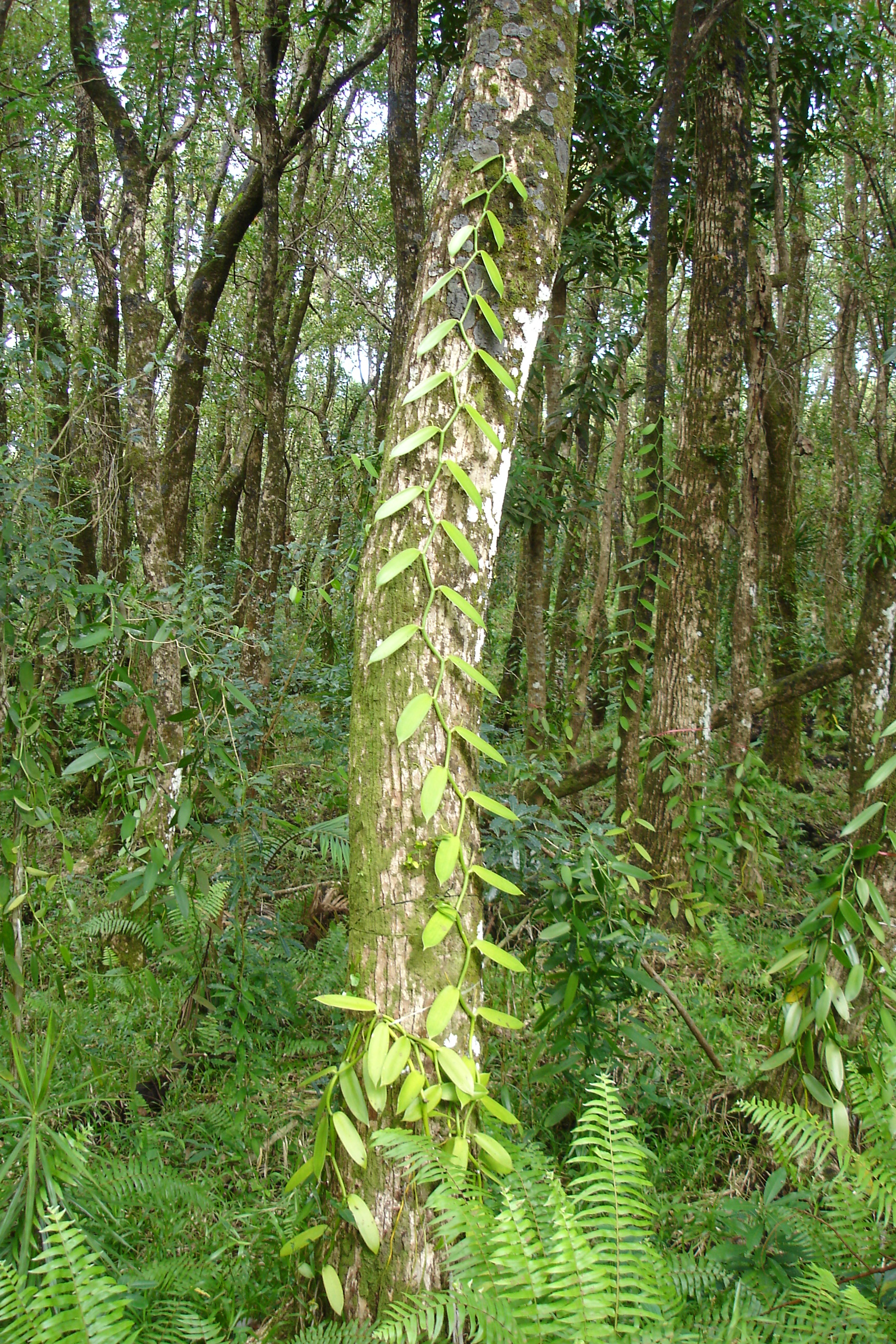
A vanilla plantation

According to mythology, a jinni dropped a jewel, which formed a great circular inferno. This became the Karthala volcano, which created the island of Ngazidja (Grande Comore). King Solomon is said to have visited the island accompanied by his queen Bilqis.

The first attested human inhabitants of the Comoro Islands are now thought to have been Austronesian settlers travelling by boat from islands in Southeast Asia. These people arrived in the area no later than the 8th century AD, the date of the earliest known archaeological site, found on Mayotte, although settlement beginning in the first century has been postulated. Subsequent settlers came from the east coast of Africa, the Arabian Peninsula and the Persian Gulf, the Malay Archipelago, and Madagascar. Bantu-speaking settlers were present on the islands from the beginnings of settlement.

Development of the Comoros is divided into phases. The earliest reliably recorded phase is the Dembeni phase (8th to 10th centuries), during which there were several small settlements on each island. From the 11th to the 15th centuries, trade with Madagascar and merchants from the Swahili coast and the Middle East flourished, more villages were founded, and existing villages grew. Settlers from the Arabian Peninsula, particularly Hadhramaut, arrived during this period.

=== Middle Ages and European contact ===
According to legend, in 632, upon hearing of Islam, islanders are said to have dispatched an emissary, Mtswa-Mwindza, to Mecca—but by the time he arrived there, the Islamic prophet Muhammad had died. Nonetheless, after a stay in Mecca, he returned to Ngazidja where he built a mosque in his home town of Ntsaweni and led the gradual conversion of the islanders to Islam.

In 933, the Comoros was referred to by Omani sailors as the Perfume Islands. Among the earliest accounts of East Africa, the works of Al-Masudi describe early Islamic trade routes and how the coast and islands were frequently visited by Muslims including Persian and Arab merchants and sailors in search of coral, ambergris, ivory, tortoiseshell, gold, and slaves for the Arabic slave trade. They also brought Islam to the people of the Zanj including the Comoros. As the importance of the Comoros grew along the East African coast, mosques were constructed. The Comoros are part of the Swahili cultural and economic complex, and the islands became a major hub of trade and an important location in a network of trading towns that included Kilwa, in present-day Tanzania, Sofala (an outlet for Zimbabwean gold), in Mozambique, and Mombasa in Kenya.

The Portuguese arrived in the Indian Ocean at the end of the 15th century, and the first Portuguese visit to the islands seems to have been that of Vasco da Gama's second fleet in 1503. For much of the 16th century, the islands provided provisions to the Portuguese fort at Mozambique, and although there was no formal attempt by the Portuguese crown to take possession, some Portuguese traders settled and married local women.

By the end of the 16th century, local rulers on the African mainland were beginning to push back and, with the support of the Omani Sultan Saif bin Sultan, they began to defeat the Dutch and the Portuguese. One of his successors, Said bin Sultan, increased Omani Arab influence in the region, moving his administration to nearby Zanzibar, which came under Omani rule. Nevertheless, the Comoros remained independent, and although the three smaller islands were usually politically unified, the largest island, Ngazidja, was divided into autonomous kingdoms (ntsi).

The islands were well placed to meet the needs of Europeans, initially supplying the Portuguese in Mozambique, then ships, particularly the English, on the route to India, and, later, slaves to the plantation islands in the Mascarenes.

=== French colonisation ===
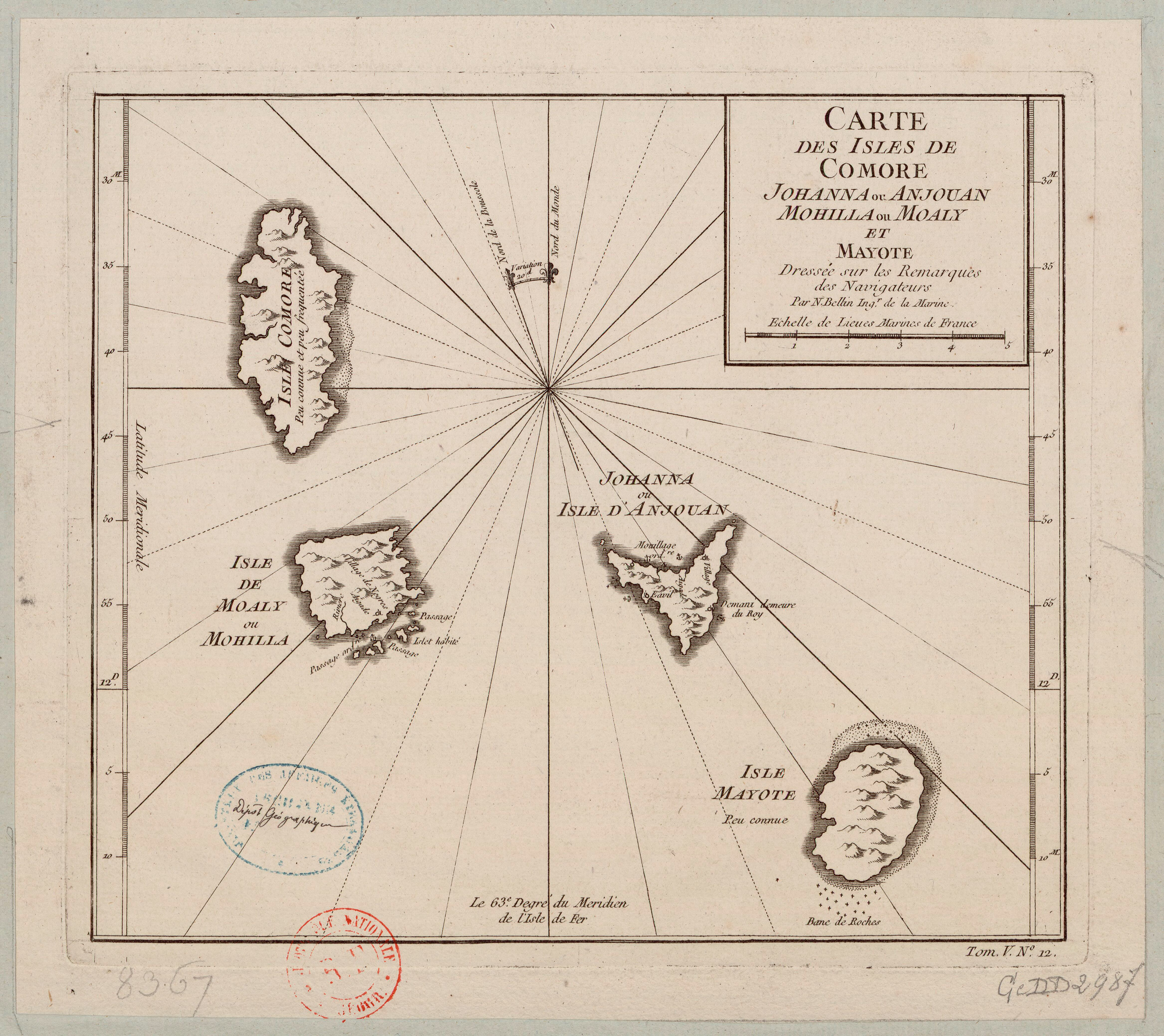
French map of the Comores, 1747

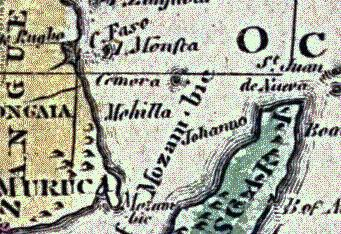
An 1808 map refers to the islands as "Camora".

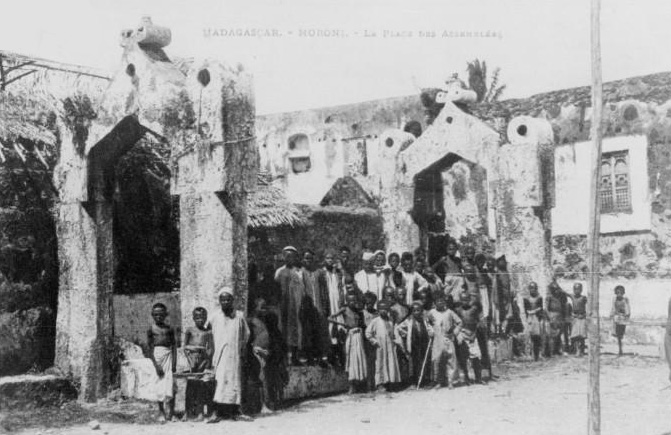
A public square, Moroni, 1908

In the 1790s Malagasy warriors, mostly Betsimisaraka and Sakalava, started raiding the Comoros for slaves, and the islands were devastated as crops were destroyed. The people slaughtered, taken into captivity, or fled to the African mainland: it is said that by the time the raids finally ended in the 1810s only one man remained on Mwali. The islands were repopulated by slaves from the mainland, who were traded to the French in Mayotte and the Mascarenes. On the Comoros, it was estimated in 1865 that as much as 40% of the population consisted of slaves.

France first established colonial rule by taking possession of Mayotte in 1841 when the Sakalava usurper sultan Andriantsoly (also known as Tsy Levalo) signed the Treaty of April 1841, which ceded the island to the French authorities. After its annexation, France attempted to convert Mayotte into a sugar plantation colony.

Meanwhile, Ndzwani (or Johanna as it was known to the British) continued to serve as a way station for English merchants sailing to India and the Far East, as well as American whalers, although the British gradually abandoned it following their possession of Mauritius in 1814, and by the time the Suez Canal opened in 1869 there was no longer any significant supply trade at Ndzwani. Local commodities exported by the Comoros were (in addition to slaves) coconuts, timber, cattle, and tortoiseshell. British and American settlers, as well as the island's sultan, established a plantation-based economy that used about one-third of the land for export crops. In addition to sugar on Mayotte, ylang-ylang and other perfume plants, vanilla, cloves, coffee, cocoa beans, and sisal were introduced.

In 1886, Mwali was placed under French protection by Sultan Mardjani Abdou Cheikh. That same year, Sultan Said Ali of Bambao, one of the sultanates on Ngazidja, placed the island under French protection in exchange for French support of his claim to the entire island, which he retained until his abdication in 1910. In 1908 the four islands were unified under a single administration (Colonie de Mayotte et dépendances) and placed under the authority of the French colonial Governor-General of Madagascar. In 1909, Sultan Said Muhamed of Ndzwani abdicated in favour of French rule, and in 1912 the protectorates were abolished and the islands administered as a single colony. Two years later the colony was abolished, and the islands became a province of the colony of Madagascar.

An agreement was reached with France in 1973 for the Comoros to become independent in 1978, despite the deputies of Mayotte voting for increased integration with France. A referendum was held on all four of the islands. Three voted for independence by large margins, while Mayotte voted against. On 6 July 1975, however, the Comorian parliament passed a unilateral resolution declaring independence. Ahmed Abdallah proclaimed the independence of the Comorian State (État comorien; دولة القمر) and became its first president. France did not recognise the state until 31 December and retained control of Mayotte.

=== Independence to present ===
Flag of the Comoros (1963–1975)

Flag of the Comoros (1975–1978)

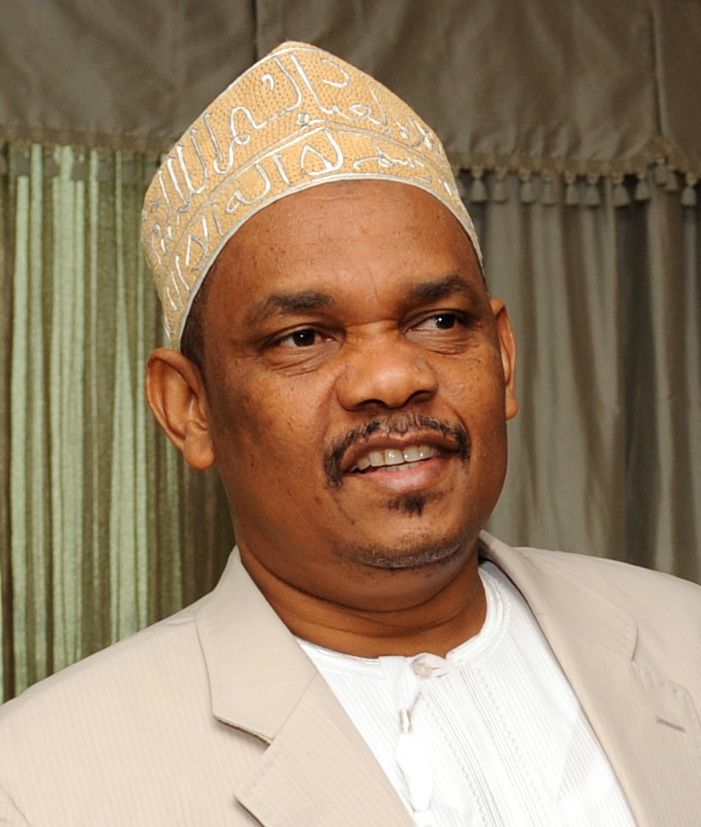
Ikililou Dhoinine, President of the Comoros from 2011 to 2016

The next 30 years were filled with political turmoil. On 3 August 1975, less than one month after independence, Abdallah was removed from office in an armed coup and replaced with United National Front of the Comoros (FNUK) member Said Mohamed Jaffar. In January 1976 Jaffar was ousted in favour of his Minister of Defence Ali Soilih.

The population of Mayotte voted against independence from France in three referendums during this period. The first, held on all the islands on 22 December 1974, won 63.8% support for maintaining ties with France on Mayotte; the second, held in February 1976, confirmed that vote with an overwhelming 99.4%, while the third, in April 1976, confirmed that the people of Mayotte wished to remain a French territory. The three remaining islands, ruled by Soilih, instituted socialist and isolationist policies that strained relations with France. On 13 May 1978, Bob Denard, commissioned by the French intelligence service (SDECE), returned to overthrow Soilih and reinstate Abdallah with the support of the French, Rhodesian and South African governments. Soilih was captured and executed a few weeks later.

In contrast to Soilih, Abdallah's presidency was marked by authoritarian rule and increased adherence to traditional Islam and the country was renamed the Federal Islamic Republic of the Comoros (République Fédérale Islamique des Comores; جمهورية القمر الإتحادية الإسلامية). Denard served as Abdallah's first advisor; nicknamed the "Viceroy of the Comoros", he was considered the strongman of the regime. Very close to South Africa, which financed his "presidential guard", he allowed Paris to circumvent the international embargo on the apartheid regime via Moroni. He also set up from the archipelago a permanent mercenary corps, called upon to intervene at the request of Paris or Pretoria in conflicts in Africa. Abdallah continued as president until 1989, when, fearing a probable coup, he signed a decree ordering the Presidential Guard, led by Denard, to disarm the armed forces. Shortly after the signing of the decree, Abdallah was allegedly shot dead in his office by a disgruntled military officer, though sources claimed an antitank missile was launched into his bedroom and killed him.. Denard was also injured; it is suspected that Abdallah's killer was a soldier under his command.

A few days later, Denard was evacuated to South Africa by French paratroopers. Said Mohamed Djohar, Soilih's older half-brother, then became president and served until September 1995, when Denard returned and attempted another coup. This time, France intervened with paratroopers and forced Denard to surrender. The French removed Djohar to Réunion, and Paris-backed Mohamed Taki Abdoulkarim became president by election. He led the country from 1996, during a time of labour crises, government suppression, and secessionist conflicts, until his death in November 1998. He was succeeded by interim President Tadjidine Ben Said Massounde.

The islands of Ndzwani and Mwali declared their independence from the Comoros in 1997, in an attempt to restore French rule. But France rejected their request, leading to bloody confrontations between federal troops and rebels. In April 1999, Colonel Azali Assoumani, Army Chief of Staff, seized power in a bloodless coup, overthrowing Massounde, citing weak leadership in the face of the crisis. This was the Comoros' 18th coup or attempted coup since independence in 1975.

Assoumani failed to consolidate power and reestablish control over the islands, which was the subject of international criticism. The African Union, under the auspices of President Thabo Mbeki of South Africa, imposed sanctions on Ndzwani to help broker negotiations and effect reconciliation. Under the terms of the Fomboni Accords, signed in December 2001 by the leaders of all three islands, the official name was changed to the Union of the Comoros; the country was to be highly decentralised, and the central union government would devolve most powers to the new island governments, each led by a president. The Union president, although elected by national elections, would be chosen in rotation from each of the islands every five years.

Assoumani stepped down in 2002 to run in the democratic election of the president, which he won. Under ongoing international pressure, as a military ruler who had originally come to power by force, and was not always democratic while in office, Assoumani led the Comoros through constitutional changes that enabled new elections. A Loi des compétences law was passed in early 2005 that defines the responsibilities of each governmental body, and is in the process of implementation. The elections in 2006 were won by Ahmed Abdallah Mohamed Sambi, a Sunni Muslim cleric nicknamed the "Ayatollah" for his time spent studying Islam in Iran. Assoumani honoured the election results, thus allowing the first peaceful and democratic exchange of power.

Colonel Mohamed Bacar, a French-trained former gendarme elected president of Ndzwani in 2001, refused to step down at the end of his five-year mandate. He staged a vote in June 2007 to confirm his leadership that was rejected as illegal by the Comoros federal government and the African Union. On 25 March 2008, hundreds of soldiers from the African Union and the Comoros seized rebel-held Ndzwani, generally welcomed by the population: there were reports of hundreds to thousands of people tortured during Bacar's tenure. Some rebels were killed and injured. At least 11 civilians were wounded. Some officials were imprisoned. Bacar fled in a speedboat to Mayotte to seek asylum. Anti-French protests followed in the Comoros. Bacar was eventually granted asylum in Benin.

Former Vice-president Ikililou Dhoinine was inaugurated as president in 2011. Dhoinine was the first president of the Comoros from Mwali. Following the 2016 elections, Azali Assoumani from Ngazidja became president for a third term. In 2018, Assoumani held a referendum on constitutional reform that would permit a president to serve two terms. The amendments were passed, although the vote was widely contested and boycotted by the opposition, and in April 2019, to widespread opposition, Assoumani was re-elected president to serve the first of potentially two five-year terms. The 2020 legislative elections were dominated by Assoumani's party, the Convention for the Renewal of the Comoros (CRC). It took an overwhelming majority in the parliament.

In 2021, Comoros signed and ratified the Treaty on the Prohibition of Nuclear Weapons, making it a nuclear-weapon-free state. and in 2023, Comoros was invited as a non-member guest to the G7 summit in Hiroshima. On 18 February 2023 the Comoros assumed the presidency of the African Union. Assoumani was re-elected with 63% of the vote in the disputed 2024 presidential election. CRC won the 2025 parliamentary election, taking 28 out of 33 parliamentary seats. The opposition parties rejected the results. In 2026, the Historic Sultanates of the Comoro Islands were inscribed as a UNESCO World Heritage Site, making them the first Islamic sites to be listed in the Comoros.

== Geography ==
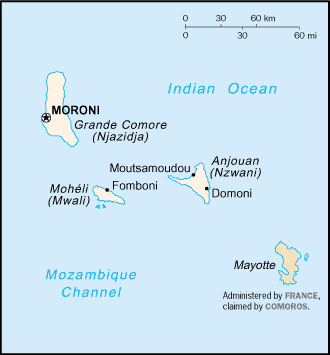
A map of the Comoros

The Comoros is formed by Ngazidja (Grande Comore), Mwali (Mohéli) and Ndzwani (Anjouan), three major islands in the Comoros Archipelago, as well as many minor islets. The islands are officially known by their Comorian-language names, though international sources still use their French names (given in parentheses above). The capital and largest city, Moroni, is located on Ngazidja, and the most densely populated city is Anjouan. The archipelago is situated in the Indian Ocean in the Mozambique Channel, between the African coast (nearest to Mozambique and Tanzania) and Madagascar.

At 1,659 km^{2} (641 sq mi), it is one of the smallest countries in the world. The Comoros also has a claim to 320 km^{2} (120 sq mi) of territorial seas. The interiors of the islands vary from steep mountains to low hills.

The areas and populations (at the 2017 Census) of the main islands are as follows:

Name	Area km^{2}	Population census 2017
Mwali	211	51,567
Ngazidja	1,024	379,367
Ndzwani	424	327,382
Totals	1,659	758,316

Ngazidja is the largest of the Comoros Archipelago, with an area of 1,024 km^{2}. It is also the most recent island and therefore has rocky soil. Its two volcanoes, Karthala (active) and La Grille (dormant), and the lack of good harbours are distinctive characteristics of its terrain. Mwali, with its capital at Fomboni, is the smallest of the three major islands. Ndzwani, whose capital is Mutsamudu, has a distinctive triangular shape caused by three mountain chains – Shisiwani, Nioumakele and Jimilime – emanating from a central peak, Mount Ntingui (1,575 metres or 5,167 feet).

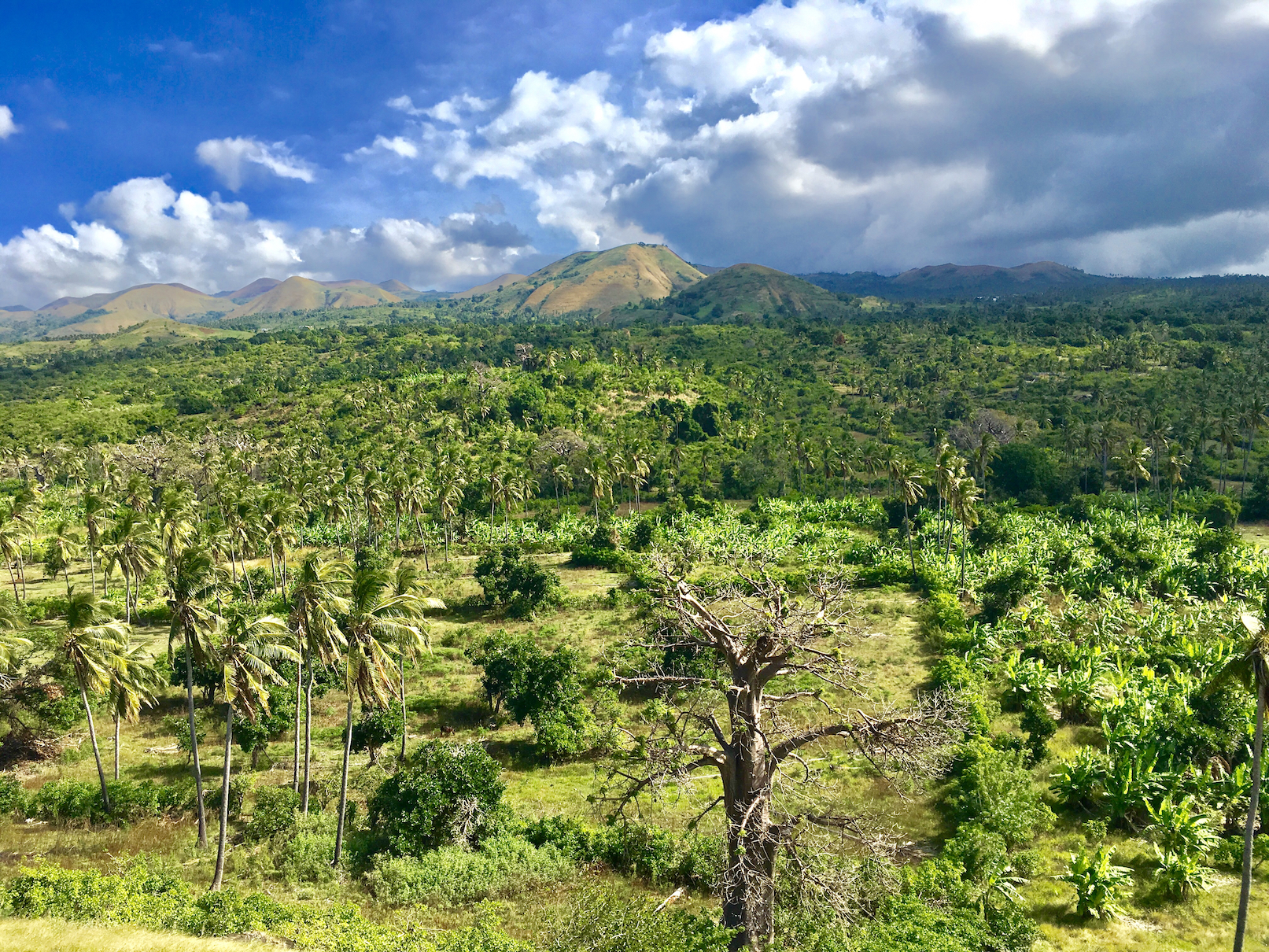
Grande Comore landscape

The archipelago was formed by volcanic activity. Mount Karthala, an active shield volcano, is the country's highest point, at 2,361 metres (7,746 feet). It contains the Comoros' largest patch of disappearing rainforest. Karthala is currently one of the most active volcanoes in the world, with a minor eruption in May 2006 and prior eruptions as recently as April 2005 and 1991. In the 2005 eruption, which lasted from 17 to 19 April, 40,000 citizens were evacuated, and the crater lake in the volcano's three-by-four-kilometre (2-by-2 1/2-mile) caldera was destroyed.

The Comoros also lays claim to the Îles Éparses or Îles éparses de l'océan indien (Scattered Islands in the Indian Ocean) – Glorioso Islands, comprising Grande Glorieuse, Île du Lys, Wreck Rock, South Rock, Verte Rocks (three islets) and three unnamed islets – one of France's overseas districts. The Glorioso Islands were administered by the colonial Comoros before 1975 and are therefore sometimes considered part of the Comoros Archipelago. Banc du Geyser, a former island in the Comoros Archipelago, now submerged, is geographically located in the Îles Éparses but was annexed by Madagascar in 1976 as an unclaimed territory. The Comoros and France each still view the Banc du Geyser as part of the Glorioso Islands and thus part of its particular exclusive economic zone.

=== Climate ===
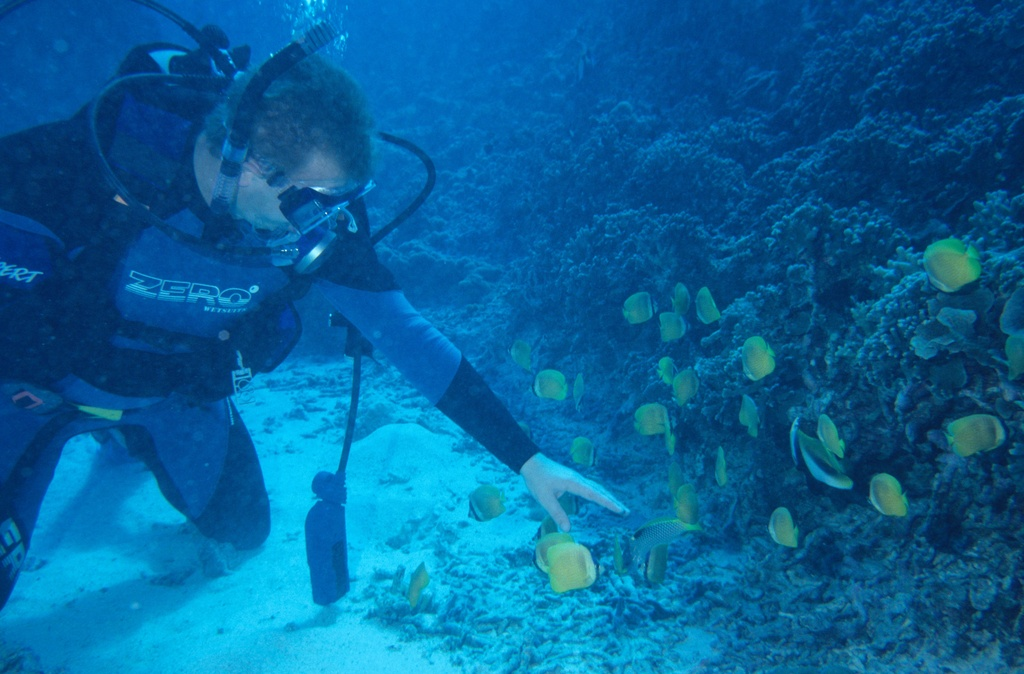
Comoros diver with fish

The climate is generally tropical and mild, and the two major seasons are distinguishable by their raininess. The temperature reaches an average of 29–30 °C (84–86 °F) in March, the hottest month in the rainy season (called kashkazi/kaskazi [meaning north monsoon], which runs from November to April), and an average low of 19 °C (66 °F) in the cool, dry season (kusi (meaning south monsoon), which proceeds from May to October). The islands are rarely subject to cyclones.

=== Biodiversity ===
The Comoros constitute an ecoregion in their own right, Comoros forests. It had a 2018 Forest Landscape Integrity Index mean score of 7.69/10, ranking it 33rd globally out of 172 countries. In 1952 a specimen of the West Indian Ocean coelacanth fish was re-discovered off the Comoros coast. The 66-million-year-old species was thought to have been long extinct until its first recorded appearance in 1938 off the South African coast. Between 1938 and 1975, 84 specimens were caught and recorded.

=== Protected areas ===
National parks are Karthala, Coelacanth, and Mitsamiouli Ndroudi on Grande Comore; Mount Ntringui and Shisiwani on Anjouan; and Mohéli on Mohéli. Karthala and Mount Ntrigui national parks cover the highest peaks on the respective islands, and Coelacanth, Mitsamiouli Ndroudi, and Shisiwani are marine national parks that protect coastal waters and fringing reefs. Mohéli National Park includes both terrestrial and marine areas.

== Government ==
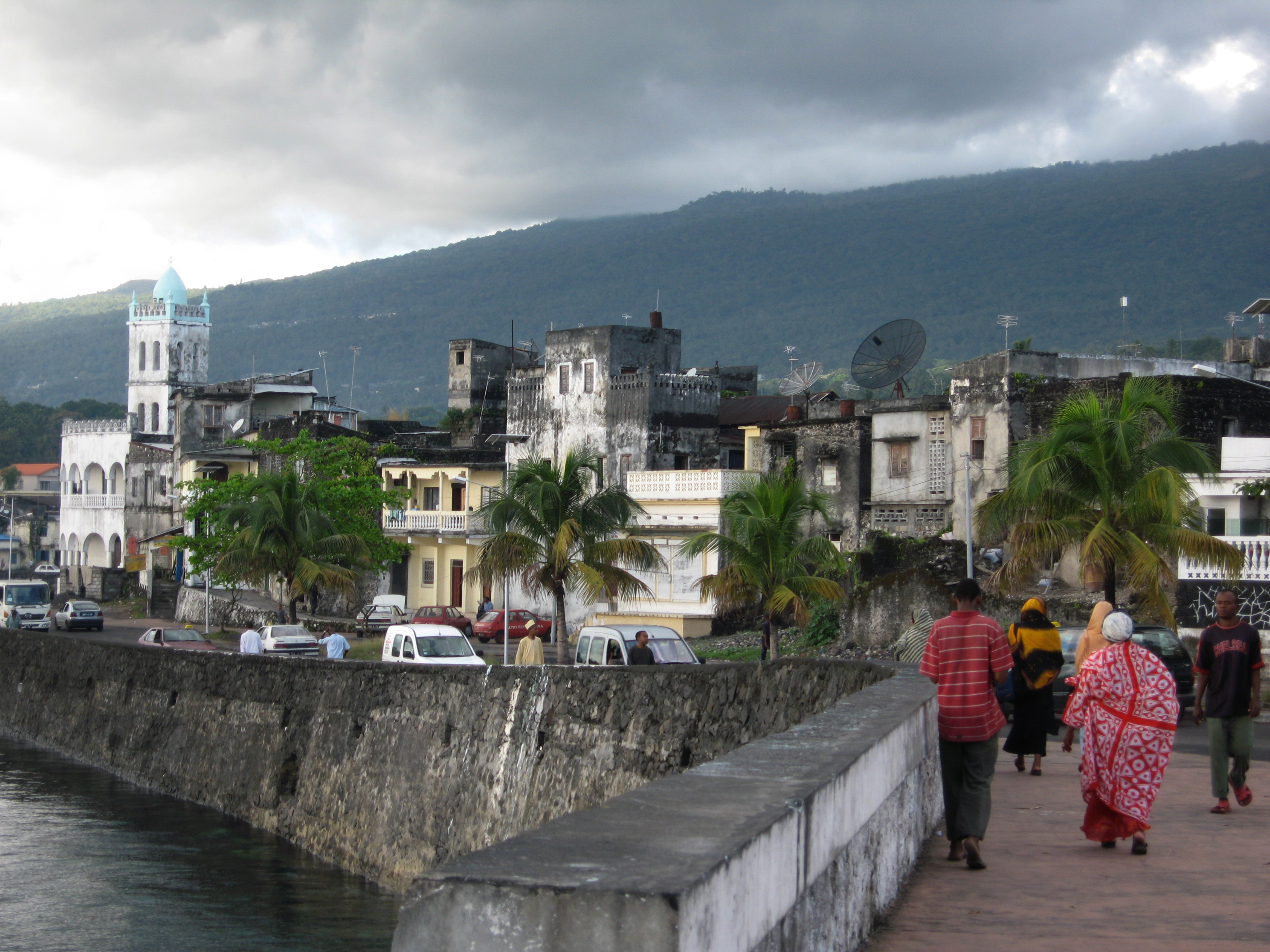
Moroni, capital of the Comoros, with the port and Badjanani Mosque

Politics of the Comoros takes place in a framework of a unitary presidential republic, whereby the President of the Comoros is both head of state and head of government, and of a multi-party system. The Constitution of the Union of the Comoros was ratified by referendum on 23 December 2001, and the islands' constitutions were adopted and their executives elected in the following months. It had previously been considered a military dictatorship, and the transfer of power from Azali Assoumani to Ahmed Abdallah Mohamed Sambi in May 2006 was a watershed moment as it was the first peaceful transfer in Comorian history.

Executive power is exercised by the government. Legislative power is vested in both the government and parliament. The preamble of the constitution guarantees an Islamic inspiration in governance, a commitment to human rights, and several specific enumerated rights, democracy, "a common destiny" for all Comorians. Each of the islands (according to Title II of the Constitution) has a great amount of autonomy in the Union, including having their own constitutions (or fundamental law), president, and Parliament. The presidency and Assembly of the Union are distinct from each of the islands' governments. Up to a referendum in 2018 (62.7% participation, 92.34% for the amendment according to the Comorian government), the presidency of the Union rotated between the islands.

=== Legal system ===
The legal system rests on Islamic law, an inherited French (Napoleonic Code) legal code, and customary law (mila na ntsi). Village elders, kadis or civilian courts settle most disputes. The judiciary is independent of the legislative and the executive. The Supreme Court acts as a Constitutional Council in resolving constitutional questions and supervising presidential elections. As High Court of Justice, the Supreme Court also arbitrates in cases where the government is accused of malpractice. The Supreme Court consists of two members selected by the president, two elected by the Federal Assembly, and one by the council of each island.

=== Political culture ===
In February 2009, IRIN reported that around 80 percent of the central government's annual budget was spent on the complex administrative system which provided for a semi-autonomous government and president for each of the three islands and a rotating presidency for the overarching Union government.

=== Foreign relations ===
President of the Comoros Azali Assoumani with Russian President Vladimir Putin at the Russia–Africa Summit in Moscow, October 2026

In November 1975, the Comoros became the 143rd member of the United Nations. The nation was defined as comprising the entire archipelago, although the citizens of Mayotte chose to remain French citizens and keep their island as a French territory.

The Comoros has repeatedly pressed its claim to Mayotte before the United Nations General Assembly, which adopted a series of resolutions under the caption "Question of the Comorian Island of Mayotte", opining that Mayotte belongs to the Comoros under the principle that the territorial integrity of colonial territories should be preserved upon independence. As a practical matter, however, these resolutions have little effect and there is no foreseeable likelihood that Mayotte will become de facto part of the Comoros without its people's consent. More recently, the Assembly has maintained this item on its agenda but deferred it from year to year without taking action. Other bodies, including the Organisation of African Unity, the Movement of Non-Aligned Countries and the Organisation of Islamic Cooperation, have similarly questioned French sovereignty over Mayotte. To close the debate and to avoid being integrated by force in the Union of the Comoros, the population of Mayotte overwhelmingly chose to become an overseas department and a region of France in a 2009 referendum. Mayotte was recognised as an outermost region by the European Union; this decision legally integrates Mayotte in the French Republic.

The Comoros is a member of the United Nations, the African Union, the Arab League, the World Bank, the International Monetary Fund, the Indian Ocean Commission and the African Development Bank. The Comoros acceded to the Kyoto Protocol to the United Nations Framework Convention on Climate Change in 2008. The Comoros signed the UN treaty on the Prohibition of Nuclear Weapons. Assoumani, President of the Comoros and Chair of the African Union, attended the 2023 Russia–Africa Summit in Saint Petersburg.

In May 2013, the Union of the Comoros became known for filing a referral to the Office of the Prosecutor of the International Criminal Court (ICC) regarding the events of "the 31 May 2010 Israeli raid on the Humanitarian Aid Flotilla bound for the Gaza Strip". In November 2014 the ICC Prosecutor decided that the events did constitute war crimes but did not meet the gravity standards of bringing the case before ICC.

=== Military ===
The military consists of a small standing army and a 500-member police force, as well as a 600-member defence force. A defence treaty with France provides naval resources for protection of territorial waters, training of Comorian military personnel, and air surveillance. France maintains the presence of a few senior officers at government request, as well as a small maritime base and a Foreign Legion detachment on Mayotte.

Once the new government was installed in 2011, an expert mission from UNREC (Lomé) came to the Comoros and produced guidelines for the elaboration of a national security policy, which were discussed by different actors, notably the national defence authorities and civil society. By the end of the programme in 2012, a normative framework agreed upon by all entities involved in SSR will have been established. This will then have to be adopted by Parliament and implemented by the authorities.

=== Human rights ===
Both male and female same-sex sexual acts are illegal. Such acts are punished with up to five years' imprisonment.

== Economy ==
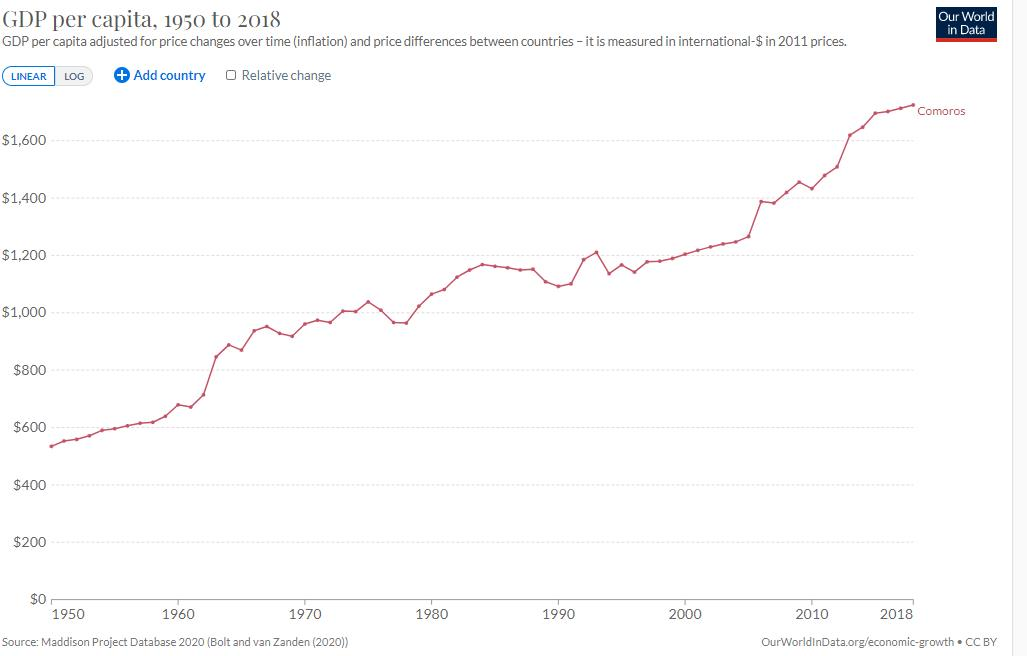
GDP per capita development, since 1950

The level of poverty is high, but "judging by the international poverty threshold of $1.9 per person per day, 20 percent of Comorians could be classified as poor, a rate that places the Comoros ahead of other low-income countries and 30 percentage points ahead of other countries in Sub-Saharan Africa." Poverty declined by about 10% between 2014 and 2018, and living conditions generally improved. Economic inequality was historically higher in the country relative to other lower-middle income African countries, though it has declined significantly in recent years. There is a major gap between urban and rural areas, with nearly 80% of the poor living in the latter. Remittances through the sizable Comorian diaspora form a substantial part of GDP and have contributed to decreases in poverty and increases in living standards. According to the French Development Agency, remittances account for around 20% of the GDP in 2023, with the country being among the top recipients of remittances globally relative to its GDP.

According to ILO's ILOSTAT statistical database, between 1991 and 2019 the unemployment rate as a percent of the total labor force ranged from 4.38% to 4.3%. A 2005 paper by the Comoros Ministry of Planning and Regional Development, however, reports "registered unemployment rate is 14.3 percent, distributed very unevenly among and within the islands, but with marked incidence in urban areas." In 2019, more than 56% of the labor force was employed in agriculture, with 29% employed in industry and 14% employed in services. The agricultural sector is based on the export of spices, including vanilla, cinnamon, and cloves, and thus is susceptible to price fluctuations in the volatile world commodity market for these goods. The Comoros is the world's largest producer of ylang-ylang, a plant whose extracted essential oil is used in the perfume industry; some 80% of the world's supply comes from the Comoros.

High population densities, as much as 1000 per square kilometre in the densest agricultural zones, for what is still a mostly rural, agricultural economy may lead to an environmental crisis in the near future, especially considering the high rate of population growth. In 2004 the Comoros' real GDP growth was a low 1.9% and real GDP per capita continued to decline. These declines are explained by factors including declining investment, drops in consumption, rising inflation, and an increase in trade imbalance due in part to lowered cash crop prices, especially vanilla.

Fiscal policy is constrained by erratic fiscal revenues, a bloated civil service wage bill, and an external debt that is far above the HIPC threshold. Membership in the franc zone, the main anchor of stability, has nevertheless helped contain pressures on domestic prices. The Comoros has an inadequate transportation system, a young and rapidly increasing population, and few natural resources. The low educational level of the labour force contributes to a subsistence level of economic activity, high unemployment, and a heavy dependence on foreign grants and technical assistance. Agriculture contributed 36,6% to the GDP in 2024 and provides most of the exports, with cloves alone accounting for 64,9% in 2023. The government is struggling to upgrade education and technical training, to privatise commercial and industrial enterprises, to improve health services, to diversify exports, to promote tourism, and to reduce the high population growth rate. The Comoros is a member of the Organisation for the Harmonisation of Business Law in Africa (OHADA). In 2024, the Comoros joined the World Trade Organization.

== Demographics ==
Largest cities or towns in Comoros Source:
Rank	Name	Island	Pop.
1	Moroni	Grande Comore	111,329
2	Mutsamudu	Anjouan	30,000
3	Ouani	Anjouan	22,501
4	Mandza	Grande Comore	21,000
5	Fomboni	Mohéli	18,277
6	Domoni	Anjouan	16,276
7	Adda-Douéni	Anjouan	10,858
8	Kourani	Grande Comore	10,000
9	Bazimini	Anjouan	8,952
10	Mkazi	Grande Comore	8,438

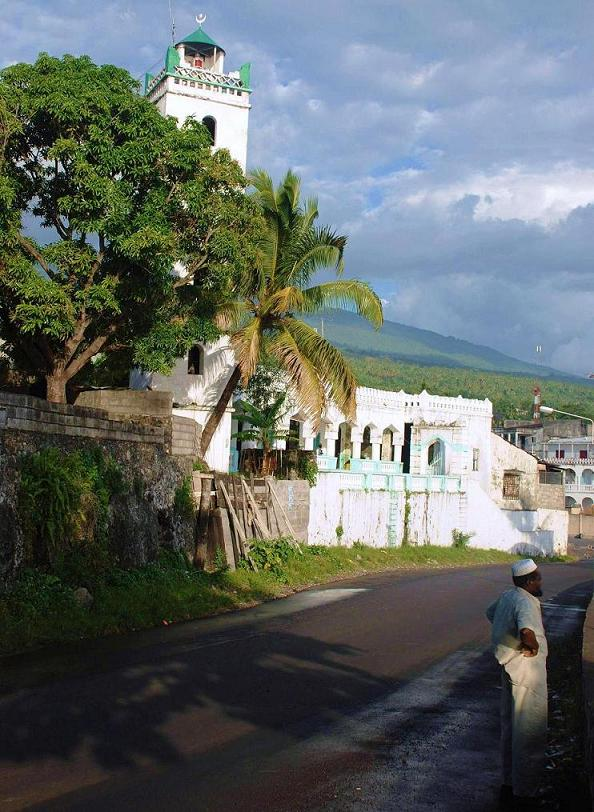
A mosque in Moroni

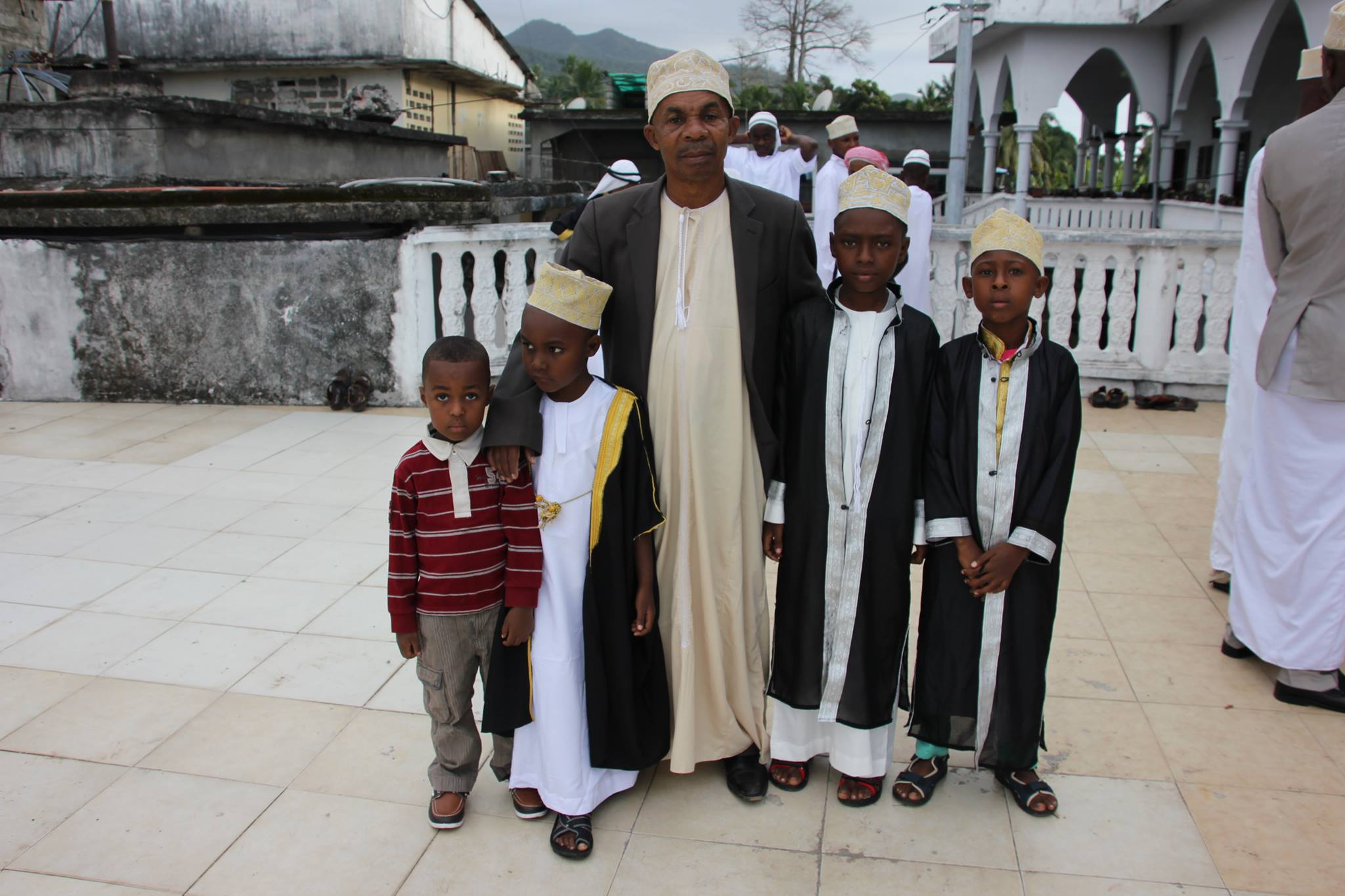
A Comorian man and his children wearing the kofia hat during Eid celebrations in front of the Great Mosque of Mbéni

With about 940,000 residents, the Comoros is one of the least populous countries in the world, but its population density is high, with an average of 457 inhabitants per square kilometre (1,180/sq mi). In 2001, 34% of the population was considered urban, but the urban population has since grown; in recent years rural population growth has been negative, while overall population growth is still relatively high. In 1958 the population was 183,133.

In 2009, almost half the population of the Comoros was under the age of 15. Major urban centres include Moroni, Mitsamihuli, Foumbouni, Mutsamudu, Domoni, and Fomboni. There are between 200,000 and 350,000 Comorians in France.

=== Ethnic groups ===
The islands are 97.1% ethnically Comorian, which is a mixture of Bantu, the Austronesian admixed Bantu Malagasy, and Arab people. Minorities include Makua and Indian (mostly Ismaili). There are recent immigrants of Chinese origin in Grande Comore (especially Moroni). Although most French left after independence in 1975, a small Creole community, descended from settlers from France, Madagascar and Réunion, lives in the Comoros.

=== Languages ===
The most common languages of the Comoros are the Comorian languages, spoken by over 95% of the population. These languages are collectively known as Shikomori and are related to Swahili. The four different variants of Comorian (Shingazidja, Shimwali, Shindzwani and Shimaore) are spoken on each of the four islands. Arabic and Latin scripts are both used, Arabic being the more widely used, and an official orthography has recently been developed for the Latin script.

Arabic and French are also official languages. Because no accepted standardized written form currently exists for Comorian, Arabic and French are used as the mediums of instruction from primary to tertiary education. Arabic is widely known as a second language, being the language of Quranic teaching. French is the administrative language and the language of most non-Quranic formal education. In addition, English is taught in later grades. A 2025 Afrobarometer survey found that 89.9% of Comorians primarily speak Shikomori at home while 9.9% have French as their main home language.

=== Religion ===
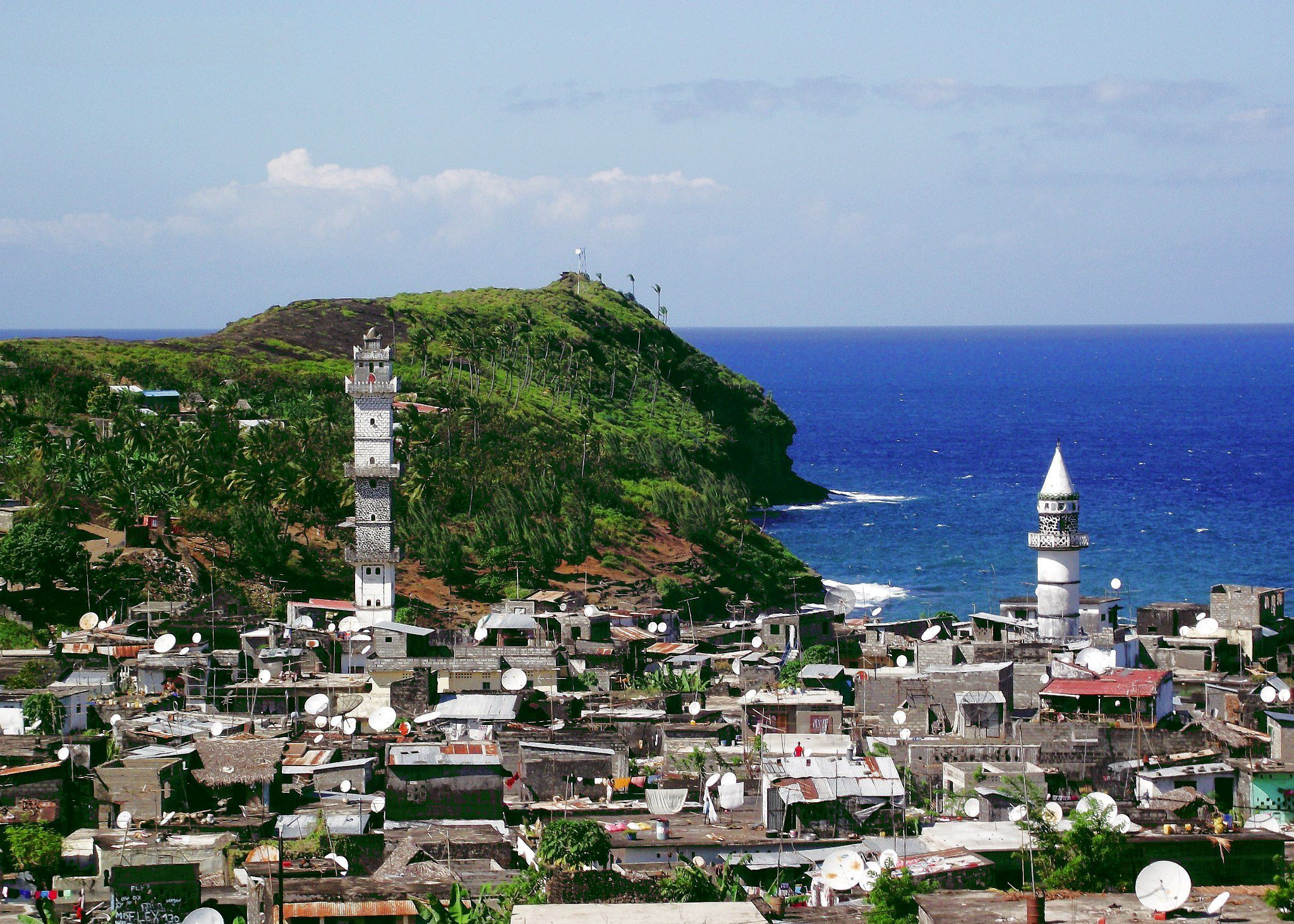
A view of Domoni, Anjouan including mosque

Sunni Islam is the dominant religion, followed by as much as 99% of the population. Comoros is the only Muslim-majority country in Southern Africa and one of the three southernmost Muslim-majority territories, along with Mayotte and the Australian territory of Cocos Islands. A minority of the population of the Comoros are Christian, both Catholic and Protestant denominations are represented, and most Malagasy residents are also Christian. Immigrants from metropolitan France are mostly Catholic.

=== Health ===
The Comoros has 15 physicians per 100,000 people. The fertility rate was 4.7 births per adult woman in 2004. Life expectancy at birth is 67 years for females and 62 years for males, with the average life expectancy being 63.42 years in 2021. The Comorian National Institute of Statistics has found that the total fertility rate has decreased over time, from a peak of 7.14 in 1973 to 3.98 in 2021. Although the infant mortality rate declined sharply from 152 to 47 deaths per 1,000 live births between 1970 and 2020, it remains high compared to rates in developed countries. In the 2024 Global Hunger Index, Comoros ranks 81st out of 127 countries with sufficient data, with a score of 18.8, which indicates a moderate level of hunger.

== Education ==
Almost all children attend Quran religious schools, usually before, although increasingly in tandem with regular schooling. Children are taught about the Qur'an, and memorise it, and learn the Arabic script. Most parents prefer their children to attend Quran religious schools before moving on to the French-English based schooling system. Although the state sector is plagued by a lack of resources, and the teachers by unpaid salaries, there are numerous private and community schools of relatively good standard. The national curriculum, apart from a few years during the revolutionary period immediately post-independence, has been very much based on the French system, both because resources are French and most Comorans hope to go on to further education in France, Spain and Italy. There have recently been moves to "Comorianise" the syllabus and integrate the two systems, the formal and the Quran religious schools, into one, thus moving away from the secular educational system inherited from France.

Pre-colonisation education systems focused on necessary skills such as agriculture, caring for livestock and completing household tasks. Religious education also taught Islam. The education system underwent a transformation during colonisation in the early 20th century which brought secular education based on the French system. This was mainly for children of the elite. After Comoros gained independence in 1975, the education system changed again. Funding for teachers' salaries was lost, and many went on strike. Thus, the public education system was not functioning between 1997 and 2001. Since gaining independence, the education system has also undergone a democratisation and options exist for those other than the elite. Enrollment has also grown.

In 2000, 44.2% of children aged 5 to 14 years were attending school. There is a general lack of facilities, equipment, qualified teachers, textbooks and other resources. Salaries for teachers are often so far in arrears that many refuse to work. Prior to 2000, students seeking a university education had to attend school outside of the country In Europe and Americas especially France and the United Kingdom. However, in the 2000s a university was created in the country. This served to help economic growth and to fight the "flight" of many educated people who were not returning to the islands to work.

Comorian has no native script, but both the Arabic and Latin alphabets are used. In 2004, about 57 percent of the population was literate in the Latin script while more than 90 percent were literate in the Arabic script.

== Culture ==
Traditionally, women on Ndzwani wear red and white patterned garments called shiromani, while on Ngazidja and Mwali colourful shawls called leso are worn. Many women apply a paste of ground sandalwood and coral called msindzano to their faces. Traditional male clothing is a long white shirt known as a nkandu, and a bonnet called a kofia.

=== Marriage ===
There are two types of marriages in Comoros, the little marriage (known as Mna daho on Ngazidja) and the customary marriage (known as ada on Ngazidja, harusi on the other islands). The little marriage is a simple legal marriage. It is small, intimate, and inexpensive, and the bride's dowry is nominal. A man may undertake a number of Mna daho marriages in his lifetime, often at the same time, a woman fewer; but both men and women will usually only undertake one ada, or grand marriage, and this must generally be within the village. The hallmarks of the grand marriage are dazzling gold jewelry, two weeks of celebration and an enormous bridal dowry. Although the expenses are shared between both families as well as with a wider social circle, an ada wedding on Ngazidja can cost up to €50,000. Many couples take a lifetime to save for their ada, and it is not uncommon for a marriage to be attended by a couple's adult children.

The ada marriage marks a man's transition in the Ngazidja age system from youth to elder. His status in the social hierarchy greatly increases, and he will henceforth be entitled to speak in public and participate in the political process, both in his village and more widely across the island. He will be entitled to display his status by wearing a mharuma, a type of shawl, across his shoulders, and he can enter the mosque by the door reserved for elders, and sit at the front. A woman's status also changes, although less formally, as she becomes a "mother" and moves into her own house. The system is less formalised on the other islands, but the marriage is nevertheless a significant and costly event across the archipelago. The ada is often criticized because of its great expense, but at the same time it is a source of social cohesion and the main reason why migrants in France and elsewhere continue to send money home. Increasingly, marriages are also being taxed for the purposes of village development.

=== Kinship and social structure ===
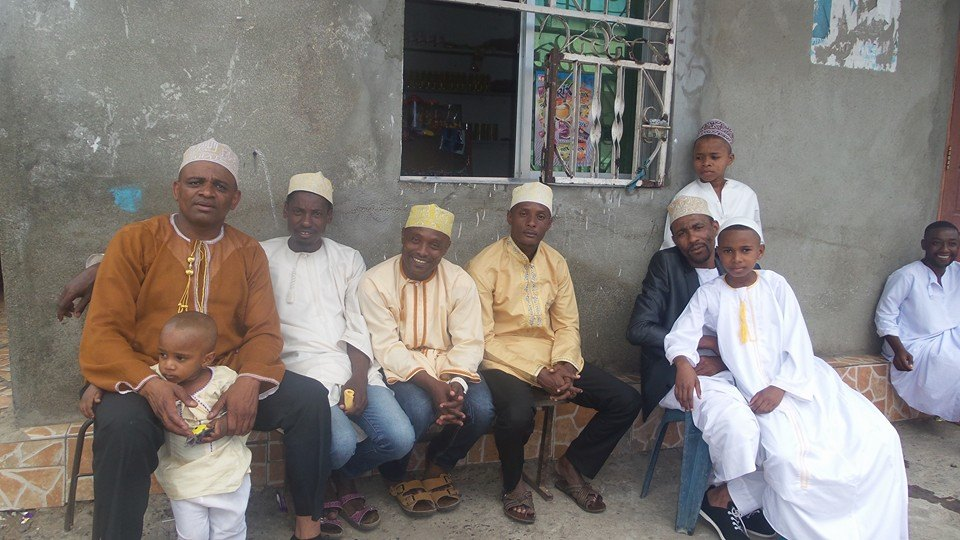
Villagers in Bangwa Kuuni, Ngazidja

Comorian society has a bilateral descent system. Lineage membership and inheritance of immovable goods (land, housing) is matrilineal, passed in the maternal line, similar to many Bantu peoples who are also matrilineal, while other goods and patronymics are passed in the male line. However, there are differences between the islands, the matrilineal element being stronger on Ngazidja.

=== Music ===
Twarab music, imported from Zanzibar in the early 20th century, remains the most influential genre on the islands and is popular at ada marriages.

=== Media ===
There are two daily national newspapers: the government-owned Al-Watwan and the privately owned La Gazette des Comores, both published in Moroni. There are smaller newsletters published on an irregular basis as well as a variety of news websites. The government-owned ORTC (Office de Radio et Télévision des Comores) provides national radio and television service. There is a TV station run by the Anjouan regional government, and regional governments on Grande Comore and Anjouan each operate a radio station. There are also a few independent and small community radio stations on Grande Comore and Mohéli, and these two islands have access to Mayotte Radio and French TV.

== See also ==
- Outline of the Comoros
