= Outline of the Comoros =

Island nation in the Indian Ocean

Flag of the Comoros

National seal of the Comoros

Location of the Comoros

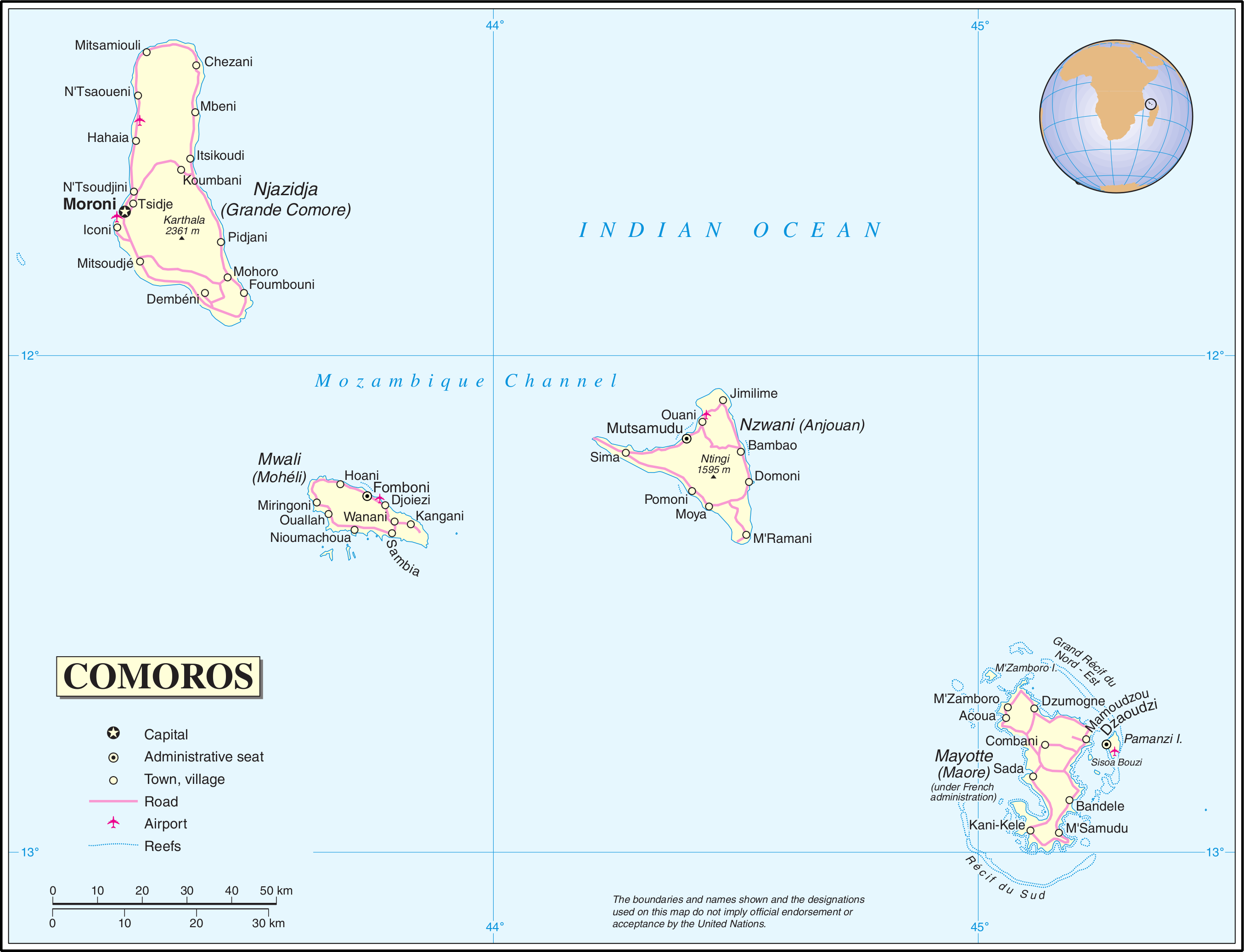
Enlargeable map of the Union of the Comoros

The following outline is provided as an overview of and topical guide to Comoros:

Comoros – sovereign island nation located in the Indian Ocean off the eastern coast of Africa on the northern end of the Mozambique Channel between northern Madagascar and northeastern Mozambique. The nearest countries to the Comoros are Mozambique, Tanzania, Madagascar, and the Seychelles. At 2,235 km^{2} (863 sq mi) the Comoros is the third smallest African nation by area; with a population estimated at 798,000 it is the sixth smallest African nation by population (though it has one of the highest population densities in Africa), and is the southernmost member state of the Arab League. Its name derives from the Arabic word qamar ("moon"). The country is notable for its diverse culture and history, as a nation formed at the crossroads of many civilizations. It has three official languages—Comorian (Shikomor), Arabic, and French, and it is the only state to be a member of each of the African Union, Francophonie, Organisation of Islamic Cooperation, Arab League, and Indian Ocean Commission, among other international organizations. However, it has had a troubled history since independence in 1975, marked by a number of coups d'état.

== General reference ==
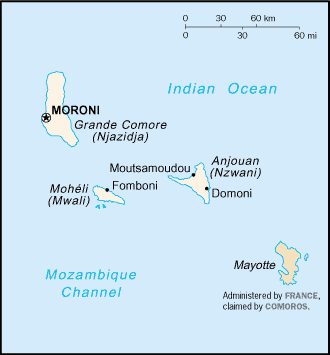
An enlargeable basic map of the Comoros

- Pronunciation: /ˈkɒməroʊz/
- Common English country name: The Comoros
- Official English country name: The Union of the Comoros
- Common endonym(s):
- Official endonym(s):
- Adjectival(s): Comorian
- Demonym(s): Comoran(s), Comorian(s)
- ISO country codes: KM, COM, 174
- ISO region codes: See ISO 3166-2:KM
- Internet country code top-level domain: .km

== Geography of the Comoros ==
Geography of the Comoros

- Comoros is: a country
- Location:
  - Eastern Hemisphere and Southern Hemisphere
  - Africa (off its east coast)
    - East Africa
    - Southern Africa
  - Indian Ocean
  - Time zone: East Africa Time (UTC+03)
  - Extreme points of the Comoros
    - High: Le Kartala 2,360 m (7,743 ft)
    - Low: Indian Ocean 0 m
  - Land boundaries: none
  - Coastline: 340 km
- Population of the Comoros: 682,000 (July 2007) - 160th most populous country
- Area of the Comoros: 2,235 km^{2}
- Atlas of the Comoros

=== Environment of the Comoros ===
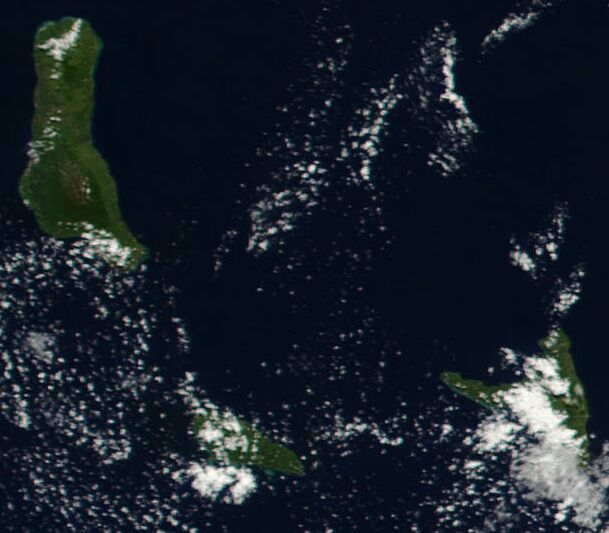
An enlargeable satellite image of the Comoros

- Climate of the Comoros
- Wildlife of the Comoros
  - Fauna of the Comoros
    - Birds of the Comoros
    - Mammals of the Comoros

==== Natural geographic features of the Comoros ====
- Glaciers in the Comoros: none
- Comoro Islands
- Mountains of the Comoros
  - Volcanoes in the Comoros
- Rivers of the Comoros
- World Heritage Sites in the Comoros: None

==== Administrative divisions of the Comoros ====
===== List of islands of the Comoros =====
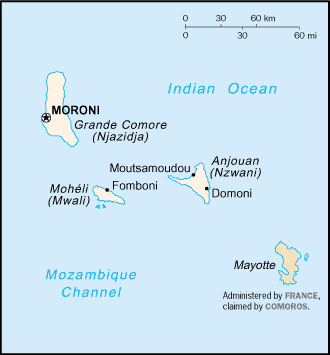

Island	Administrative Status
Anjouan	Autonomous island
Grande Comore	Autonomous island
Mohéli	Autonomous island
Mayotte	Claimed by Comoros; administered by France as an overseas department and region (Note: Mayotte is claimed by Comoros, while being a department, region and being administered by the French Republic)

Prefectures of the Comoros

- Capital of the Comoros: Moroni
- Cities of the Comoros

== Government and politics of the Comoros ==
Politics of the Comoros

- Form of government: federal presidential republic
- Capital of the Comoros: Moroni
- Elections in the Comoros
- Political parties in the Comoros

=== Branches of government ===
==== Executive branch of the government of the Comoros ====
- Head of state: President of the Comoros
- Head of government: Prime Minister of the Comoros

==== Legislative branch of the government of the Comoros ====
- Assembly of the Union of the Comoros (unicameral)

==== Judicial branch of the government of the Comoros ====
Court system of the Comoros

=== Foreign relations of the Comoros ===
Foreign relations of the Comoros

- Diplomatic missions in the Comoros
- Diplomatic missions of the Comoros

==== International organization membership ====
The Union of the Comoros is a member of:

- African, Caribbean, and Pacific Group of States (ACP)
- African Development Bank Group (AfDB)
- African Union (AU)
- Arab Monetary Fund (AMF)
- Common Market for Eastern and Southern Africa (COMESA)
- Conference des Ministres des Finances des Pays de la Zone Franc (FZ)
- Food and Agriculture Organization (FAO)
- Group of 77 (G77)
- Indian Ocean Commission (InOC)
- International Bank for Reconstruction and Development (IBRD)
- International Civil Aviation Organization (ICAO)
- International Criminal Court (ICCt)
- International Criminal Police Organization (Interpol)
- International Development Association (IDA)
- International Federation of Red Cross and Red Crescent Societies (IFRCS)
- International Finance Corporation (IFC)
- International Fund for Agricultural Development (IFAD)
- International Labour Organization (ILO)
- International Maritime Organization (IMO)
- International Mobile Satellite Organization (IMSO)
- International Monetary Fund (IMF)
- International Olympic Committee (IOC)
- International Red Cross and Red Crescent Movement (ICRM)
- International Telecommunication Union (ITU)
- International Telecommunications Satellite Organization (ITSO)
- International Trade Union Confederation (ITUC)
- Inter-Parliamentary Union (IPU)
- Islamic Development Bank (IDB)
- League of Arab States (LAS)
- Nonaligned Movement (NAM)
- Organisation internationale de la Francophonie (OIF)
- Organisation of Islamic Cooperation (OIC)
- Organisation for the Prohibition of Chemical Weapons (OPCW)
- United Nations (UN)
- United Nations Conference on Trade and Development (UNCTAD)
- United Nations Educational, Scientific, and Cultural Organization (UNESCO)
- United Nations Industrial Development Organization (UNIDO)
- Universal Postal Union (UPU)
- World Customs Organization (WCO)
- World Federation of Trade Unions (WFTU)
- World Health Organization (WHO)
- World Intellectual Property Organization (WIPO)
- World Meteorological Organization (WMO)
- World Trade Organization (WTO) (observer)

=== Law and order in the Comoros ===
Law of the Comoros

- Human rights in the Comoros
  - LGBT rights in the Comoros
  - Freedom of religion in the Comoros
- Law Enforcement in Comoros

=== Military of the Comoros ===
Military of the Comoros

- Command
  - Commander-in-chief
- Forces
  - Army of the Comoros
  - Air Force of the Comoros

=== Local government in the Comoros ===
Local government in the Comoros

== History of the Comoros ==
- Current events of the Comoros

=== History by subject ===
- History of rail transport in the Comoros
- Postage stamps and postal history of the Comoros

== Culture of the Comoros ==
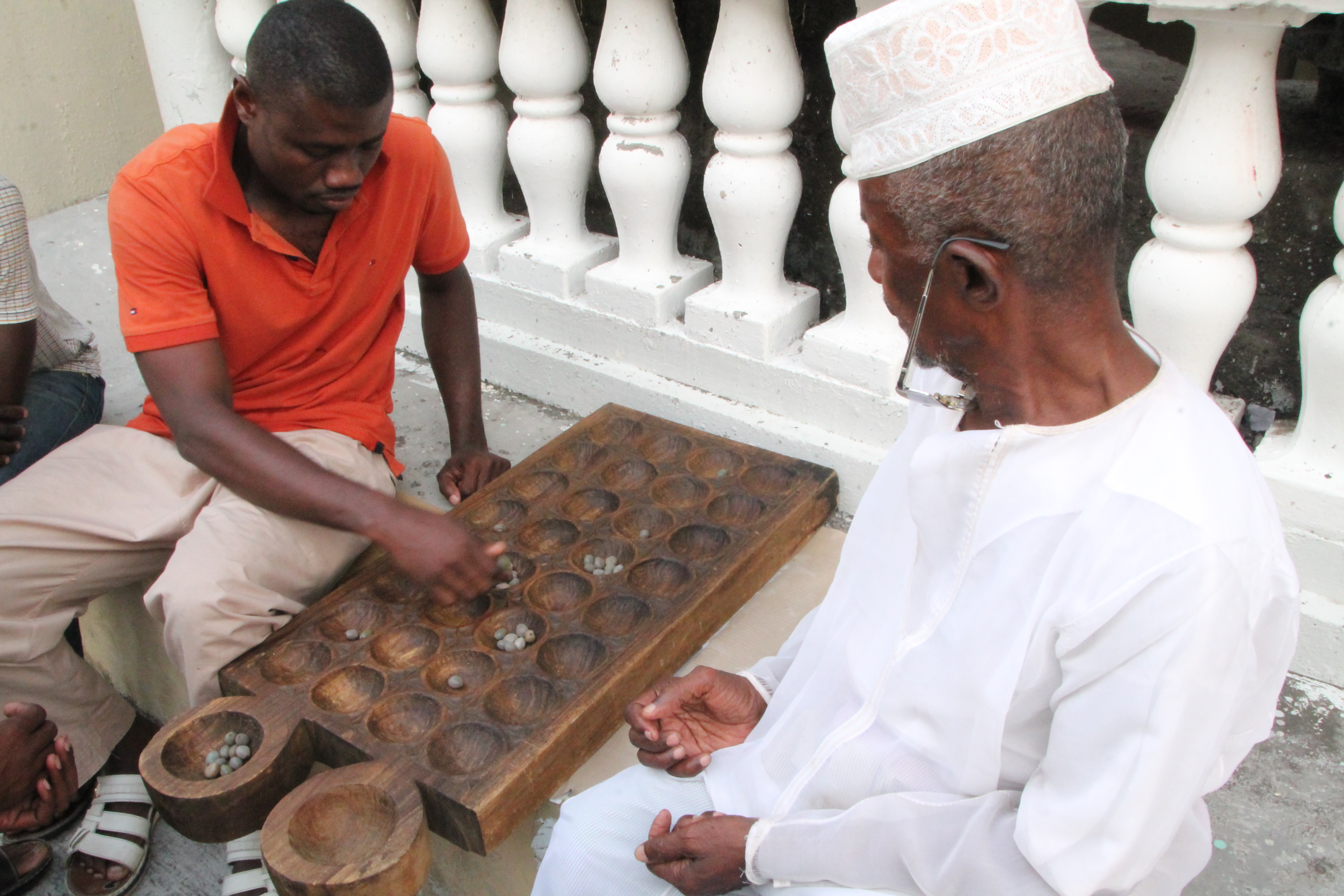
Men playing Mraha in Iconi

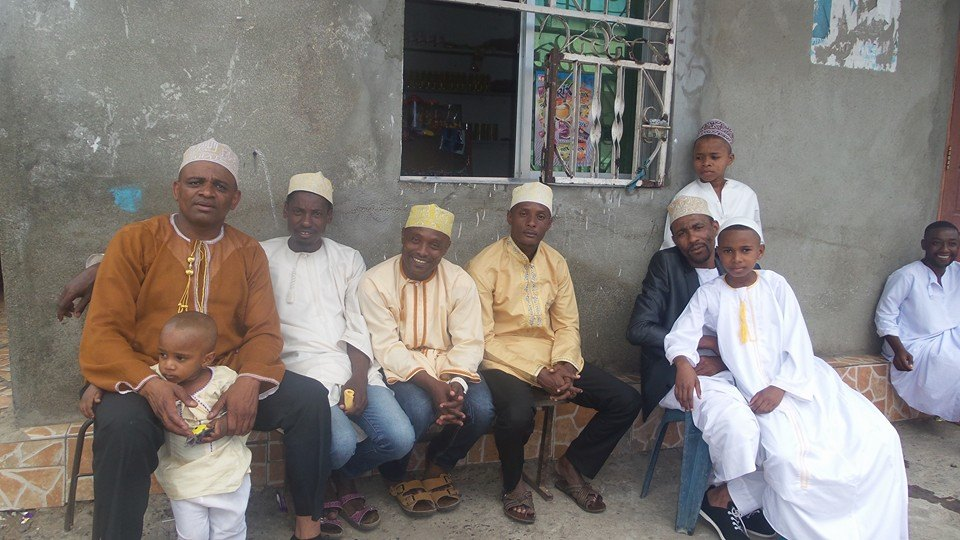
Villagers in Bangwa Kuuni, Ngazidja, during Eid al-Adha
- Languages of the Comoros
  - Comorian language
- Mass media in the Comoros
- National symbols of the Comoros
  - National seal of the Comoros
  - Flag of the Comoros
  - National anthem of the Comoros
- People of the Comoros
- Public holidays in the Comoros
- Religion in the Comoros
  - Christianity in the Comoros
  - Islam in the Comoros

=== Art in the Comoros ===
- Music of the Comoros

=== Sports in the Comoros ===
- Football in the Comoros
- Comoros at the Olympics

== Economy and infrastructure of the Comoros ==
Economy of the Comoros

- Economic rank, by nominal GDP (2007): 179th (one hundred and seventy ninth)
- Agriculture in the Comoros
- Communications in the Comoros
  - Internet in the Comoros
- Companies of the Comoros
- Currency of the Comoros: Franc
  - ISO 4217: KMF
- Health care in the Comoros
- Mining in the Comoros
- Tourism in the Comoros
  - Visa policy of the Comoros
- Transport in the Comoros
  - Airports in the Comoros
  - Rail transport in the Comoros

== Education in the Comoros ==
Education in the Comoros

== Health in the Comoros ==
Health in the Comoros

== See also ==
Comoros

- List of Comoros-related topics
- List of international rankings
- Member state of the United Nations
- Outline of Africa
- Outline of geography

Comorian language
