= M'tsolola =

Comorian stew

M'tsolola (Comorian; French: banane au coco, lit. 'banana with coconut') is a Comorian cuisine stew of green bananas, cassava and coconut milk. Typically made with locally available fish, the stew may also incorporate beef or goat meat. M'tsolola is eaten both in the Comoros and Mayotte.

== Preparation ==
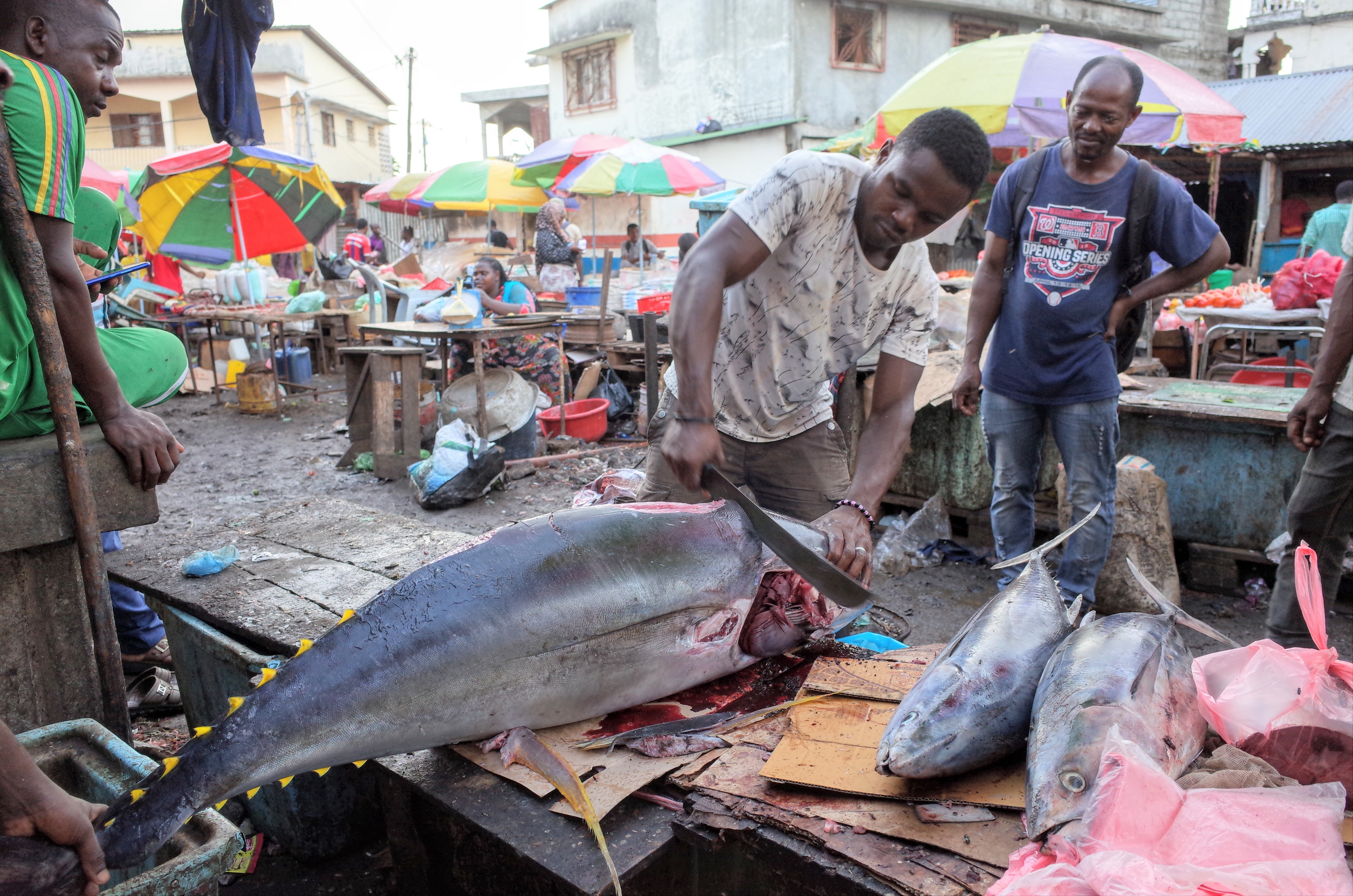
Fish being butchered in a market, Comoros

M'tsolola is usually made using fish - typically a firm-fleshed or oily fish like tuna, mackerel, or mahi mahi - because beef or goat meat typically are expensive, and thus reserved for special occasions unless readily available. The meat or fish is marinated in a paste of chilies and garlic, then poached with green bananas, cassava, tomatoes and onions to make a broth; the broth is usually covered with a banana leaf, imparting additional flavor as it steams. The stew is finished after simmering with fresh coconut milk, kneaded from the flesh of the coconut. It can be served over rice, or on its own.

=== Variations ===
M'tsolola typically includes tomato and onions. A preparation without tomato and onions is more typically called ndrovi wa nazi (Bantu languages for 'banana with coconut').

== Background ==
The cuisine of the Comoros and Mayotte are influenced by its history through the Austronesian expansion and Bantu expansion, the spice trade and Maritime Silk Road, and French colonization. This history of immigrants, traders and colonization introduced the local cuisine to Arab cuisine and French cuisine influences, among others. Similar dishes to m'tsolola exist in Tanzanian cuisine and Mozambican cuisine on the East African coast, which heavily feature stews with coconut milk.

== Consumption and culture ==
M'tsolola is a main dish and is typically eaten without accompaniment in Mayotte.

M'tsolola is eaten for iftar during Ramadan, which almost all Comorians observe, given that the Comoros is nearly 100% Muslim; community banquets are held for iftar in front of mosques. Iftar begins with a meat and rice flour soup, then m'tsolola is served along with tharid, sambousa, and tea, among other dishes.
