= Freedom of religion in the Comoros =

Freedom of religion in Comoros is addressed in the constitution which proclaims equality of rights and obligations for everyone.

However, there are limitations to this right in practice. The country has an area of 838 square miles (2,170 km^{2}) and a population of 852,075. In 2023, 98% of the population is Sunni Muslim.

In 2022, the authorities did not allow non-Sunni religious groups to proselytize or assemble for religious activities in public, although foreigners are permitted to worship at three Christian churches in Moroni, Mutsamudu, and Moheli; foreign Shia Muslims can worship at a Shia mosque in Moroni.

In 2023, the country was scored 2 out of 4 for religious freedom.

The rest of this article in informed by the US State Dept 2009 report on Religious Freedom in Comoros. A later report is available.

== Overview ==
Sunni Muslims make up 98% of the population and government authorities prohibit non-Sunnis from proselytizing. However, there were no known instances where the local authorities and population restricted the right of Christians to practice other aspects of their faith. There was societal discrimination against non-Muslims in some sectors of society; however, accounts of social pressure were anecdotal. Proselytizing for any religion except Islam is illegal, and converts from Islam may be prosecuted under the law. However, such prosecutions are rare and have not resulted in any convictions in recent years. In the past, there were reports of family and community members excluding non-Muslim converts from schools or villages for "evangelizing Muslims".

There is no sharp divide between Sunni and Shi'a, and most Muslims respect the doctrinal differences between the two branches of Islam. Foreigners living on the islands number several hundred, and include Hindus, Jehovah's Witnesses, and members of other Christian groups including Roman Catholics and Protestants.

A few foreign religious groups maintain humanitarian programs, but by agreement with the Government, they did not engage in proselytizing.

== Status of religious freedom ==
=== Legal and policy framework ===
The Constitution provides for freedom of religion, but the Government continued to limit this right in practice. In 2009, an amendment to the Constitution added that Islam is "the religion of the state." In addition, the Constitution states that Islam is the "permanent inspiration of the principles and rules that govern the Union."

The 2002 Constitution reincorporates Ndzuwani (Anjouan), Ngazidja (Grande Comore), and Moheli into a new federation that grants the islands greater autonomy. There are no legal restrictions that prevent Christians from attending church, and non-citizen Christians are allowed to practice their faith without government intervention as long as they do not attempt to convert citizens. Foreigners caught proselytizing for religions other than Islam are subject to deportation.

While the law allows non-Muslims to practice their religion, it prohibits citizens from converting from Islam. The 2002 amended Constitution upholds religious freedom; however, the pre-existing Penal Code prohibits conversion from Islam and has yet to be modified to reflect this standard. Although enforceable, this law is rarely applied.

Government authorities continue to prohibit non-Muslims from proselytizing. A law dating from the early 1980s states "whoever divulges, promotes, or teaches Muslims a religion other than Islam will be punished with a three-month prison sentence and a fine of 50,000 to 500,000 Comoran Francs." However, in practice the government does not impose this fine.

The Grand Mufti is part of the Government and manages a department that handles issues concerning religion and religious administration. The Grand Mufti's position is attached to the Ministry of Islamic Affairs, and he counsels the Government on matters of Islamic faith and ensures that Islamic laws are respected. He is nominated by the President. The Grand Mufti periodically consults with a group of elders to assess whether the principles of Islam are respected, and he regularly addresses the nation on the radio regarding social and religious issues such as marriage, divorce, and education.

While the study of Islam is not compulsory in public schools, the tenets of Islam are sometimes taught in conjunction with the Arabic language in public schools at the middle school level. There are no separate provisions made for religious minorities in public schools; however, foreigners can request that their children not receive Islamic instruction or Arabic language training. Almost all children between the ages of 4 and 7 also attend schools to learn to recite and understand the Qur'an, although attendance is not compulsory for religious minorities. There are more than 10 private schools on the island of Ngazidja (Grande Comore), none of which are specifically non-Muslim.

Several Islamic holy days, including the Islamic New Year, the Birth of the Prophet Muhammad, and Eid al-Fitr, are national holidays.

The flag of Comoros contains Muslim symbols: crescents and stars on a green background.

The Government does not require religious groups to be licensed, registered, or officially recognized.

=== Restrictions on religious freedom ===
The Government does not ban specific religions or religious factions. The Government allows organized religious groups to establish places of worship, train clergy to serve believers, and assemble for peaceful religious activities. However, proselytizing for any religion except Islam is illegal and foreigners caught proselytizing for religions other than Islam were subject to deportation under the law.

In 2013, a law was passed establishing the Sunni Shafi'i doctrine as the only allowable religious practice in the country and placing sanctions on all other religious practice on the grounds of avoiding social unrest and the undermining of national cohesion and unity. The government states it ratified the law due to fears of religious radicalization.

There were no reports of government sponsorship of speech or materials that foster intolerance or hatred toward any religious groups.

The Government does not prohibit, restrict, or punish parents for raising their children in accordance with religious teachings and practices of their choice.

There are no specific religious requirements for membership in the ruling party.

The Government did not designate religion on passports or national identity documents, either explicitly or in code.

The Government prohibited the distribution of religious literature, clothing, and symbols. The International Church of Moroni was allowed to import 10,000 gift boxes in April 2007 provided the boxes did not contain religious literature, symbols, or clothing. In 2006 the organization was prohibited from distributing gift boxes of toys for local children containing cross necklaces. In 2006 authorities on Grande Comores barred the nongovernmental organization (NGO) Who Will Follow Me?, created by the Protestant Church in Moroni, from distributing imported T-shirts emblazoned with the NGO's name in Comoran.

Bans on alcohol and immodest dress are enforced sporadically, usually during religious months, such as Ramadan. Alcohol can be imported and sold with a permit from the Government.

=== Abuses of religious freedom ===
On July 6, 2006, in a general amnesty decreed by President Ahmed Abdallah Sambi in celebration of Independence Day, prisoners were released who had been arrested in the preceding 6 months. Among them were four citizens who were convicted of "evangelizing Muslims" for hosting Christian religious debates in a private residence. There are rarely cases of religious detainees or prisoners. This was the only reported instance where the Government imposed fines, later waived, for unauthorized religious activity. Local police supported the village of Ndruani's decision to chase out the "evangelizers."

=== Forced religious conversion ===
There were no reports of forced religious conversion, including of minor U.S. citizens who had been abducted or illegally removed from the United States, or of the refusal to allow such citizens to be returned to the United States.

== Societal abuses and discrimination ==
There is societal discrimination against non-Muslims, particularly Christians, in some sectors of society. All citizens face societal pressure to practice elements of Islam, particularly during the month of Ramadan. Most societal pressure and discrimination occurs behind closed doors at the village level, far from the eyes of the Government or media. The extent of de facto discrimination typically depends on the level of involvement of local Islamic teachers. Most non-Muslim citizens did not openly practice their faith for fear of societal rejection. Persons who raise their children with non-Muslim religious teachings face societal discrimination. Societal pressure and intimidation continued to restrict the use of the country's three churches to non-citizens.

There is concern that Islamic fundamentalism is increasing as young citizens return to the country following Islamic theological studies abroad and seek to impose a stricter adherence to Islamic religious law on their family members and associates; in response, the Union Government has established a university to give young citizens the option of pursuing university studies in the country.

== See also ==
- Religion in Comoros
- Human rights in Comoros
- Islam in the Comoros
- Christianity in the Comoros
- Roman Catholicism in Comoros
