= Iconi Airport =

Former airport in Moroni, Comoros islands

- IATA: YVA; ICAO: FMCN

Summary
- Airport type: Closed
- Serves: Moroni, Comoros
- Elevation AMSL: 33 ft (10 m)
- Coordinates: 11°42′45″S 43°14′35″E

Map
- Location of the airport in Comoros

Runways
Direction	Length		Surface
Direction	m	ft	Surface
Closed
- Source: GCM Google Maps

Iconi Airport (IATA: YVA, ICAO: FMCN) was an airport located in Moroni, the capital city of the Comoros islands. The airport was on the western side of the island of Grande Comore, north of the town of Iconi.

It was closed in the late 2000s and the runway started being demolished with new structures between 2009 and 2011 in favor of the new Prince Said Ibrahim International Airport.

== Facilities ==
The airport resided at an elevation of 33 feet (10 m) above mean sea level. It had one runway that was 1,355 metres (4,446 ft) in length.

The Iconi non-directional beacon (Ident: FXM) is located just north of the field.

== See also ==
- Transport in Comoros
- List of airports in Comoros
