= Mass media in the Comoros =

As recently as the early 1980s, the Comoros had no national media. State-run Radio Comoros, transmitting from Grand Comore, was not strong enough to send clear signals to the republic's other two islands.

In 1984 France agreed to provide Radio Comoros with funding for an FM (frequency modulation) transmitter strong enough to broadcast to all three islands, and in 1985 made a commitment to fund a national newspaper after a United Nations Educational Scientific and Cultural Organization (UNESCO) study revealed that the Comoros was the only UN member lacking print and electronic media. A state-owned newspaper, Al-Watwan, began operations in July 1985, first as a monthly and soon afterward as a weekly. There are now a number of publications, either daily, such as La Gazette des Comores, or weekly, such as L'Archipel, an independent weekly which began publishing in 1988 and now appears intermittently. Al Balad, a daily published by CGH, is now defunct.

A news agency, Agence Comores Presse, is based in Moroni.

In addition to national broadcasts on FM in Comorian, Swahili and French, Radio Comoros in 1993 broadcast internationally on the shortwave band in Swahili, Arabic, and French, but shortwave services have now been suspended. There are a number independent commercial FM radio stations in the country, Radio Tropique FM, one of the first, began broadcasting in 1991, although it and its director, political activist Ali Bakar Cassim, have occasionally been the object of government ire.

The ORTC (Office de Radio et Télévision des Comores), whose studios were funded by the Chinese government, now broadcasts both radio and television both free to air nationally and by cable and satellite in France.

In 1989 the Comoros had an estimated 61,000 radios and 200 television sets.

== Freedom of Speech ==
Representatives of the independent media have occasionally been rounded up along with other critics of the government during the republic's recurrent bouts of political crisis. However, freedom of speech is generally respected and outlets such as Radio Tropique FM and L'Archipel, which is noted for its satirical column, "Winking Eye", continue to provide independent political commentary.

== See also ==
- Communications in the Comoros
- Telephone numbers in Comoros
