= Telecommunications in the Comoros =

In large part thanks to international aid programs, Moroni has international telecommunications service. Telephone service, however, is largely limited to the islands' few towns.

== Overview ==
Telephones – main lines in use: 5,000 (1995)

Telephones – mobile cellular: 0 (1995)

Telephone system: sparse system of microwave radio relay and HF radiotelephone communication stations
domestic: HF radiotelephone communications and microwave radio relay
CMDA mobile network (Huri, operated by Comores Telecom)
international: HF radiotelephone communications to Madagascar and Réunion

Radio broadcast stations: AM 1, FM 2, shortwave 1 (1998)

Radios: 90,000 (1997)

Television broadcast stations: 0 (1998)

Televisions: 1,000 (1997)

Internet service providers (ISPs): 1 (1999)

Country code (Top-level domain): .km

== Special projects ==
In October 2011, the State of Qatar launched a special program for the construction of a wireless network to interconnect the three islands of the archipelago, by means of low cost, repeatable technology. The project has been developed by Qatar University and Politecnico di Torino, under the supervision of prof. Mazen Hasna and prof. Daniele Trinchero, with a major participation of local actors (Comorian Government, NRTIC, University of the Comoros). The project has been referred as an example of technology transfer and Sustainable Inclusion in developing countries
