= St. Theresa of the Child Jesus Church, Moroni =

Church in Moroni, Comoros Islands

Coordinates: 11.70862°S 43.25287°E

St. Theresa of the Child Jesus Church
- Église de Sainte Thérèse de l’Enfant Jésus
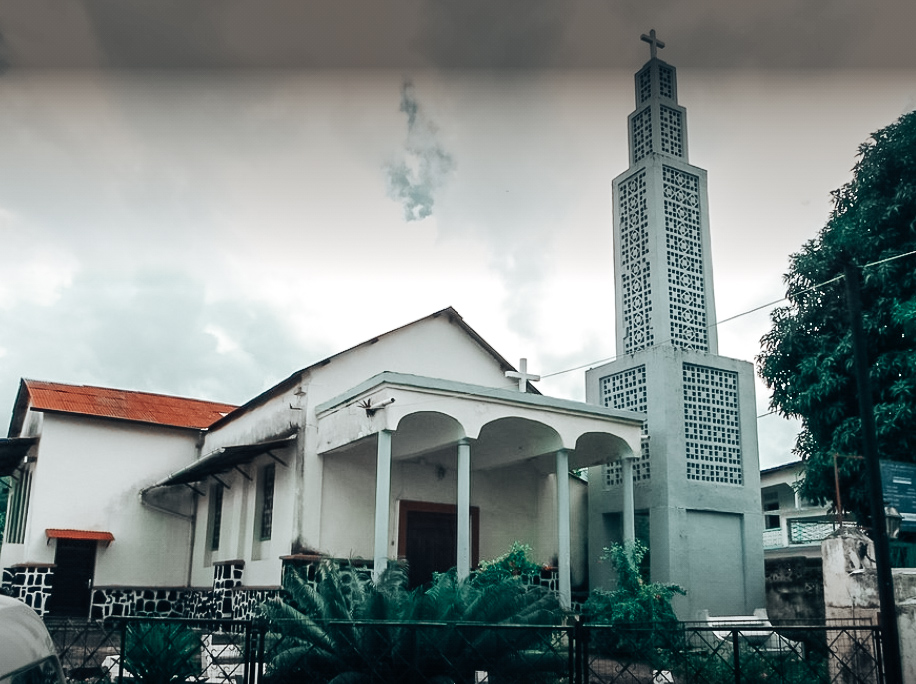
- St. Theresa of the Child Jesus Church
- Location: Moroni
- Country: Comoros
- Denomination: Roman Catholic Church

The St. Theresa of the Child Jesus Church (French: Église de Sainte Thérèse de l’Enfant Jésus) is a religious building affiliated with the Roman Catholic Church and located in the city of Moroni, the capital of the archipelago and nation of Comoros in the Indian Ocean.

It is the main church in the Islamic majority island group. The other two Catholic churches are in neighboring Mayotte, which is part of the same archipelago but is an overseas department of France.

The church follows the Roman Catholic or Latin rite and is under the jurisdiction of the Vicariate of the Comoros Islands (Apostolicus Vicariatus Insularum Comorensium or Vicariat apostolique de l'archipel des Comores) which gained its current status under the pontificate of Pope Benedict XVI by the bull Divini Salvatoris of 2010.

It is named for St. Therese of the Child Jesus (sœur Thérèse de l’Enfant-Jésus et de la Sainte-Face), a French Discalced Carmelite declared a saint in 1925 and proclaimed Doctor of the Church in 1997 by Pope John Paul II.

== See also ==
- Roman Catholicism in Comoros
- St. Theresa of the Child Jesus
