= Catholic Church in the Comoros =

The Catholic Church in the Comoros is part of the worldwide Catholic Church, under the spiritual leadership of the Pope in Rome.

There are very few Catholics in this overwhelmingly Islamic country - 0.3% of the total population in 2020.

No dioceses have been established, but the whole of the country forms the Apostolic Vicariate of the Comoros Archipelago.

There is a Roman Catholic church in Moroni on Grande Comore island. Another Roman Catholic church is in Mutsamudu. There is also a Protestant church in Moroni.

== See also ==
- St. Theresa of the Child Jesus Church, Moroni
- Religion in Comoros
- Christianity in Comoros
- Freedom of religion in the Comoros
