= List of airports in the Comoros =

This is a list of airports in the Comoros, sorted by location.

== List ==
Location	ICAO	IATA	Airport name
Anjouan	FMCV	AJN	Ouani Airport
Mohéli	FMCI	NWA	Mohéli Bandar Es Eslam Airport
Moroni	FMCN	YVA	Iconi Airport - closed
Moroni	FMCH	HAH	Prince Said Ibrahim International Airport

== See also ==
- Transport in Comoros
- List of airports by ICAO code: F#Comoros
- Wikipedia: WikiProject Aviation/Airline destination lists: Africa#Comoros
