= Mining industry of the Comoros =

As of 2006, the mineral industry of continued to be limited to the production of such construction materials as clay, sand and gravel, and crushed stone for local consumption. Mineral production data continued to be unavailable as of 2006. The Comoros did not play a significant role in the world's production or consumption of minerals.

The demand for cement, steel, and petroleum products was met through imports. In 2005, imports of petroleum products accounted for 12% of total imports; cement, 8%; and iron and steel, nearly 4%. Imports of cement amounted to 55,867 metric tons (t); petroleum products, 20,487 t; and iron and steel, 3,678 t.
