= Religion in the Comoros =

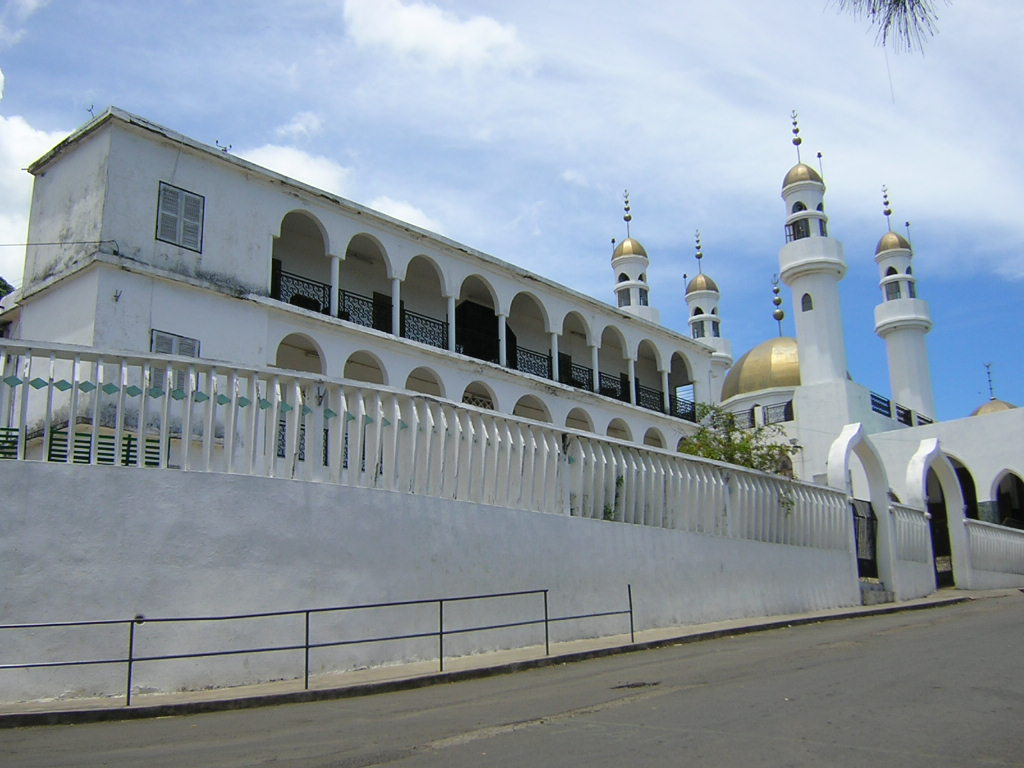
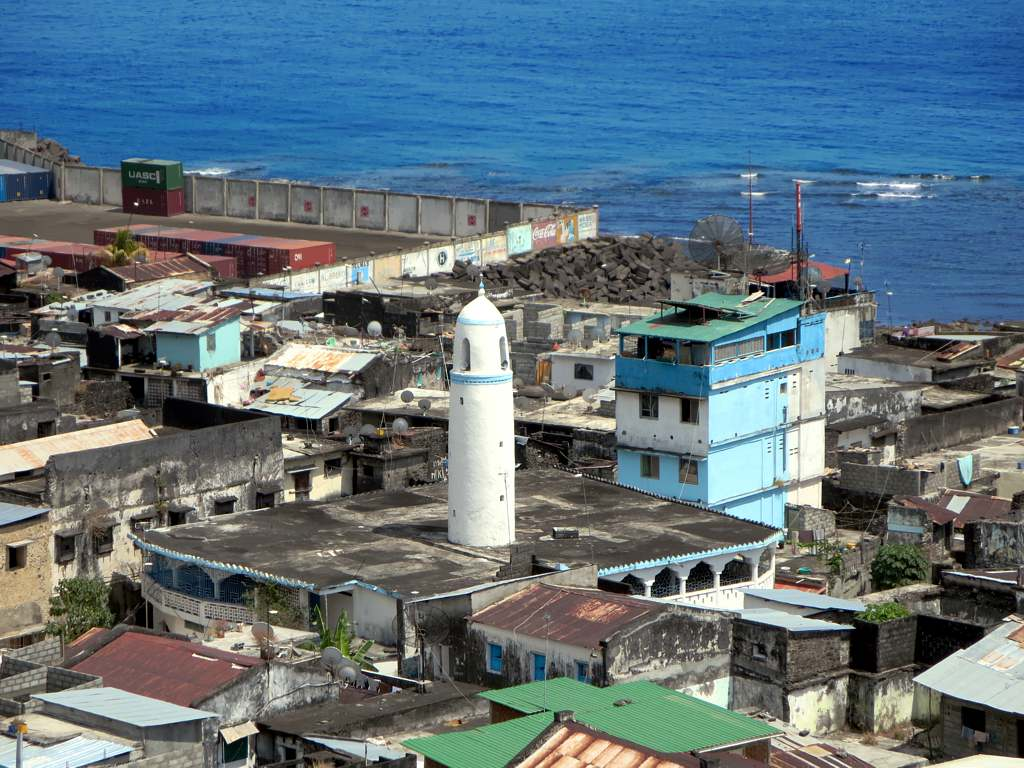
A mosque in Moroni, Comoros (left), and in Mutsamudu.

The predominant religion in Comoros is Islam, with a small Christian minority. Although the constitution, as revised in 2018, removed the reference to a state religion in the 2009 constitution, stating simply that Sunni Islam is the source of national identity, a 2008 law promulgated in January 2013 outlawed the practice of other forms of Islam in the country. Propagation of non-Islamic religions is prohibited.

== Overview ==
Islam is followed by over 98% of nearly 800,000 Comorians, almost all of whom belong to the Shafi'i madhhab of Sunni Islam. Following a 1999 military coup, the new constitution of Comoros that was ratified in December 2001 provided for "the equality of all concerning rights and duties without distinctions based on sex, origin, race, religion or belief". The Article 41 of the new constitution also set up the Council of Ulemas (Islamic scholars) to assist the Government of Comoros in their decisions affecting the religious life in Comoros. The Comoros' constitution states that the "Islamic nature of the state" can not be changed, and makes Islamic law binding on all citizens of Comoros.

Abandoning Islam and converting to another religion is a crime, and like in Mauritania, Saudi Arabia and Iran, this can lead to capital punishment. The study of Islamic scriptures is mandatory in public schools, even for children of those who are not Muslims; however, the minorities have a right to operate their own school without the use of Islamic scriptures.

== Islam ==
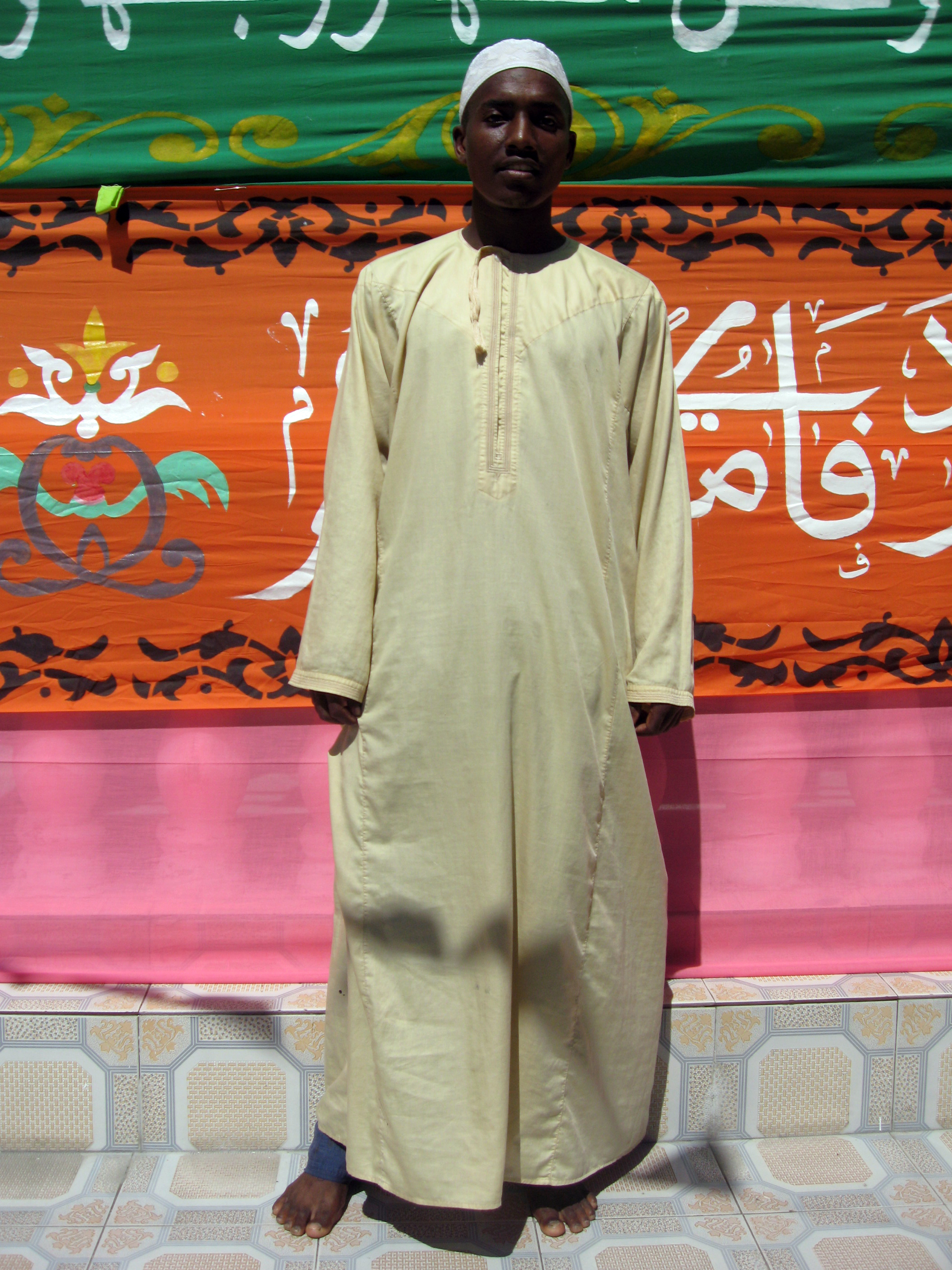
A Comorian in traditional Muslim dress.

According to local legend, Islam was brought to Comoros in the 7th century by Mtswa Mwindza, ruler of Mbude on Ngazidja, and Muhammad ibn Uthman, son of Uthman ibn Affan. Their tombs are to be found in Ntsaweni, capital of Mbude.

The overwhelming majority of the population in the Comoros are Sunni Muslims. Islam and its institutions have helped to integrate Comorian society and provide identification with a world beyond the islands' shores. Most adherents are of Arab, African or Malagasy origin, but there are also people of Indian and European descent.

Comorians follow religious observances conscientiously and strictly adhere to religious orthodoxy. During colonization, the French did not attempt to supplant Islamic practices and were careful to respect the precedents of sharia as interpreted by the Shafi'i school of thought. All Muslim holidays are observed, including Id al-Adha, Muharram, Ashura, Mawlid, Laylat al-Mi'raj and Ramadan. Mawlid is marked by celebrations culminating in a feast prepared for the ulama. Comorians often consult mwalimus or fundi for healing and protection from jinn.

== Christianity ==
In 2009, approximately 2% of the Comoros population practiced Christianity; these are generally Roman Catholics. In 2020, the figure was 0.5%.

Proselytizing of Christianity or any other non-Islamic religion is prohibited.

== See also ==
- Islam in Comoros
- Christianity in Comoros
- Roman Catholicism in Comoros
- Freedom of religion in the Comoros
