= LGBTQ rights in the Comoros =

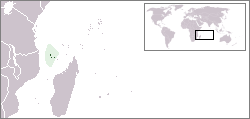
- The Comoros
- Legal status: Illegal
- Penalty: 2 years imprisonment, and a fine
- Gender identity: No
- Military: No
- Discrimination protections: No

Family rights
- Recognition of relationships: No recognition of same-sex unions
- Adoption: No

Lesbian, gay, bisexual, transgender and queer (LGBTQ) people in the Comoros face legal challenges not experienced by non-LGBTQ residents. LGBTQ persons are regularly prosecuted by the government and additionally face stigmatization among the broader population.

== Law regarding LGBTQ topics ==
Both male and female same-sex sexual acts are illegal in the Comoros. Article 300 of the 2020 Penal Code establishes that "Any act of a sexual nature contrary to morality or unnatural shall be punished with a sentence of six months to two years and a fine of 100,000 to 300,000 francs." Previously, the 1982 Penal Code established that such acts were punished with up to five years imprisonment and a fine of 50,000 to 1,000,000 francs. The government has repeatedly refused to decriminalize homosexuality when advised to by bodies of the United Nations.

Transgender people are not allowed to change their gender markers. There are no LGBTQ+ organizations in the country, and such organizations could potentially prosecuted under Article 5 of Law No. 86-006/AF (1986) which prohibits organizations founded on an "unlawful cause or for an unlawful purpose, contrary to the law or public morals."

=== Enforcement against same-sex relationships ===
The first case of the 2020 Penal Code being used to prosecute consentual same-sex sexual activity between adults was in 2022. A man was prosecuted after a sexual video of him with another man was leaked online. In 2024, two women were sentenced to five and six months in prison respectively after being convicted for homosexuality. The women were detained after allegedly asking an imam to marry them. This was not proven in court, but the women said they had previously engaged in sexual activity together. They were then detained from June until the final ruling in December. The sentence was shorter than their detainment period, so the women were released after the ruling.

== Recognition of same-sex relationships ==
There is no recognition of legal rights for same-sex couples. The Family Code (French: Code de la Famille) establishes that marriage is the union of a man and a woman. It says, "The family considered in this code is the social structure composed of a man and a woman united by marriage with or without children."

== Discrimination protections ==
There is no legal protection against discrimination based on sexual orientation or gender identity. The Labor Code (2012) does not provide protections for LGBTQ people. There are no laws protecting intersex people from non-consentual surgery to make their bodies fit into expected male and female norms.

== Living conditions ==
The U.S. Department of State's 2010 Human Rights Report found that "persons engaging in homosexual activity did not publicly discuss their sexual orientation due to societal pressure. There are no lesbian, gay, bisexual, and transgender organizations in the country." As of 2023, most LGBTQ+ people do not disclose their sexual orientation or gender identity.

The Comoros is a majority Muslim country, and religion is a major influence on how society views same-sex relationships. Additionally, homosexuality is seen as being against African culture. LGBTQ+ people in the country face cultural discrimination as well as discrimination while seeking education and employment opportunities. Some LGBTQ+ people are ostracized from their homes, neighborhoods, and villages. According to Gallup, 26 percent of people in Comoros responded that the area they lived would be a good place for LGBTQ+ people in 2023; this was a 10 percent increase from the previous year.

== Summary table ==
Same-sex sexual activity legal	No (Penalty: 2 years imprisonment and/or fine)
Equal age of consent	No
Anti-discrimination laws in employment only	No
Anti-discrimination laws in the provision of goods and services	No
Anti-discrimination laws in all other areas (incl. indirect discrimination, hate speech)	No
Same-sex marriages	No
Recognition of same-sex couples	No
Step-child adoption by same-sex couples	No
Joint adoption by same-sex couples	No
LGBTQ people allowed to serve openly in the military	No
Right to change legal gender	No
Access to IVF for lesbians	No
Commercial surrogacy for gay male couples	No
MSMs allowed to donate blood	No

== See also ==
- Human rights in Comoros
- LGBTQ rights in Africa
