= Comorian cuisine =

Culinary traditions of the Comoros

Comorian cuisine refers not only to dishes from the independent Indian Ocean nation of the Comoros but also those of the French overseas department of Mayotte in the same archipelago.

The cuisine reflects the many groups and cultures who have visited and settled the islands over the centuries, including not only Swahili- and Austronesian-speaking peoples but also those with origins in the Middle East (especially Oman and present-day Iran), India, Portugal, and France (the latter of which administered the Comoros until 1975 and still oversees Mayotte).

Many species of fish (particularly tuna and cod) and crustaceans such as crab and lobster are consumed in Comorian soups and stews, often in conjunction with root crops like cassava and green (unripe) banana. Examples of dishes of this type include roti ya houma pampa (dried salt cod rehydrated and slowly simmered in a rougail (sauce) of onion and tomato) and m'tsolola (firm-fleshed fish such as swordfish cooked with plantains and spinach or native greens like matava (cassava leaves) in coconut milk). In recent decades, French-influenced seafood dishes (such as langouste à la vanille, small lobsters in vanilla sauce) have also become popular, especially on Mayotte.

Meals centered around meats such as beef and chicken are also eaten in the Comoros. A prominent example, mshakiki (marinated skewered beef) bears strong similarities to mishkaki from Kenya and Tanzania. Akoho sy voanio or poulet au coco originates in Madagascar and consists of chicken cooked in coconut cream. (Coconuts, termed nazi in some Comorian languages, are utilized in a wide range of dishes from the archipelago.) Popular accompaniments to these dishes include achard aux legumes (tangy pickled lemon or green mango) and pilaou (fragrant rice pilaf originating in the nearby Zanzibar Archipelago).

Mkatra siniya (Comorian spice cake), shihondro (caramelized peanut candy) and ladu (cashew/rice balls with a hint of black pepper) are a few examples of desserts eaten in the islands.

In the Comoros, the term thé (tea) often refers to tisanes or infusions of native herbs like mani ya mdarassini (cinnamon leaves) and mani ya sandze (lemongrass) rather than tea-based drinks themselves. Juices like jackfruit, papaya, and mango are also commonly consumed. Although alcoholic beverages are available in certain parts of the country (notably the large Volo-Volo market in the national capital Moroni), the public consumption of alcohol is generally frowned upon in the islands as over 95 % of the population are devout Sunni Muslims. Blood and pork consumption is also illegal in the country.
