= Ministry of Justice (Comoros) =

The Ministry of Justice, Islamic Affairs, Public Administration and Human Rights handles any legal reforms that might improve the justice system of Comoros. The Union government forces include the Army of National Development and the gendarmerie. When the latter force serves as the judicial police, it reports to the Minister of Justice. Although National Commission for Preventing and Fighting Corruption (CNPLC) exists to prevent corruption, the Ministry of Justice seldom prosecutes corruption cases.

== List of ministers ==
- Abdellahi Mohamed (1979) [referred to as the Minister of Justice, Muslim Affairs, Transports, Tourism & External Commerce]
- Abderemane Mohame (1980-1982) [referred to as the Minister of Justice, Information, Public Health & Population]
- Said Mohamed Said Turqui (1983) [referred to as the Minister of Justice, Information, Public Health & Population]
- Mohamed Moumine (1984) [referred to as the Minister of Justice in Charge of the Civil Service, Labor & Social Laws]
- Ali Hasan Ali (1985) [referred to as the Minister of Justice & Health]
- Ben Ali Bacar (1986-1990) [referred to as theMinister of Justice, Public Relations & Employment / Minister of Justice, Employment & Professional Training & Manpower]
- Said Attoumane (1991) [referred to as the Minister of Justice, Employment & Professional Training]
- Djamal Eddine Salim (1992) [referred to as the Minister of Justice and Employment]
- Caabi Roubali (1993) [referred to as the Minister of Justice, Civil Service & Employment]
- Maoulida Ibrahim (1994)
- Fateh Sound Mohamed (1995)
- Soilih Hassani (1996) [referred to as the Minister of Justice & Islamic Affairs]
- Ali Ben Ali (1997) [referred to as the Minister of Justice & Internal Muslim Affairs]
- Said Ali Yussuf (1998) [referred to as the Commissioner of Justice]
- Mohamed Abdou Mmadi (1999) [referred to as the Minister of Justice, Public Function, Employment, Professional Training, Administrative Decentralization & Constitutional Reforms]
- Milisaani Hamdia (2000) [referred to as the Minister of Justice & Islamic Affairs]
- Abdoulbar Youssouf (2001)
- Yahaya Mohamed Iliasse (2001)
- Rachid ben Massoundi (2004-2006) [referred to as the Minister of Justice, Information, Religious Affairs, Human Rights and Parliamentary Affairs]
- Mourad Said Ibrahim (2007-2008)
- M'madi Ali (2007-2009)
- Miftah Ali Bamba (2010)
- Jafar Ahmed Moinsoib (2010-2011)
- Ahmed Anliane (2011-2013)
- Abdou Housseni (2013-2015) [referred to as the Minister of Justice, Civil Service, Administrative Reform, the Human Rights and Islamic Affairs]
- Mohamed El-Had Abbas (2016)
- Fahmi Said Ibrahim (2016-2017)
- Moussa Mahoma (2017–present)

== See also ==
- Justice ministry
- Politics of the Comoros
