= History of rail transport in the Comoros =

The history of rail transport in the Comoros began in about 1907. The only railway to be built in the Comoros was a 600 mm (1 ft 11 5/8 in) narrow gauge industrial railway. Its owner was a plantation society, the Société Comores Bambaoa. The railway carried only freight traffic. It is not known when the railway was abandoned.

== See also ==
- History of rail transport
- History of the Comoros
- Transport in the Comoros
