= Daniele Trinchero =

Italian engineer and inventor (born 1968)

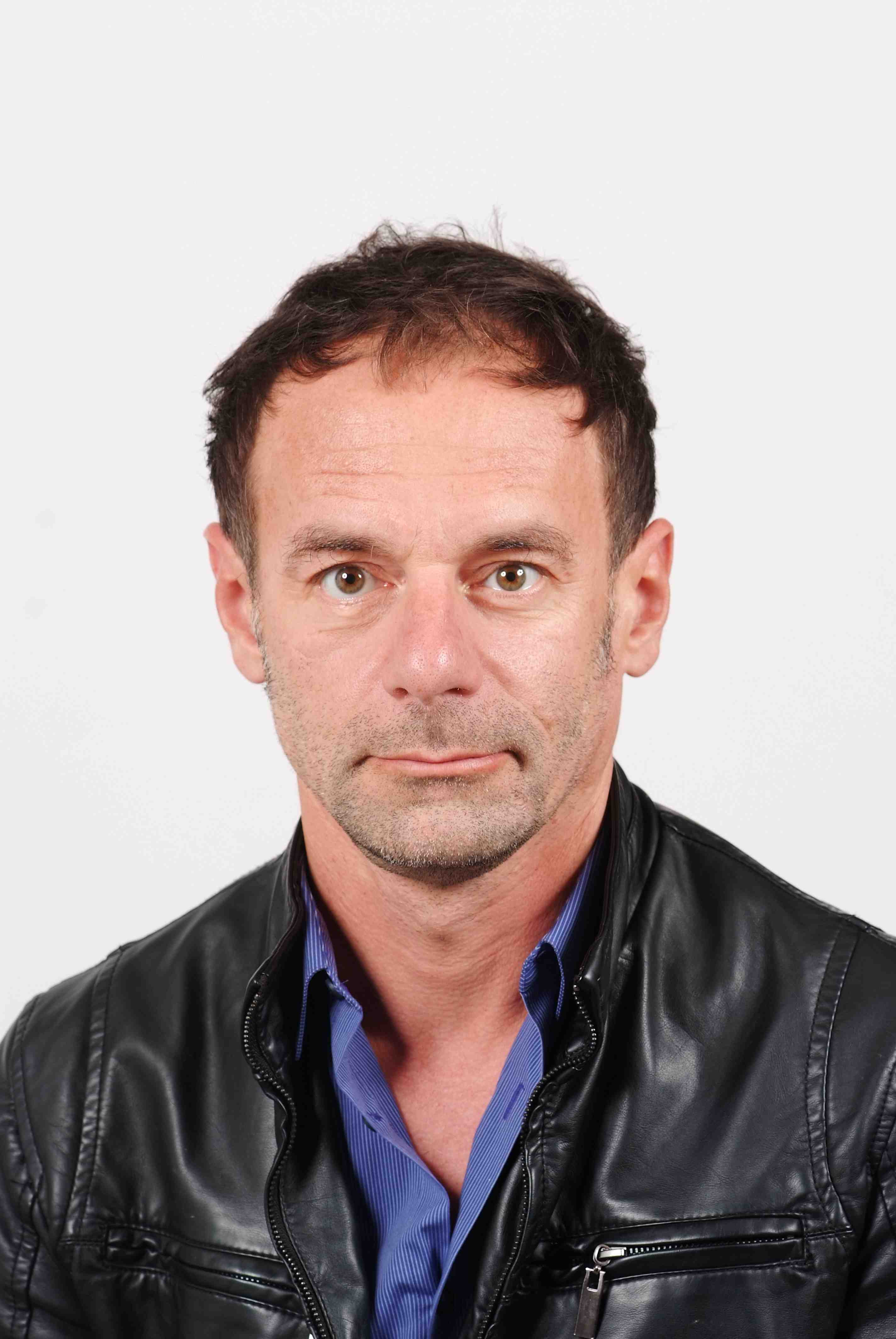
- Trinchero at the time of Comoros Island project presentation
- Born: 23 December 1968 (age 57); Turin, Italy
- Education: Polytechnic University of Turin
- Known for: Wireless Networks and Wireless Sensor Networks Research
- Scientific career
- Fields: Engineering

Daniele Trinchero (born 23 December 1968) is an Italian engineer and inventor. In late 2004, together with Riccardo Stefanelli, he founded the iXem Labs to develop new wireless technologies for applications in Environmental Monitoring and Social Development at the Polytechnic University of Turin.

== Life and career ==
Daniele Trinchero received the Laurea degree in electronic engineering and Ph.D. degree in electronic and telecommunication engineering from the Polytechnic University of Turin, Turin, Italy, in 1993 and 1997, respectively. In 1996–1997 he was with the Italian National Council of Research (CNR) in Turin. In 1996, he visited Loughborough University, Loughborough, United Kingdom. Since December 1997, he has been with the Electronics Department, Polytechnic University of Turin, where in December 2004, he founded the iXem Labs, and since then, has been responsible for them. In 2010 and 2011 he visited the College of Engineering, Qatar University, Doha, Qatar. He then assisted the department in providing instruction in courses in Electromagnetics in Spring 2014.

With the Polytechnic University of Turin, he has been teaching courses about radio communications, radio planning, Internet of Things, basic electromagnetic theory, electromagnetic compatibility, and electromagnetic field measurements. Starting from 2011, he has started experiencing innovative teaching methods involving the use of social networks and direct student participation to the teaching activity. One of these experiments has been selected as a best practice by the "European Competition for Best Innovations in University Outreach and Public Engagement" organized in early 2012 by the Oxford Internet Institute.

His major field of study is related to electromagnetic field propagation applied to the design of wireless components and networks. His research interests include wireless sensor networks, geographical wireless networks, long-distance communications, sensing technology, antennas, electromagnetic field propagation, electromagnetic field measurements, electromagnetic compatibility, microwave devices, frequency-selective surfaces, shielding devices, and telecommunication solutions for digital inclusion of developing regions.

== Internet for Peace Campaign ==
In 2010 Trinchero was chosen by the magazine Wired Italia as one of the twelve testimonials to support the candidature of Internet for the Nobel Prize. The proposal is based on the idea that "the Internet is a powerful tool for democracy enhancement and preservation. Global communication through the Internet is the most effective means to overcome political and military barriers, to spread knowledge and to affirm the culture of collaboration and sharing", as Riccardo Luna says.

The campaign has been supported by Riccardo Luna's book "Internet è un Dono di Dio", which dedicates a chapter to Daniele Trinchero's activity to break digital isolation in South America and Africa, and Wired Italia, which dedicated a section of the March 2010 Issue to Daniele Trinchero, referred since then as "Mr. Wireless". The Internet for Peace website, internetforpeace.org, contains all the details of the project together with the list of the "Ambassadors".

== Water Waste Reduction ==
Trinchero has conceived an application based on the use of Mobile Wireless Sensor Networks to improve water leakage reduction. This innovative wireless network architecture is based on the use of mobile sensors able to flow free of any anchorage through underground pipes, to detect physical parameters of the medium and to transmit the information to the surface. This activity has already led to a patent, filed together by the Polytechnic University of Turin, Qatar University and QU Wireless Research Cente. The device takes the name WaterMOLE and represents and innovative solution to detect, by application of radio techniques, fluid leakages in water and gas distribution infrastructures.

In 2010 Daniele Trinchero was assigned with one of the Best Author Award by the International Telecommunication Union (ITU) for a paper presenting his last research developments in the field at the Workshop “ICTs: Building the green city of the future” held at the Shanghai International Expo.
