= Health in the Comoros =

The Comoros continues to face public health problems characteristic of developing countries. After Comoros's independence in 1975, the French withdrew their medical teams, leaving the three islands' already rudimentary health care system in a state of severe crisis. French assistance was eventually resumed, and other nations also contributed medical assistance to the young republic.

The Human Rights Measurement Initiative finds that Comoros is fulfilling 64.2% of what it should be fulfilling for the right to health based on its level of income. When looking at the right to health with respect to children, Comoros achieves 86.7% of what is expected based on its current income. Regarding the right to health amongst the adult population, the country achieves only 84.1% of what is expected based on the nation's level of income. Comoros falls into the "very bad" category when evaluating the right to reproductive health because the nation is fulfilling only 21.6% of what the nation is expected to achieve based on the resources (income) it has available.

== Maternal and child health care ==
The 2010 maternal mortality rate per 100,000 births for the Comoros is 340. This is compared with 225.3 in 2008 and 449.9 in 1990. The under 5 mortality rate, per 1,000 births, is 105, and the neonatal mortality as a percentage of under 5's mortality is 35. In the Comoros, the number of midwives per 1,000 live births is 9, and the lifetime risk of death for pregnant women is 1 in 71.

Life expectancy at birth was estimated at fifty-six years in 1990, up from fifty-one years in 1980. The crude birthrate was forty-eight per 1,000, and the crude death rate, twelve per 1,000, according to 1989 statistics. All three of these figures were close to the averages for sub-Saharan Africa. The rate of infant mortality per 1,000 live births was eighty-nine in 1991, down from 113 in 1980. The 1990 average rate for sub-Saharan Africa was 107.

=== Abortion ===
Article 304 of the penal code of the Comoros bans abortion, punishing providers with a prison sentence of one to five years and a fine of 15,000 to 100,000 francs. Women who receive illegal abortions may also be punished. The only legal grounds for abortion are "very serious medical reasons, noted in writing by at least two doctors". The requirement for two doctors' approval may be waived if only one doctor is available. The law does not set a gestational limit.

The original abortion law of the Comoros was based on that of France, only permitting abortion on the grounds of risk to life. The wording of the 1939 amendment to France's abortion law remains in the Comoros' law. The penal code adopted in 1982 added the ground for "serious medical reasons". The Comoros was one of the first ten countries to sign the Maputo Protocol, which includes a right to abortion.

In 2015–2019, the rate of unintended pregnancies was 95 per 1,000 women of reproductive age. During this period, there were 6,100 abortions per year, a rate of 31 per 1,000 women. The abortion rate had remained constant since 1990–1994, while the rate of unintended pregnancies had decreased by 35%. According to a 2021 study, women in the Comoros who have experienced intimate partner violence are more likely to have abortions. The lack of legal abortion and the high rates of sexual assault are factors that lead women to commit infanticide, which cases are commonly reported in the country.

== Disease ==
Malaria was ubiquitous in the islands, with 80 to 90 percent of the population said to be affected by the disease. Other prevalent maladies included tuberculosis, leprosy, and parasitic diseases. In 1989, about half of all children one year old or younger had been immunized against tuberculosis, diphtheria, pertussis, tetanus, polio, and measles, a proportion roughly comparable to the rate of immunization among other states in sub-Saharan Africa.

Per capita daily caloric intake in 1988 was 2,046, about average for sub-Saharan Africa but only a little better than 90 percent of daily requirements. Children were most often the victims of malnutrition. Their generally poor diets were deficient in protein in part because local custom discouraged the feeding of fish to children. The scarcity of safe drinking water—available to about one in three Comorans—made intestinal parasites a problem and compounded malnutrition, with children again being the main victims.

The World Bank estimated that in 1993 the Comoros had one physician per 6,582 Comorans, a marked improvement over the ratio of one to 13,810 reported in 1983. Comparable data for sub-Saharan Africa as a whole were not available; however, it appeared that Comorans enjoyed a more favorable ratio than many of their neighbors in East Africa and the Indian Ocean.

Despite improvements in life expectancy, infant mortality, and the number of physicians, the overall quality of care remained poor. About 80 percent of the population lives within one hour's walk of a health facility, usually headed by a trained nurse, but paramedical staff are in short supply and many health facilities are in poor condition. Some international medical aid has been provided, mostly by France and the World Health Organization (WHO).

Although the Comoros lacks homegrown narcotics, the islands are used as a transit site for drugs coming mainly from Madagascar. In view of international concern about drug trafficking, in 1993 France began providing technical expertise in this field to the Comoros. In addition, the World Bank in a 1994 report pointed out the "high prevalence of sexually transmitted diseases and the low use of condoms" as a significant health threat with regard to the spread of acquired immune deficiency syndrome (AIDS), which already affected the islands. However, in the period prior to 1990 and extending through 1992, the WHO reported that the Comoros had a very low incidence of AIDS—a total of three cases with no case reported in 1992, or an overall case rate of 0.1 per 100,000 population.

== Healthcare ==
In 2006, there were 15 physicians per 100,000 people. The fertility rate was 4.7 per adult woman in 2004. Life expectancy at birth is 67 for females and 62 for males. By 2012 the life expectancy at birth was 62 years.

There are two district, two provincial and one regional hospitals in Comoros. These hospitals are supplemented by 52 health posts and 12 health centers.

The hospitals include the following:

- El-Maarouf National Hospital Center, Moroni, Grand Comore, established in 1954
- Regional Hospital Foumbouni, Foumbouni, Grand Comore
- Regional Hospital Mitsamiouli, Mitsamiouli, Grand Comore
- Caritas Hospital, Moroni, Grand Comore
- Hospital of Moidja Hamahamet, Mouadja, Grand Comore
- Hospital of Nioumamilima Badjini, Nioumamilima, Grand Comore
- Samba-Kouni Hospital Center, Samba-Kouni, Grand Comore
- Mkazi Health Post, Mkazi, Grand Comore
- Tsinimoichongo Health Post, Tsinimoichongo, Grand Comore
- Hospital Center Ouani, Ouani, Anjouan
- Hospital of Domoni, Domoni, Anjouan
- Mutsamudu Hospital, Mutsamudu, Anjouan
- Regional Hospital Center of Djando, Wanani, Mohéli
- International Hospital, Moroni, Grand Comore
- Nioumachoua Health Center, Nioumachoua, Mohéli
