= Human rights in the Comoros =

Historically, Comoros has had a relatively poor human rights record. According to the Freedom in the World report of 2025, the country is rated as "Partly free" with an overall score of 42/100 between its measured Political Rights and Civil Liberties.

== Historical situation ==
In early 1979, Comorian authorities arrested some 300 supporters of the Soilih's regime and imprisoned them without trial in Moroni. Four of Soilih's former ministers also disappeared. For the next two years, there were further arrests, shootings, and disappearances. Under pressure from France, some trials were held but many Comorians remained political prisoners, despite protests from Amnesty International and other humanitarian organizations. The Abdallah regime also restricted freedom of speech, press, association, citizens' rights to change their government, women's rights, and workers' rights. After Abdallah's death on November 27, 1989, the country's human rights record improved. The European mercenaries who ruled the island ordered only a few arrests and released nearly all political prisoners who had been detained after the 1985 and 1987 coup attempts.

This trend continued until March 1990, when Djohar became president of Comoros. Opposition to his regime resulted in questionable human rights practices. For example, after an unsuccessful August 18–19, 1990 coup attempt, the authorities detained twenty-four people without trial in connection with the uprising. In October 1990, the security forces killed Max Veillard, the leader of the conspirators. The following year, after efforts to remove him from the presidency for negligence failed, Djohar ordered the arrest of several Supreme Court judges and declared a state of emergency. Another failed coup attempt on September 26, 1992, prompted the authorities to detain more than twenty people, including former Minister of Interior Omar Tamou. Police held these detainees incommunicado and reportedly tortured some of them. The Comorian Human Rights Association also accused the Djohar regime of extrajudicially executing individuals suspected of supporting armed opposition groups. By late 1993, groups such as Amnesty International continued to monitor the human rights situation in Comoros, and to speak out against the Djohar regime.

In 2018, the ruling President Azali Assoumani (who has been in power continuously, bar the 2006-2016 decade, ever since he staged a coup d'état in 1999), held a controversial referendum which he used to consolidate his power. The opponents of the referendum were actively persecuted. According to the 2025 Freedom in the World report, violence also broke out after the initial results of the 2019 elections were published (in favour of Assoumani), whereby citizens reported several human rights abuses to have happened.

== Indicators ==
The following chart shows Comoros's ratings since 1975 in the Freedom in the World reports, published annually by Freedom House. A rating of 1 is "free"; 7, "not free".^{1}

Historical ratings

| Year | Political Rights | Civil Liberties | Status | President^{2} |
| 1975 | 5 | 2 | Partly Free | Ahmed Abdallah |
| 1976 | 5 | 3 | Partly Free | Said Mohamed Jaffar |
| 1977 | 4 | 4 | Partly Free | Ali Soilih |
| 1978 | 5 | 4 | Partly Free | Ali Soilih |
| 1979 | 4 | 5 | Partly Free | Ahmed Abdallah |
| 1980 | 4 | 5 | Partly Free | Ahmed Abdallah |
| 1981 | 4 | 5 | Partly Free | Ahmed Abdallah |
| 1982^{3} | 4 | 5 | Partly Free | Ahmed Abdallah |
| 1983 | 4 | 4 | Partly Free | Ahmed Abdallah |
| 1984 | 5 | 5 | Partly Free | Ahmed Abdallah |
| 1985 | 6 | 6 | Not Free | Ahmed Abdallah |
| 1986 | 6 | 6 | Not Free | Ahmed Abdallah |
| 1987 | 6 | 6 | Not Free | Ahmed Abdallah |
| 1988 | 6 | 6 | Not Free | Ahmed Abdallah |
| 1989 | 6 | 5 | Not Free | Ahmed Abdallah |
| 1990 | 5 | 5 | Partly Free | Said Mohamed Djohar |
| 1991 | 4 | 3 | Partly Free | Said Mohamed Djohar |
| 1992 | 4 | 2 | Partly Free | Said Mohamed Djohar |
| 1993 | 4 | 4 | Partly Free | Said Mohamed Djohar |
| 1994 | 4 | 4 | Partly Free | Said Mohamed Djohar |
| 1995 | 4 | 4 | Partly Free | Said Mohamed Djohar |
| 1996 | 4 | 4 | Partly Free | Caabi El-Yachroutu Mohamed |
| 1997 | 5 | 4 | Partly Free | Mohamed Taki Abdoulkarim |
| 1998 | 5 | 4 | Partly Free | Mohamed Taki Abdoulkarim |
| 1999 | 6 | 4 | Partly Free | Tadjidine Ben Said Massounde |
| 2000 | 6 | 4 | Partly Free | Azali Assoumani |
| 2001 | 6 | 4 | Partly Free | Azali Assoumani |
| 2002 | 5 | 4 | Partly Free | Azali Assoumani |
| 2003 | 5 | 4 | Partly Free | Azali Assoumani |
| 2004 | 4 | 4 | Partly Free | Azali Assoumani |
| 2005 | 4 | 4 | Partly Free | Azali Assoumani |
| 2006 | 3 | 4 | Partly Free | Azali Assoumani |
| 2007 | 4 | 4 | Partly Free | Ahmed Abdallah Mohamed Sambi |
| 2008 | 3 | 4 | Partly Free | Ahmed Abdallah Mohamed Sambi |
| 2009 | 3 | 4 | Partly Free | Ahmed Abdallah Mohamed Sambi |
| 2010 | 3 | 4 | Partly Free | Ahmed Abdallah Mohamed Sambi |
| 2011 | 3 | 4 | Partly Free | Ahmed Abdallah Mohamed Sambi |
| 2012 | 3 | 4 | Partly Free | Ikililou Dhoinine |
| 2013 | 3 | 4 | Partly Free | Ikililou Dhoinine |
| 2014 | 3 | 4 | Partly Free | Ikililou Dhoinine |
| 2015 | 3 | 4 | Partly Free | Ikililou Dhoinine |
| 2016 | 3 | 4 | Partly Free | Ikililou Dhoinine |
| 2017 | 3 | 4 | Partly Free | Azali Assoumani |
| 2018 | 4 | 4 | Partly Free | Azali Assoumani |
| 2019 | 4 | 4 | Partly Free | Azali Assoumani |
| 2020 | 5 | 4 | Partly Free | Azali Assoumani |
| 2021 | 5 | 4 | Partly Free | Azali Assoumani |
| 2022 | 5 | 4 | Partly Free | Azali Assoumani |
| 2023 | 5 | 4 | Partly Free | Azali Assoumani |

== International treaties ==
Comoros's stances on international human rights treaties are as follows:

International treaties

| Treaty | Organization | Introduced | Signed | Ratified |
| Convention on the Prevention and Punishment of the Crime of Genocide | United Nations | 1948 | - | 2004 |
| International Convention on the Elimination of All Forms of Racial Discrimination | United Nations | 1966 | 2000 | 2004 |
| International Covenant on Economic, Social and Cultural Rights | United Nations | 1966 | 2008 | - |
| International Covenant on Civil and Political Rights | United Nations | 1966 | 2008 | - |
| First Optional Protocol to the International Covenant on Civil and Political Rights | United Nations | 1966 | - | - |
| Convention on the Non-Applicability of Statutory Limitations to War Crimes and Crimes Against Humanity | United Nations | 1968 | - | - |
| International Convention on the Suppression and Punishment of the Crime of Apartheid | United Nations | 1973 | - | - |
| Convention on the Elimination of All Forms of Discrimination against Women | United Nations | 1979 | - | 1994 |
| Convention against Torture and Other Cruel, Inhuman or Degrading Treatment or Punishment | United Nations | 1984 | 2000 | - |
| Convention on the Rights of the Child | United Nations | 1989 | 1990 | 1993 |
| Second Optional Protocol to the International Covenant on Civil and Political Rights, aiming at the abolition of the death penalty | United Nations | 1989 | - | - |
| International Convention on the Protection of the Rights of All Migrant Workers and Members of Their Families | United Nations | 1990 | 2000 | - |
| Optional Protocol to the Convention on the Elimination of All Forms of Discrimination against Women | United Nations | 1999 | - | - |
| Optional Protocol to the Convention on the Rights of the Child on the Involvement of Children in Armed Conflict | United Nations | 2000 | - | - |
| Optional Protocol to the Convention on the Rights of the Child on the Sale of Children, Child Prostitution and Child Pornography | United Nations | 2000 | - | 2007 |
| Convention on the Rights of Persons with Disabilities | United Nations | 2006 | - | - |
| Optional Protocol to the Convention on the Rights of Persons with Disabilities | United Nations | 2006 | - | - |
| International Convention for the Protection of All Persons from Enforced Disappearance | United Nations | 2006 | 2007 | - |
| Optional Protocol to the International Covenant on Economic, Social and Cultural Rights | United Nations | 2008 | - | - |
| Optional Protocol to the Convention on the Rights of the Child on a Communications Procedure | United Nations | 2011 | - | - |

== See also ==
- Freedom of religion in Comoros
- LGBT rights in Comoros
- Politics of Comoros

== Notes ==
1.Note that the "Year" signifies the "Year covered". Therefore the information for the year marked 2008 is from the report published in 2009, and so on.
2.As of 6 July (Independence Day) in 1975; 1 January thereafter.
3.The 1982 report covers the year 1981 and the first half of 1982, and the following 1984 report covers the second half of 1982 and the whole of 1983. In the interest of simplicity, these two aberrant "year and a half" reports have been split into three year-long reports through interpolation.
