= Agriculture in the Comoros =

Economic sector in the Comoros

Agriculture in the Comoros is an industry in the country of the Comoros.

== Production ==
In 2018, Comoros produced:

- 106 thousand tons of coconut;
- 66 thousand tons of cassava;
- 46 thousand tons of banana;
- 31 thousand tons of rice;
- 10 thousand tons of taro;
- 7.8 thousand tons of sweet potato;
- 7 thousand tons of maize;

In addition to smaller productions of other agricultural products.

== Exports ==
In 2022, main exports were:

- Clove - 71% of total exports;
- Ylang-Ylang and other perfume essences - 9% of total exports;
- Vanilla - 4% of total exports;

Comoros' main trading partners in 2022 were:

- Singapore - 35% of total exports;
- Turkey - 23%;
- France - 10%;
- Netherlands - 8%;
- India - 4%

== See also ==
- Economy of the Comoros
