= .km =

Internet country code top-level domain for Comoros

- Introduced: 8 June 1998
- TLD type: Country code top-level domain
- Status: Active
- Registry: Comores Telecom, registry operated by VeriSign
- Sponsor: Comores Telecom
- Intended use: Entities connected with Comoros
- Actual use: Not much used
- Structure: Registrations are made at second level
- Documents: Terms and conditions (French; MS Word document; archived October 2021)
- Dispute policies: UDRP
- Registry website: www.domaine.km

.km is the Internet country code top-level domain (ccTLD) for Comoros.

Registration is available directly at second-level or under a number of sub-domains (cost of KMF30000 in most categories):

- .km – Companies and trademarks registered at second-level.
- .com.km – Companies (unrestricted use).
- .coop.km – Co-operatives.
- .asso.km – Associations.
- .nom.km – Individuals («nom» means "name").
- .presse.km – Press organisations.
- .tm.km – Trademark owners.
- .medecin.km – Medical doctors.
- .notaires.km – Notaries.
- .pharmaciens.km – Pharmacists.
- .veterinaire.km – Veterinarians.
- .edu.km – Universities and professional institutes.
- .gouv.km – Government.
- .mil.km – Registered at no charge, for the military.

Second-level registrations are subject to restrictions and local presence requirements.

Third-level registrations are unrestricted in *.com.km if the name is not already registered elsewhere in .km; various category-specific restrictions apply to each of the other third-level domains. Personal name *.nom.km registrations are limited to island residents and to citizens resident abroad; various categories corresponding to the individual professions each require the applicant hold a license to practise that profession.
