= Christianity in the Comoros =

Christianity in the Comoros is a minority religion. In 2017, Roman Catholics in the Comoros number about 4,300 persons (0.5% of the population); Protestants number about 1,678 (0.25% of the population). Figures in 2020 show that this has gone down to 0.3% Catholic and 0.15% Protestant.

The constitution guarantees religious liberty but Christians are not allowed to proselytize publicly, and are subject to societal discrimination in some sectors. However, there are no restrictions towards Christians practicing their faith or attending church. There are foreign religious groups that take part in humanitarian action in the Comoros. They do not engage in proselytizing there, however. Religious groups do not have a duty to register.

A law states that whoever preaches another religion to any of the country's Muslims will be subject to both a prison sentence and a fine. On the island of Ngazidja, Christian liberty is greater than in other parts of the Comoros. There is a Roman Catholic church in Moroni on the island. Another Roman Catholic church is in Mutsamudu. There is also a Protestant church in Moroni.

According to the World Christian Encyclopedia, in the early 1970s there were three Catholic congregations, one congregation of Seventh-day Adventists, and two of the Eglise de Jésus Christ aux Comores.

== See also ==
- Religion in Comoros
- Roman Catholicism in Comoros
- Protestantism by country
