= Transport in the Comoros =

There are a number of systems of transport in the Comoros. The Comoros possesses 880 km (547 mi) of road, of which 673 km (418 mi) are paved. It has three seaports: Fomboni, Moroni and Moutsamoudou, but does not have a merchant marine, and no longer has any railway network. It has four airports, all with paved runways, one with runways over 2,438 m (7,999 ft) long, with the others having runways shorter than 1,523 m (4,997 ft).

The isolation of the Comoros had made air traffic a major means of transportation. One of President Abdallah's accomplishments was to make the Comoros more accessible by air. During his administration, he negotiated agreements to initiate or enhance commercial air links with Tanzania and Madagascar. The Djohar regime reached an agreement in 1990 to link Moroni and Brussels by air. By the early 1990s, commercial flights connected the Comoros with France, Mauritius, Kenya, South Africa, Tanzania, and Madagascar. The national airline was Air Comores. Daily flights linked the three main islands, and air service was also available to Mahoré; each island had airstrips. In 1986 the republic received a grant from the French government's CCCE to renovate and expand Hahaya airport, near Moroni. Because of the absence of scheduled sea transport between the islands, nearly all interisland passenger traffic is by air.

More than 99% of freight is transported by sea. Both Moroni on Njazidja and Mutsamudu on Nzwani have artificial harbors. There is also a harbor at Fomboni, on Mwali. Despite extensive internationally financed programs to upgrade the harbors at Moroni and Mutsamudu, by the early 1990s only Mutsamudu was operational as a deepwater facility. Its harbor could accommodate vessels of up to eleven meters' draught. At Moroni, ocean-going vessels typically lie offshore and are loaded or unloaded by smaller craft, a costly and sometimes dangerous procedure. Most freight continues to be sent to Tanzania, Kenya, Reunion, or Madagascar for transshipment to the Comoros. Use of Comoran ports is further restricted by the threat of cyclones from December through March. The privately operated Comoran Navigation Company (Société Comorienne de Navigation) is based in Moroni, and provides services to Madagascar.

Roads serve the coastal areas, rather than the interior, and the mountainous terrain makes surface travel difficult.

== See also ==
- History of rail transport in the Comoros
