= Islam in the Comoros =

Islam is the largest religion in the Comoros. According to the 2025 estimate by the CIA World Factbook, roughly 98% of the population in the Comoros is Muslim. A strong majority of Muslims in the Comoros are Sunni belonging to Shafi'i school of jurisprudence.

== History ==
=== Introduction of Islam ===
Local legend claims Islam was brought to the islands during Muhammad’s lifetime, brought by two Comorian nobles, Fey Bedja Mwamba and Mtswa Mwandze, who visited Mecca. However, the earliest known evidence of human occupation of the Comoro Islands dates to the 8th century CE.

Muslim merchants likely had a presence in the area as far back as the 9th or 10th century, due to the Comoros being actively involved in the Indian Ocean trade. A small proportion of native Comorians may have converted to Islam during that time, especially among the local elite. Large-scale conversion of the islanders in this era is improbable, in part because the local elite needed slaves for labor and trade, and Islam prohibits the enslavement of fellow Muslims.

Later arrivals by Persian traders from Shiraz introduced the religion in a more substantive manner. They began traveling to Africa in the 10th and 11th centuries CE, and waves of Shirazi migration to the Comoros continued through the fifteenth and sixteenth centuries CE. They were likely part of a migration of people already settled in that region, whom utilized a Arabized Islamic identity to bolster their prestige, which also led to marriages with native elite families. They likely were Shia Muslims.

The Shirazi influx was coupled with increasing Hadrami immigration, and it is this latter group who appears to have had the biggest religious influence, as they were Sunni and followed the Shafi'i school, which remains the dominant form of Islam in the Comoros. They built mosques and undertook large-scale conversion of all non-enslaved Comorians to Islam.

=== Later developments ===
As Islam became the established religion of the islands, ruling families stressed their Arab and Islamic identities to maintain or expand their prestige and political legitimacy. They learned Arabic, performed Hajj, and adopted the title of "Sultan" in the style of Egyptian and Ottoman rulers. They also maintained ties with other Muslim communities, such as Hadramawt, Kilwa, and Zanzibar. These ties, part of the Indian Ocean trade networks, were not only economic, but also religious and cultural.

Several Sufi religious orders (tariqa) are active in the Comoros, including the Ba 'Alawiyya, the Qadiriyya, and the Shadhili. In the 19th century, Sheikh Abdallah Darwesh initiated the Shadiliya tariqa in the Comoros. He traveled throughout the Middle East and later converted Sayyid Muḥammad b. Shaykh Aḥmad al-Maʿarūf, who became the Shadilya’s supreme guide. Al-Habib Omar b. Ahmed Bin Sumeit (d. 1976) studied in Arab countries before serving as teacher and qadi in Madagascar, Zanzibar, and, after 1967, the Comoros.

Although the Comoros were taken over by France during the Scramble for Africa, they left Islam's role in the islands' religious and cultural practices alone. They also respected the precedents of sharia as interpreted by the Shafi'i jurists.

=== Islam in the independent Comoros ===
After independence, Ali Soilih was made head of state. He held power from 1976 to 1978, but sought to establish a secular state, despite considering himself a devout Muslim. The government was never stable, due in part to Soilih's attempts at social/religious reform, as well as food shortages and economic crises. Though a constitution was approved via a referendum in 1977, a coup in May 1978 unseated and eventually killed Soilih.

After the 1978 coup, Ahmed Abdallah (who had preceded Soilih as President) took power. The new government rewrote the constitution, naming Islam as the state religion, and basing the government on Islamic law. The country's official name also changed to the Federal Islamic Republic of the Comoros, reflecting this resurgence of an explicitly Islamic state. (Note: In 2002, the country's name was changed to the Union of the Comoros) Abdallah personally led Friday prayers and life in the country became increasingly Islamic.

Further Islamization of the state was undertaken after Mohamed Taki Abdoulkarim's election as President in 1996, including a ban on alcohol and encouraging religious leaders' participation in politics. In the mid-1990s, 86% of the population was Muslim, with 14% Roman Catholic. The Central Intelligence Agency's World Factbook currently estimates that the population is 98.1% Muslim. This is in part due to the country's religious discrimination, perhaps the harshest of any Muslim-majority country in Sub-Saharan Africa. There are three churches in the country, but they are only open to non-citizens. Christian literature and non-Islamic religious symbols are banned. Christians can also be arrested for "anti-Islamic activity".

In the past decade, anti-Shia discrimination has also risen. In 2008, the national assembly passed a law making Sunni Islam the official faith of the Comoros, though then-president Ahmed Abdallah Sambi never implemented it. His successor, Ikililou Dhoinine, did implement it, leading to the arrest of a Comorian Shi'ite leader and part of his congregation. The Comorian Constitutional Court eventually ruled that private practice of any religion is legal, though in 2016, president Azali Assoumani issued a new ban on Shia practices even in private. A 2018 constitutional amendment pushed by Azali established Sunni Islam as the country's official religion, possibly motivated by internal and external political conflicts: a rival politician was Shia, and it also may have tied to the Iran–Saudi Arabia proxy war.

== Mosques and schools ==
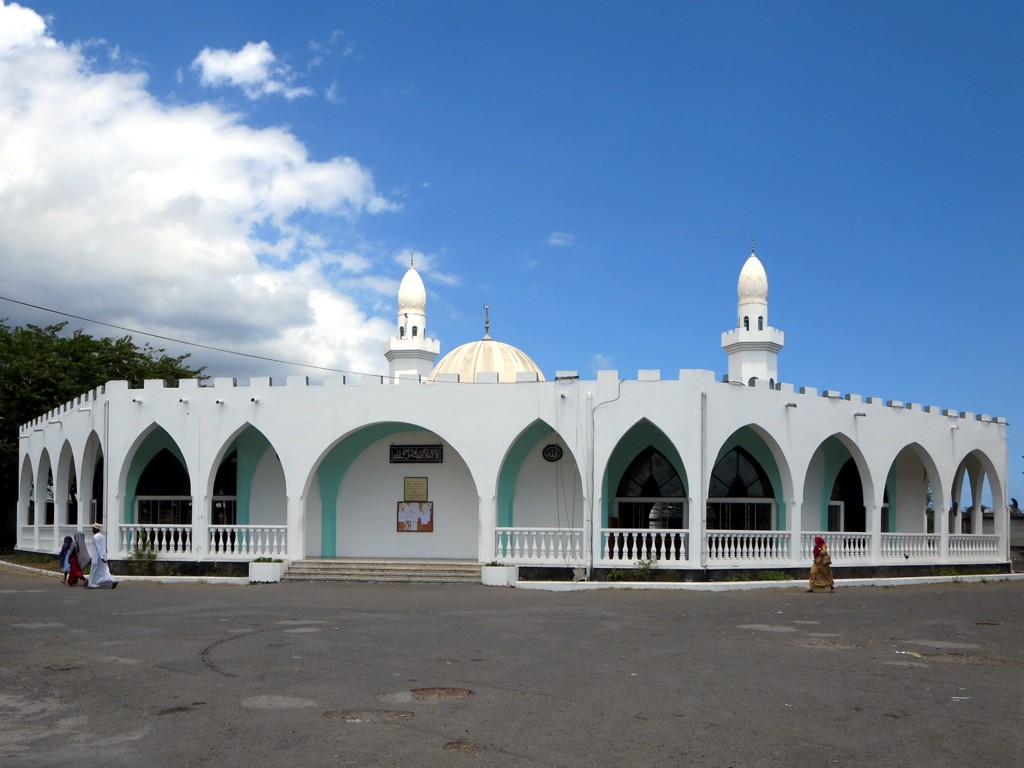
A mosque in the Comoros

Mosques appeared slowly in the islands; since Islam was originally only the religion of the elite traders, there was no need for a dedicated religious meeting place. The earliest signs of a mosque in the Comoros date to the late ninth century CE, and the Shirazi mosques were built a few centuries later. Large-scale mosque construction would occur with the arrival of the Hadrami, such as a 1538 CE mosque built by the Hadrami sultan of Mayotte.

Hundreds of mosques are scattered throughout the islands, as well as numerous madrasa. In the 1990s, a new Grand Mosque, financed by the emir of Sharjah, was inaugurated in Moroni. Practically all children learn the rudiments of Islam in their local schools. Madrasas and maʿāhid (secondary schools) provide further education about Islam and the Arabic language.

== Holidays and festivals ==
Comorians are overwhelmingly Sunni Muslims, and observe religious holidays and events with religious orthodoxy. Muslim holidays are observed, with special emphasis on Laylat al-Mi'raj, the commemoration of the Prophet's ascension into Heaven, and Mawlid, the Prophet's birthday. Mawlid is marked by celebrations culminating in a feast prepared for the ulama. Many women wear the chirumani, a printed cloth worn around the body. Comorians often consult mwalimus or fundi and marabouts for healing and protection from jinn. Mwalimus activate jinn to determine propitious days for feasts, have a successful marriage, conduct healing ceremonies, and prepare amulets containing Quranic ayat.

== Political Islam ==
The political climate of the Comoros has been unstable since independence, and rival factions have sought to mobilize religious support both to uphold and contest political power and social inequality. These conflicts include sectarianism (Sunni vs. Shia) and secularism (Islamic vs. secular views), and also interact with international conflicts (most notably, the Arab League and the Iran–Saudi Arabia proxy war). Some specific cases include the coup against secularist president Ali Soilih in 1978, a constitutional referendum in 2018 naming Sunni Islam the official faith of the islands while the president's main rival was Shi'ite, and Comorian closures of Iranian and Qatari diplomatic relations in 2016 and 2017 as Saudi funding to the islands increased.

Wahhabism has become increasingly as students returned from Islamic studies abroad, and as Wahhabi ulama have arrived in the country to teach to the younger generations. Suspected al-Qaeda member Fazul Abdullah Mohammed was born in Moroni in the Comoros.

== See also ==
- Islam by country
- List of non-Arab Sahaba
- Religion in the Comoros
